= List of vegetarian and vegan companies =

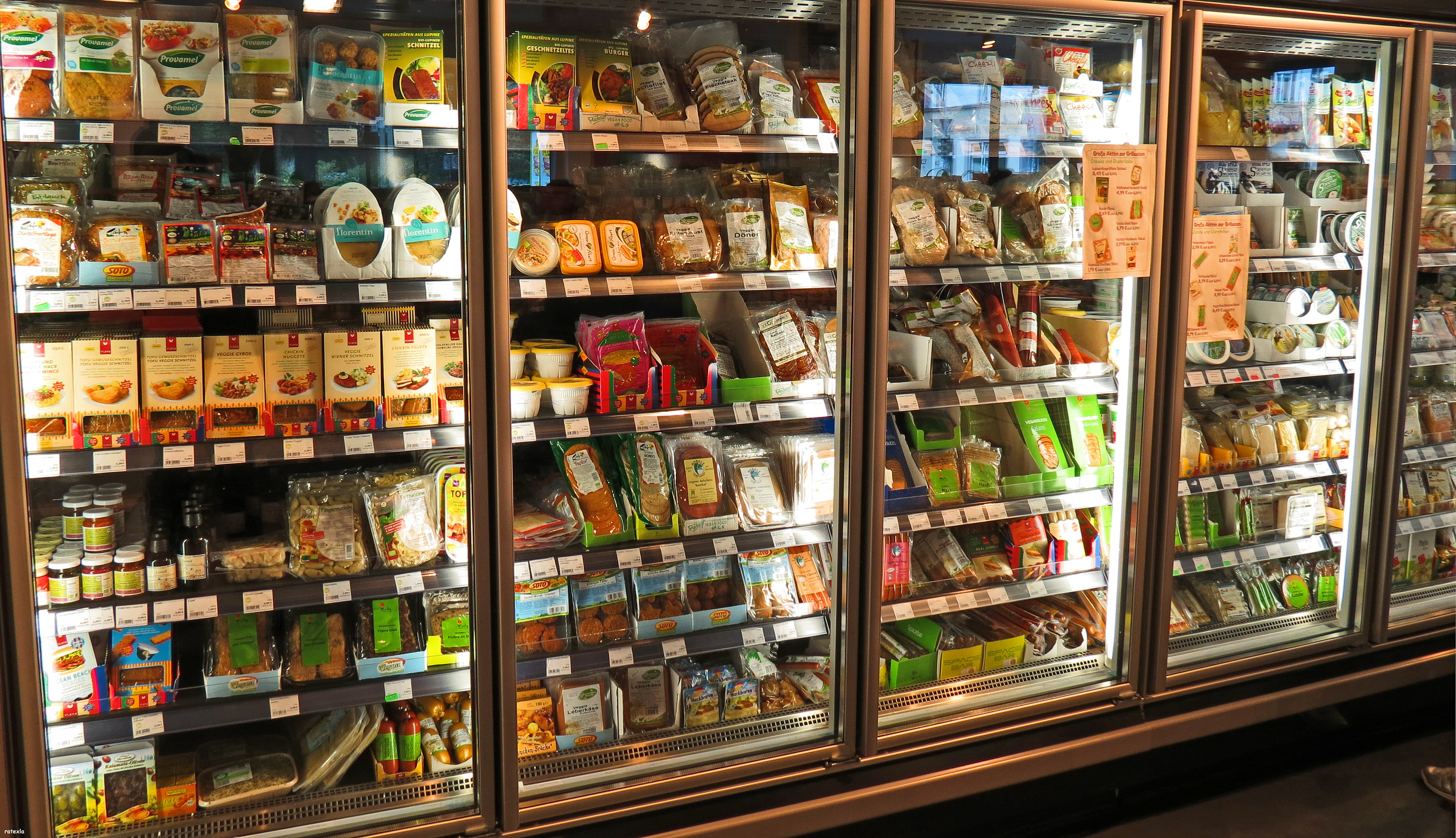
Meat alternative products at a Veganz store in Berlin, Germany

This is a list of vegetarian and vegan companies that do not use animal products or animal-based products in their goods. Such companies include food manufacturers and cosmetics companies, among others.

== Vegetarian and vegan companies ==
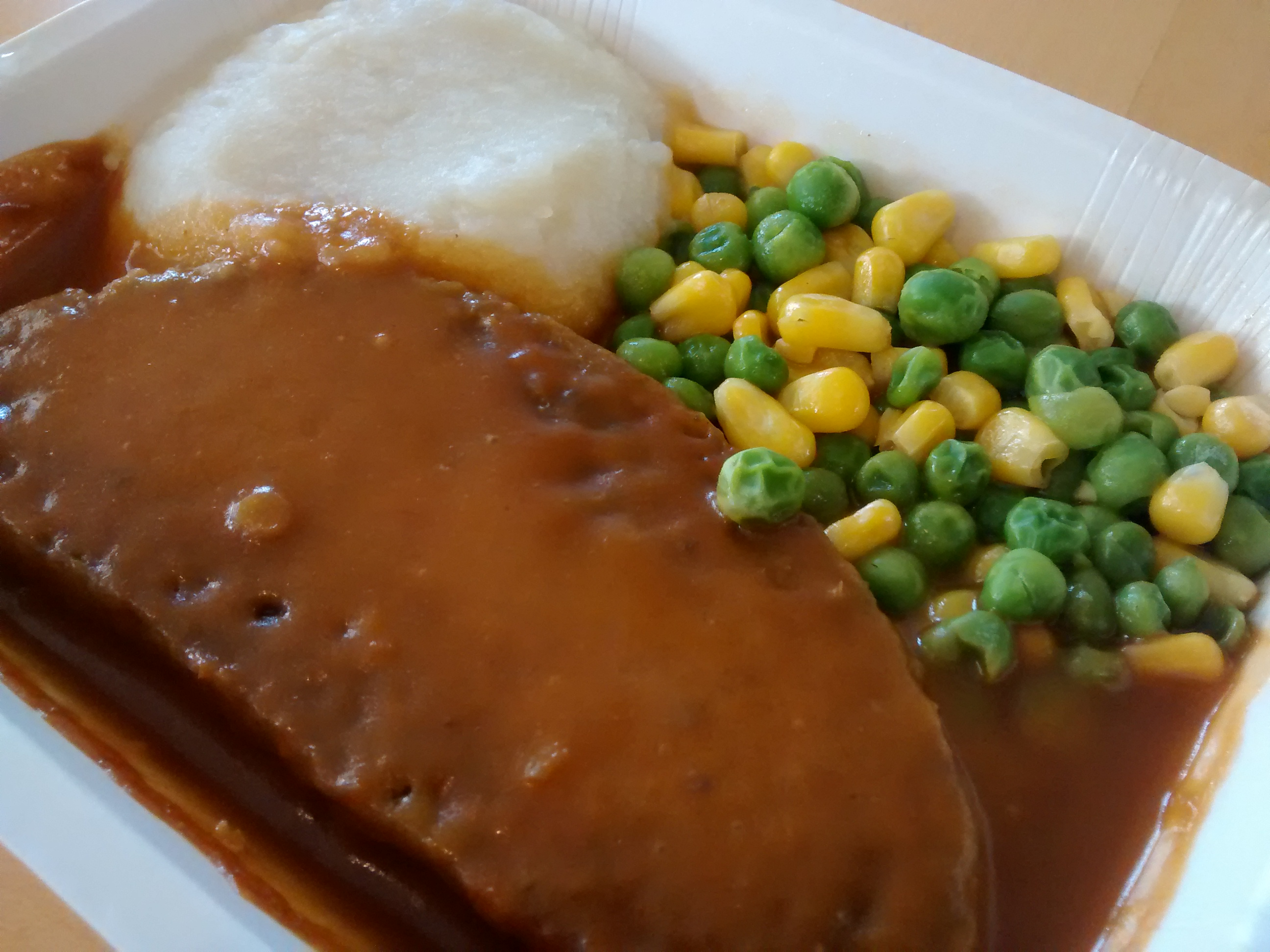
An Amy's Kitchen veggie loaf with mashed potatoes and vegetables

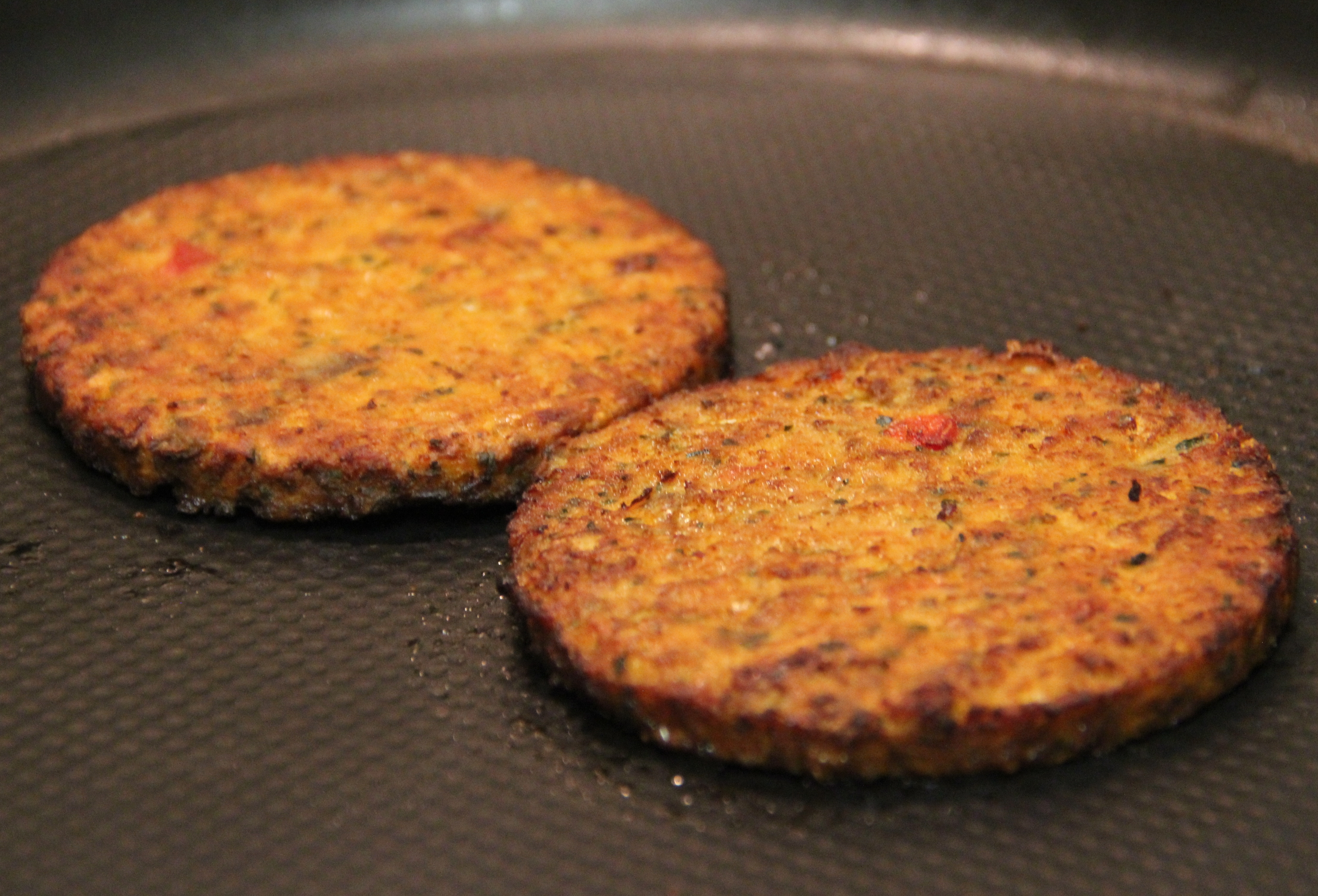
Two Morningstar Farms veggie burgers being cooked

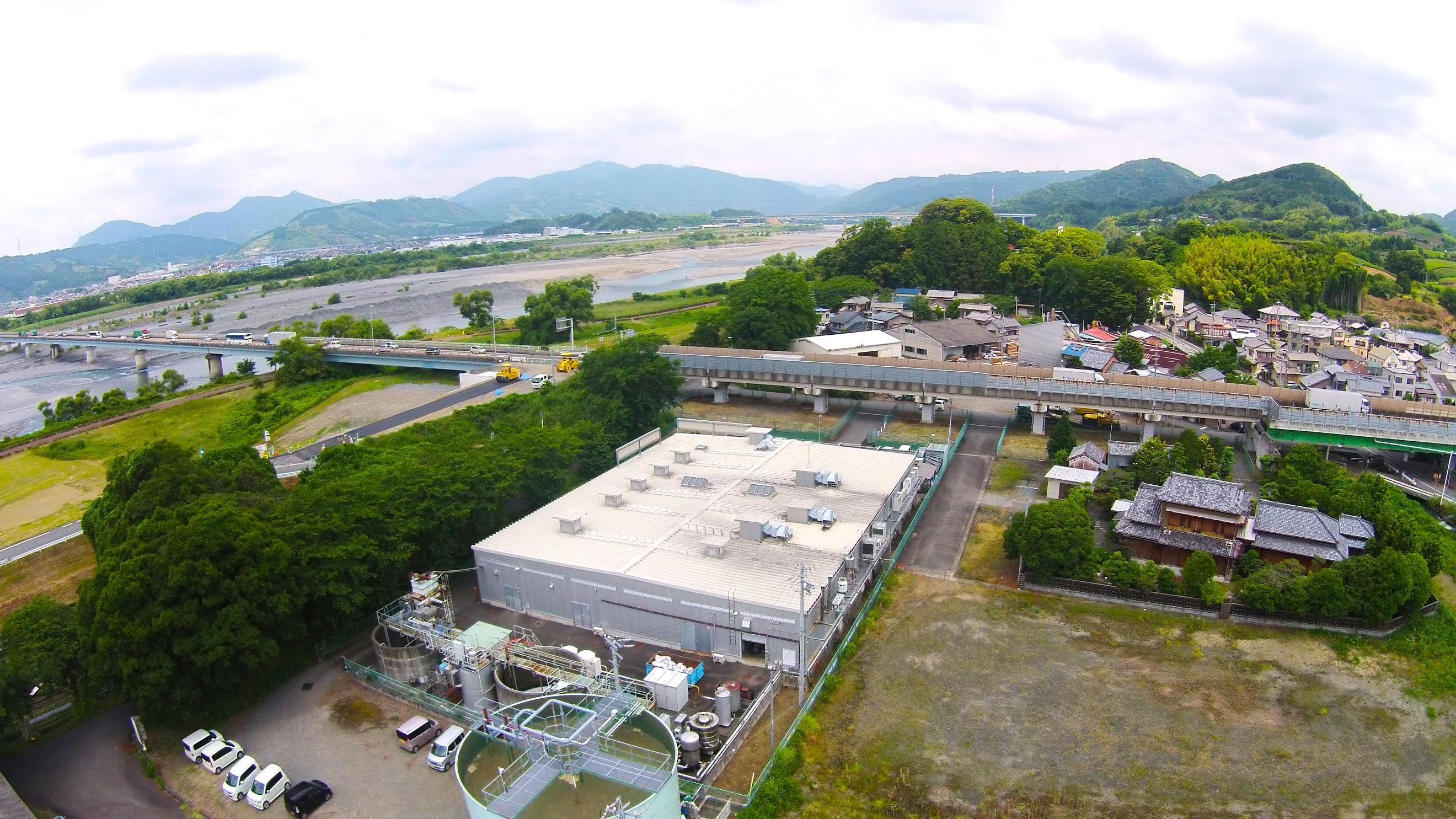
A Somenoya factory in Shizuoka, Japan

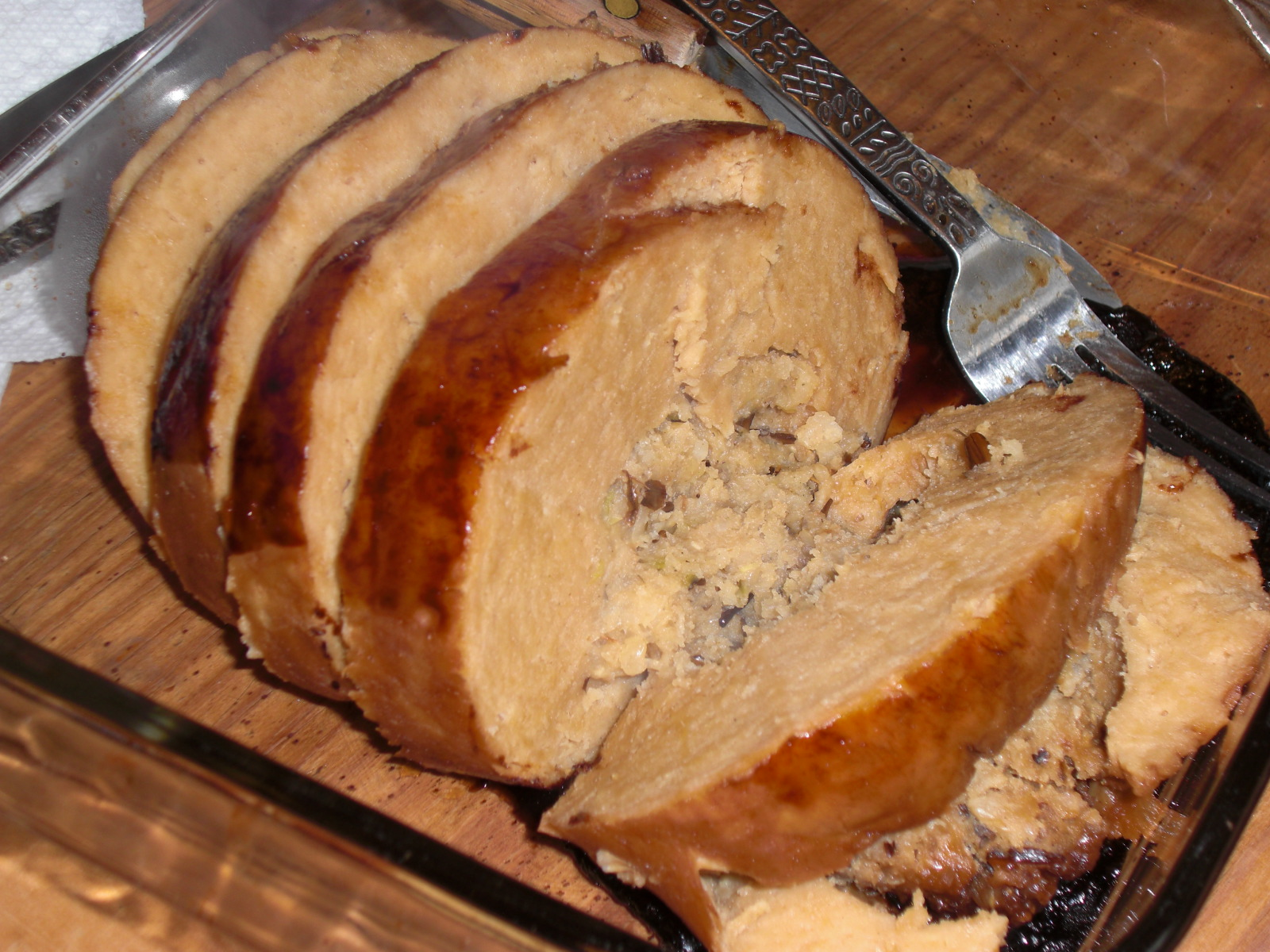
Tofurky is produced by Turtle Island Foods

=== General ===
- Adyar Anandha Bhavan – restaurant company offering snacks and sweets
- Amy's Kitchen – family-owned, privately held company in Petaluma, California, that manufactures vegetarian organic food and non-GMO convenience and frozen foods.
- Bikanervala – vegetarian Indian sweets and snacks manufacturer based in Delhi, India.
- The EVERY Company – produces several vegan alternatives, most notably bioidentical egg whites through a fermentation process.
- Eat JUST, Inc. – founded in 2011 as Hampton Creek Foods, Inc. Several products, including non-GMO, egg-free, gluten-free, Kosher spread and dressing. Just Mayo launched in 2013.
- Follow Your Heart – makers of Vegenaise and other vegan and vegetarian food products.
- Food For Life Global – a non-profit vegan food relief organization founded in 1995 to serve as the headquarters for Food for Life projects. Food For Life engages in various sorts of hunger relief, including outreach to the homeless, provision for disadvantaged children throughout India, and provision for victims of natural disasters around the world.
- Goshen Alimentos – Brazilian vegetarian and vegan food manufacturer.
- Happy Family – manufacturer of vegetarian, organic Happy Baby foods.
- Nature's Fynd – produces vegan foods, meatless and dairy-free, using nutritional fungi protein.

=== Dairy, milk substitutes and drinks ===
- Alpro – European company based in Belgium that markets organic and non-organic, non-genetically modified, soy based food and drink products. Alpro became a division of Danone with its 2016 acquisition of WhiteWave Foods.
- Amul – India's biggest dairy co-operative and world's biggest vegetarian cheese brand.
- Brave Robot – vegan ice cream company using Perfect Day synthesized milk protein.
- Celestial Seasonings teas – a division of Hain Celestial Group.
- Daiya – Canadian dairy alternative food company located in Vancouver, British Columbia.
- Earth's Own Food Company – Canadian health food manufacturing company that manufactures the So Good soy beverage in Canada owned by the Seventh-day Adventist Church.
- Eden Foods Inc. – organic food company in the United States that produces the Edensoy line of organic soy milk.
- Innocent Drinks – produces and purveys smoothies and juice products.
- La Fauxmagerie – British vegan cheese shop.
- Oatly – oat-based dairy substitutes founded in Sweden.
- Silk – American manufacturer of dairy substitutes. Initially a manufacturer of soy milk, but has since expanded to other dairy substitutes such as almond milk, cashew milk, coconut milk, and oat milk.
- Tofutti – American vegan cheese and ice cream company.

=== Meat substitutes ===
- Beyond Meat – producers of mass-market pea protein-based products designed to replace animal protein. (El Segundo, California)
- Boca Burgers – a soy protein and wheat gluten veggie burger manufactured by Boca Foods, a subsidiary of Kraft Foods.
- Fry Group Foods – family-owned manufacturer of vegan meat substitutes founded by South Africans Wally and Debbie Fry in 1991.
- Gardein – meat-free foods developed by Canadian Yves Potvin (formerly of Yves Deli Cuisine) as Garden Protein International, manufactured from soy, wheat, grains and vegetables, including pea protein. Acquired by Pinnacle Foods in 2014.
- Impossible Foods – plant-based meat substitutes fermenting genetically-engineered heme from plants.
- LightLife – produces vegetarian and vegan meat substitutes.
- Prime Roots – American koji-based meat-substitute-producing company headquartered in California.
- Quorn – British meat substitute company headquartered in Stokesley, North Yorkshire and owned by Monde Nissin Corporation.
- Simulate – American company that produces plant-based chicken nuggets.
- Turtle Island Foods – produces Tofurky, a vegetarian and vegan alternative to turkey, as well other meatless products.
- Upside Foods – produces meat substitutes, located in the Bay Area, California

=== Others and unsorted ===
- JUST, Inc. – founded in 2011 as Hampton Creek Foods, Inc. Several products, including non-GMO, egg-free, gluten-free, Kosher spread and dressing. Just Mayo launched in 2013.
- La Loma Foods – formerly Loma Linda Foods. Food manufacturer of "Loma Linda" brand vegetarian and vegan foods. Acquired in 1991 by Morningstar Farms originator, Ohio's Worthington Foods, which was then acquired, in 1999, by Kellogg's and then, in 2015, by the Atlantic Natural Foods Company (Meatless Select, Caroline's brands), of Nashville, North Carolina.
- Linda McCartney Foods – British food brand specializing in vegetarian and vegan food.
- Make My Day Foods Inc – manufacturer of the Veggie Puck, founded in 2016 in Toronto, Canada.
- MeliBio – manufacturer of Mellody vegan honey from Oakland, California.
- Miyoko's Creamery – creates non-dairy products; established in 2014 by Miyoko Schinner.
- Morning Star Farms – Worthington Foods of Ohio developed vegetarian, soy-based meat alternative food products. In 1999, Worthington Foods was acquired by Kellogg's and then, in 2015, by the Atlantic Natural Foods Company, without the Morning Star brand. In the 21st century, Morning Star manufactures a variety of vegetarian foods.
- Nayonaise – founded in Leominster, Massachusetts, in 1977 as Nasoya Foods, Inc., acquired by Vitasoy in 1990, which was then acquired by Pulmuone Co., Ltd. in 2016.
- Perfect Day – American manufacturer of whey and casein produced for dairy via fermentation in bioreactors.
- Plamil Foods – British manufacturer of vegan food products.
- Ripple Foods – California producer of non-gmo, gluten-free, soy-free, non-dairy, pea protein-based Ripple dairy alternatives, made without carrageenans.
- Sabra – U.S.-based Israeli company which produces dips such as hummus, guacamole and other food products. All Sabra products are certified kosher and vegetarian.
- Sahmyook Foods – South Korean food company producing a large range of soy milks and vegetarian products, which is owned by the Seventh-day Adventist Church.
- Sanitarium Health and Wellbeing Company – Trading name of two sister food companies (Australian Health and Nutrition Association Ltd and New Zealand Health Association Ltd). wholly owned by the Seventh-day Adventist Church.
- So Good – manufacturer of soy beverages, foods, and desserts.
- Somenoya – manufacturer of tofu and eco-friendly soy-based foods located in Chuo Ward, Tokyo.
- Sweet Earth Foods – manufacturer of vegan, ready-made meals based in Moss Landing, California. Acquired by Nestlé in 2017.
- Veganz – world's first vegan supermarket chain, headquartered in Berlin, Germany.
- Violife – vegan cheese Thessalonica, Greece.
- WhiteWave Foods – plant-based foods and beverages, and organic produce distributed throughout North America and Europe. WhiteWave was purchased by Danone on 7 July 2016, and was rebranded as DanoneWave, then subsequently rebranded as Danone North America, in 2018.

=== Cosmetics and skin care ===
- Beauty Without Cruelty – British company that manufactures vegan cosmetics, which contain no animal products, and are not tested on animals.
- Lush – cosmetics company that produces creams, soaps, shampoos, shower gels, lotions, moisturizers, scrubs, masks and other cosmetics using only vegetarian or vegan recipes.
- Tropic Skincare – British natural skincare and cosmetics company.

== See also ==
- Cultured meat
- Health food store
- History of vegetarianism
- International Vegetarian Week
- List of meat substitutes
- List of vegan and vegetarian restaurants
- List of vegan media
- List of vegetarian and vegan festivals
- List of vegetarian and vegan organizations
- List of vegetarian and vegan restaurants
- List of vegetarians
- Vegetarian cuisine
