= Coolhaus =

American ice cream company

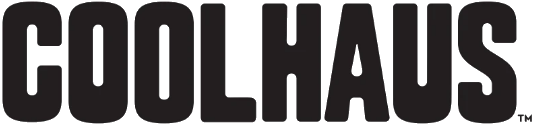
- Company type: Private
- Industry: Dairy
- Founded: 2009; 17 years ago
- Founders: Natasha Case and Freya Estreller
- Headquarters: Los Angeles, California, US
- Products: Ice cream sandwiches Ice cream bars Ice cream floats Candy bars Beverages
- Website: cool.haus

Coolhaus is an American ice cream company based in Los Angeles, California, founded in 2009 by Natasha Case and Freya Estreller.

== History ==
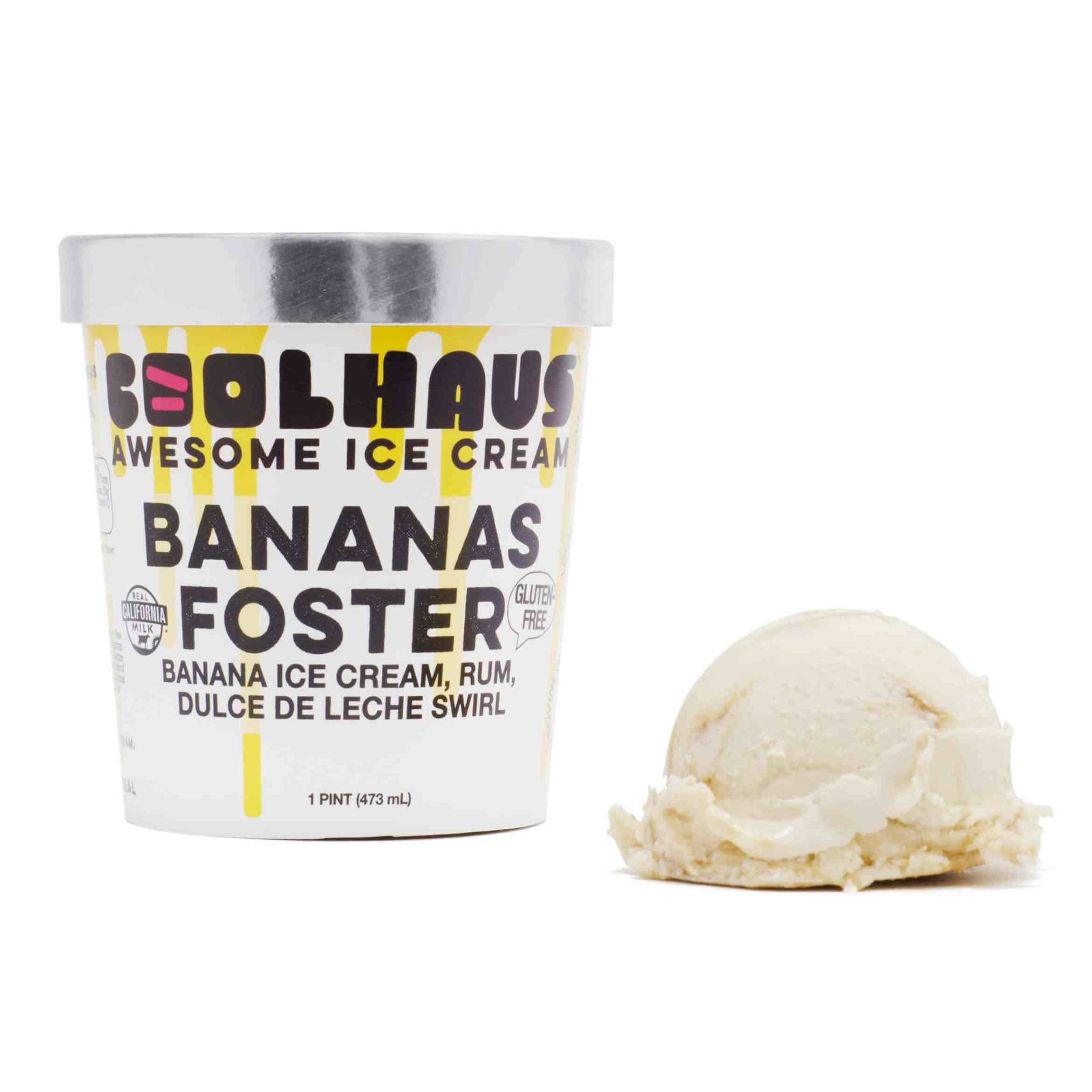
Bananas Foster pint, named after British architect Norman Foster, composed of banana ice cream and dulce de leche

Coolhaus started as an art project in 2008 and grew into a business by 2009. The name Coolhaus is a reference to architect Rem Koolhaas. Some Coolhaus flavors have names derived from architects and architectural movements. The co-founders started the company by selling ice cream sandwiches out of a food truck at the Coachella Valley Music and Arts Festival. Demand increased following media inquiries and social media exposure, and Case left her job at Disney to commit full-time to Coolhaus. Coolhaus added trucks in Austin, Texas, in 2010 and New York City in 2011, and opened its first storefront in Culver City, California, in 2011. By 2012, Coolhaus expanded to Miami, Florida. At the time, it had a total of ten trucks and one food cart. Fast Company described Coolhaus as "the first gourmet branded truck with a national reach".

Since 2011, Coolhaus has expanded into retail. In an interview with Entrepreneur, Case explained that retail distribution allows Coolhaus to reach as many consumers as possible. Between the spring of 2011 to the fall of 2014, Coolhaus went from 3 Whole Foods retail partner stores to 2,500. According to Case, the combination of food trucks, retail partnerships, and dedicated storefronts was essential for Coolhaus to achieve its reach. Forbes magazine named Case to its "30 Under 30" for the category "Food & Wine" in 2012.

In 2021, Coolhaus was acquired by The Urgent Company, a subsidiary of food technology start-up Perfect Day. This coincided with Coolhaus adopting Perfect Day's animal-free whey protein in all of their products. In 2023, The Urgent Company, including Coolhaus, was sold to US food tech firm Superlatus, which subsequently was acquired by TRxADE Health Inc.

== Reception ==
Coolhaus placed second out of eight in the rating company Zagat's 2012 feature of New York's best food trucks, as ranked by Zagat editors. InStyle called Coolhaus the "ice cream brand for every craving imaginable". ABC's morning television show Good Morning America posted Coolhaus recipes on its website.

== Distribution ==
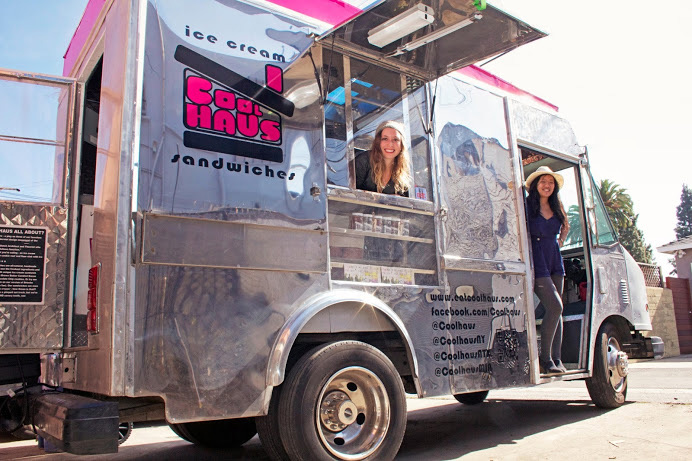
Co-founders Natasha Case and Freya Estreller in a Coolhaus ice cream truck

As of April 2014, Coolhaus runs two Los Angeles County storefronts in Old Town Pasadena and Culver City Arts District, and operated ice cream trucks and carts in Southern California, New York City, and Dallas. Prepackaged Coolhaus ice cream sandwiches, ice cream pints, and ice cream bars were sold in retail outlets such as Whole Foods, Gelson's Markets, Sprouts Farmers Market, Earth Fare, Fairway Market, Safeway, Publix and Wegman's. Coolhaus was also sold online.

In 2017, Coolhaus distributed its items in grocery stores and operated food trucks and ice cream shops.

In 2024, Coolhaus is mainly available at Whole Foods. Coolhaus also expanded their market into Hong Kong.

== Cookbook ==
Natasha Case, Freya Estreller, and food writer Kathleen Squires wrote a cookbook called Coolhaus Ice Cream Book. It was published by Houghton Mifflin Harcourt in May 2014. The book has recipes for ice creams, gelatos, sorbets, cookies, toppings, and shakes.

== See also ==
- List of frozen dessert brands
- Brave Robot
