= Daiya =

Canadian producer of vegan cheese substitutes

Daiya Foods Inc.
- Type: Subsidiary
- Industry: Retail, food service, ingredient supply
- Founded: 2008; 18 years ago
- Headquarters: 3100 Production Way, Burnaby, BC V5A 4R4
- Key people: Andre Kroecher (co-founder); Greg Blake (co-founder), Hajime Fujita (CEO)
- Products: Dairy alternatives
- Parent: Otsuka Pharmaceutical
- Website: www.daiyafoods.com

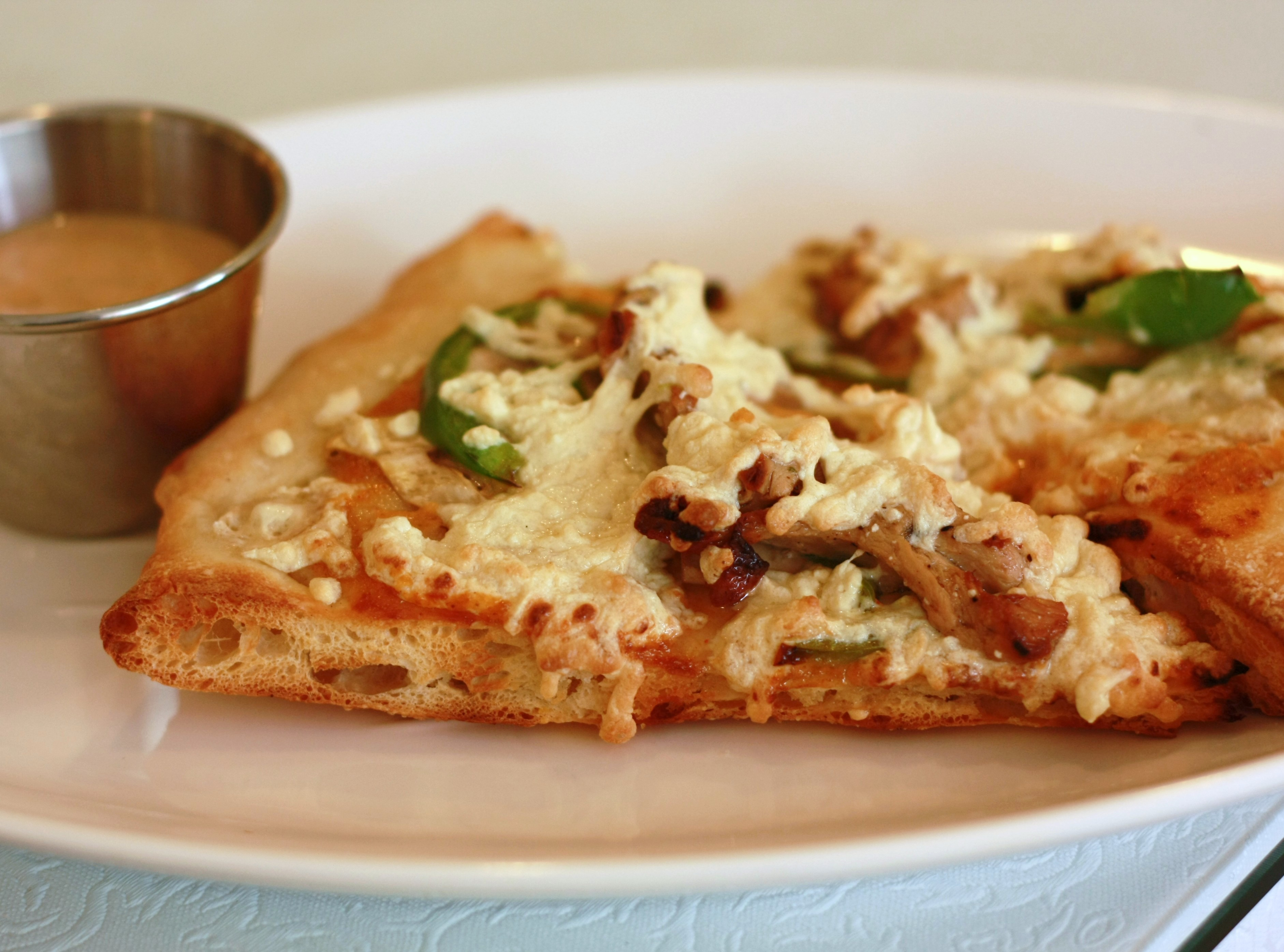
Pizza topped with Daiya cheese

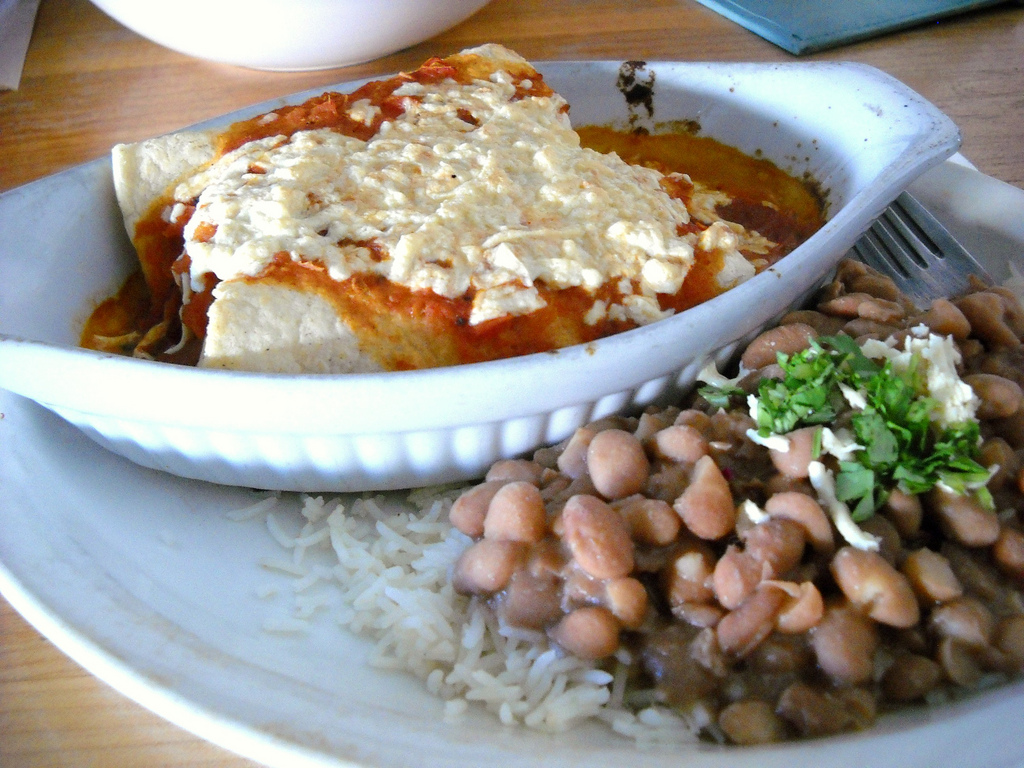
Vegan enchilada with Daiya cheese substitute

Daiya Foods Inc. is a Canada-based dairy-alternative food company located in Burnaby, British Columbia. The company was established in 2008 by Andre Kroecher and Greg Blake. Daiya's original products are cheese analogues made from coconut oil and tapioca flour that are known for their cheese-like consistency and melting properties. They contain no animal products or soy, lactose, wheat, barley, gluten, or nuts.

Daiya is sold in natural and conventional food stores in many countries including Canada, the US, the UK, Australia, Mexico, and Hong Kong. Its products are featured on restaurant menus and in packaged food products made by Amy's Kitchen and Turtle Island Foods. Daiya has won many awards for its products, including the 2009 Veggie Award for Product of the Year. In 2011, BC Business magazine named Daiya one of the 20 most innovative companies in British Columbia.

In July 2017, Otsuka Pharmaceutical agreed to acquire 100 percent of Daiya Foods for $405 million.

== History ==
Andre Kroecher first began developing Daiya in 2005. Greg Blake partnered with Kroecher in 2007 and the two spent the next year developing the mozzarella and cheddar style shreds based on Kroecher's early innovations. Food scientist Paul Wong was brought on in early 2008 to help with scaleup and refining the formulations. Daiya Foods, Inc's alternatives were first introduced at the Natural Products Expo West in Anaheim, California, in 2009 and were an instant success. In late 2009, Daiya Foods moved to a dedicated facility to ensure the highest level of food safety (Daiya Foods Inc. is an SQF certified facility) After Daiya's acquisition by Otsuka, some retailers discontinued carrying Daiya products due to Otsuka's practice of using animal testing.

In November 2019, Daiya Foods appointed Hajime Fujita as its new chief executive officer, a role in which he will oversee global operations and the brand's international expansion. Fujita joins Daiya from its parent company, Otsuka Pharmaceuticals. Additionally, Melanie Domer has been promoted to chief commercial officer, and John Kelly to chief marketing officer, marking significant leadership changes within the company.

== Products ==
As of 2026, Daiya offers a line of plant-based, dairy-free food products across several categories. Products includes various dairy-free cheeses (including shreds, slices, blocks, and sticks) along with a variety of cheese sauces, cream cheeses, cheesecakes, and cheesecake bites. The brand also produces other gluten-free and dairy-free prepared foods, including frozen pizzas and flatbreads featuring thin crusts and oat cream-based cheese, macaroni and cheese, and salad dressings.

== Awards ==
Daiya won first place in the BC Innovation Council (BCIC) 2009 Commercialization of Agricultural Technology Competition. Also in 2009, Daiya was the awarded the PETA Libby Award for best vegan cheese. Daiya Foods won the VegNews Veggie Award at the Natural Products ExpoWest Show in Anaheim, California, in March 2009, 2011 and 2012. In 2010, it won the best vegan cheese award from VegNews, and the 2010 Proggy Award for Company of the Year from PETA. 2012 awards in Canada include the British Columbia Food Processors award for Product of the Year and the Canadian Institute of Food Science and Technology Gordon Royal Maybee award, in recognition of outstanding applied development by a Canadian company or institution in the fields of food production, processing, transportation, storage or quality control.

== See also ==
- List of vegetarian and vegan companies
