= Bikanervala =

Indian food production company

- Industry: Food
- Founded: 1905; 121 years ago
- Founder: Kedarnath Aggarwal
- Headquarters: Delhi, India
- Brands: Bikanervala; Bikano; Bikano Chat Cafe
- Revenue: ₹1,300 crore (US$130 million) (2023)
- Website: www.bikanervala.com

Bikanervala is an Indian multinational snack food company and restaurant chain headquartered in Delhi that specializes in Indian sweets and snacks. The restaurant chain has 150 locations both in India and globally.

== History ==
In 1950 two brothers, Kedarnath and Satyanarayan Aggarwal, moved to Delhi from Bikaner to plan an expansion of their traditional business. Initially the brothers set up a stall in Chandni Chowk by the name of Bikaner Bhujia Bhandar (lit. 'Bikaneri bhujia store'), on Paranthe wali Gali.

=== Lawsuit ===
In 2012 the company was acquitted after being charged with selling adulterated products. It was alleged that the amount of synthetic dye used in the product exceeded the legal limit.

== Operations ==
Manufacturing is based in Delhi, Noida, Uttar Pradesh, and Faridabad and Rai in Haryana.

== See also ==
- List of vegetarian and vegan companies
