= Plant Based Foods Association =

American trade association

- Abbreviation: PBFA
- Formation: 2016
- Type: Trade association
- Services: Representation of the U.S. plant-based food industry
- Executive director: Marjorie Mulhall
- Website: www.plantbasedfoods.org

The Plant Based Foods Association (PBFA) is an American trade association representing companies in the plant-based food industry. Founded in 2016, the association works on public policy, food labeling, retail development and other issues affecting manufacturers of plant-based alternatives to meat, dairy and other animal-derived foods.

== History ==
The Plant Based Foods Association was established in 2016 by food policy lawyer and public health advocate Michele Simon. It launched with 23 member companies at a time when manufacturers of plant-based foods did not have a dedicated trade association representing the sector in U.S. food-policy debates.

The association initially focused on issues including food labeling, government food programs and the placement of plant-based products in retail stores. In 2017, Campbell's became the first major conventional food manufacturer to join the association; PBFA had grown to more than 80 members by that time.

Rachel Dreskin became chief executive officer of PBFA in 2021. In 2023, the association expanded its activities to include a consumer-marketing initiative intended to promote plant-based foods across multiple product categories, following an earlier emphasis on policy and retail development. Dreskin left the organization in 2025, and Marjorie Mulhall was appointed executive director in April 2026.

== Activities ==
=== Policy and food labeling ===
PBFA advocates on federal and state policies affecting plant-based food manufacturers, including regulations governing the terminology used for alternatives to meat and dairy products. In 2017, PBFA joined the Good Food Institute and the Soyfoods Association of North America in opposing the proposed federal Dairy Pride Act, which sought to restrict the use of dairy-related terms such as "milk" for plant-based products.

In 2020, PBFA and Chicago-based food manufacturer Upton's Naturals filed a federal lawsuit challenging an Oklahoma law that required qualifying terms identifying foods as plant-based to appear with similar prominence to meat-related terminology on product labels. The plaintiffs argued that the requirement violated their First Amendment rights. Turtle Island Foods, the producer of Tofurky, subsequently replaced Upton's Naturals as the manufacturer plaintiff. In 2024, the federal district court dismissed the case without prejudice after finding that the plaintiffs lacked standing.

=== Retail research ===
PBFA has conducted research with grocery retailers on the merchandising of plant-based products. From December 2019 to February 2020, it partnered with Kroger on a test involving 60 stores in Colorado, Indiana and Illinois. Refrigerated plant-based meat products were placed within conventional meat departments during the test. Sales of plant-based meat at the participating stores increased by an average of 23 percent compared with control stores.

=== Certified Plant Based ===
In 2018, PBFA introduced the '''Certified Plant Based''' certification and labeling program for plant-based foods. The program was initially developed for alternatives to meat, dairy and eggs and requires certified products to contain no animal-derived ingredients. NSF International serves as the independent certifier for the program in the United States and Canada.

== See also ==
- Plant-based diet
- Meat alternative
- Plant milk
- Veganism
- Good Food Institute
