= Tofurkey =

Meat substitute patterned after turkey

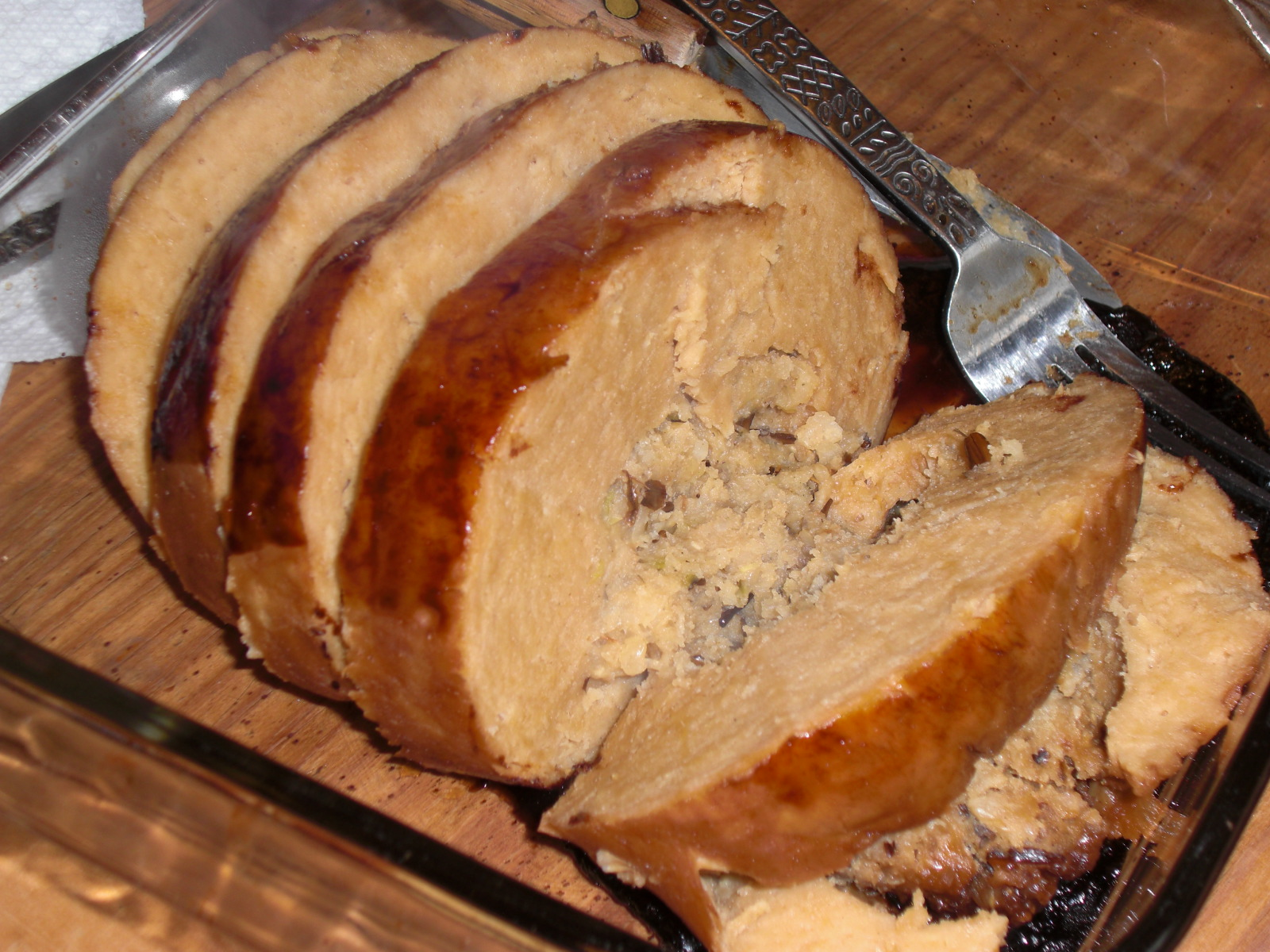
Tofurky brand tofurkey

Tofurkey (a portmanteau of tofu and turkey) is a plant-based meat substitute patterned after turkey, in the form of a loaf of vegetarian protein, usually made from tofu (soybean protein) or seitan (wheat protein) with a stuffing made from grains or bread, flavored with a broth and seasoned with herbs and spices. It is often served at a vegetarian or vegan Thanksgiving meal.

UnTurkey, produced until 2006 by the now-defunct Now & Zen Bakery in San Francisco, was one of the first ready-made tofurkey products available in the U.S.

Currently available products include those of the company Tofurky and the Celebration Roast produced by Field Roast. A variant of turducken made using tofurkey is known as tofucken.

== See also ==
- List of casserole dishes
- List of meat substitutes
- List of stuffed dishes
- Meat alternative
- Nut roast, an often homemade, nut-based, roasted main dish
- Quorn
- Stuffed peppers, a dish of stuffed vegetables
- Veggie burger
