= Somenoya =

Japanese food company

Somenoya (Someno's Tofu / Somenoya Hanjiro)
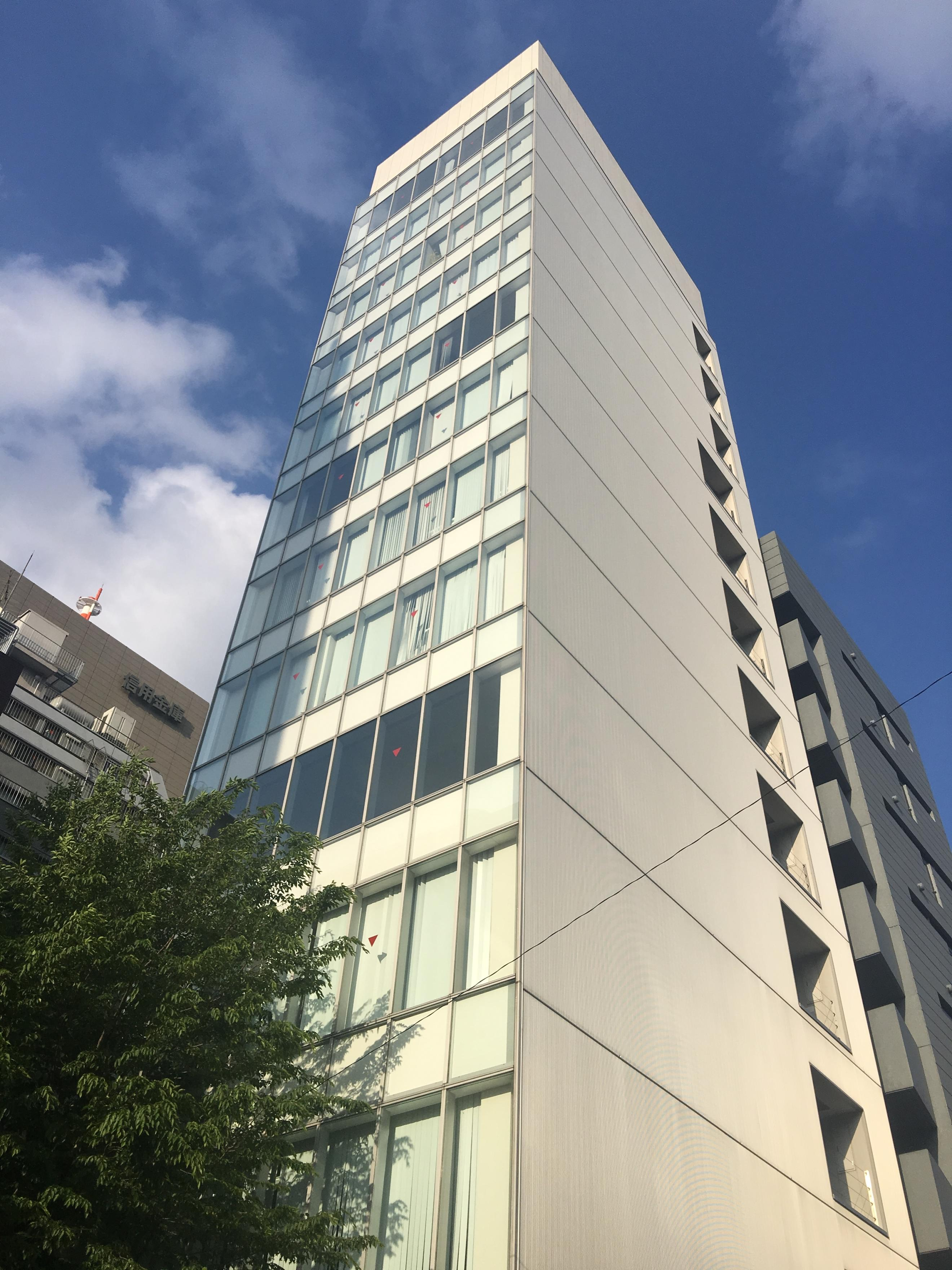
- Headquarters in Kyobashi, Tokyo, Japan
- Native name: 株式会社染野屋
- Romanized name: Kabushiki-gaisha Somenoya
- Type: Public (K.K.)
- Industry: food manufacturing
- Headquarters: Chiyoda, Tokyo, Japan
- Key people: Atsuto Ono Hanjiro VIII, (CEO and President)
- Products: Tofu, eco-friendly soy-based foods
- Number of employees: 200 (September 1, 2016)
- Website: www.somenoya.com/english2/index_english2.html

Someno's Tofu Co., Ltd. (株式会社染野屋, Kabushiki-gaisha Somenoya) is a Japanese company headquartered in Chiyoda Ward, Tokyo that manufactures tofu and soy-based foods. It has six retail outlets and operates a fleet of 130 sales trucks in the Kanto and Tokai regions of Japan.

Somenoya was founded in 1862 during Japan's Edo period. Somenoya applies traditional Edo principles, including the use of locally-grown soybeans and nigari and no additives. Most business is done by hikiuri, a traditional system of roaming sales. In the old days, hikiuri tofu peddlers walked around towns and villages carrying their wares in large wooden baskets. Modern vendors travel in small, refrigerated trucks.

== Environmentalism ==
Somenoya is an official sponsor of Meat Free Monday Japan, the Japanese sister campaign of the international movement spearheaded by Sir Paul McCartney. This is in line with efforts to promote a cultural shift from environmentally unsustainable, meat-based proteins to proteins derived from plants (principally soybeans).

The current CEO, Hanjiro VIII, won the first annual Japan Vegetarian Award Meat Free Monday Prize from the Japan Vegetarian Society (NPO) in February, 2016. He received the award for his ongoing "Soybeans Save the World" lecture series, which he created to spread consciousness on vegetarianism and environmental issues.

== Timeline History ==
1862: Hanjiro I begins making and selling tofu in Toride City, Ibaraki, Japan under the company name Yamahan Yorozuya.

1907: Hanjiro II changes the company name to Hanjiro.

1932: The company splits into two organizations, Hanjiro and Someno.

2004: Hanjiro VIII inherits the company and changes the name to Somenoya. The first Somenoya retail shop opens in the Boxhill department store adjacent to the train station in Toride City.

2005: The Hanjiro lines merge under the name Somenoya.

2006: A retail sales branch and distribution centre opens beside the Toride factory.

2007: The Chiba City retail sales branch and distribution centre opens in Chiba Prefecture.

2008: The Saitama City retail sales branch and distribution centre opens in Saitama Prefecture.

2009: The Toride factory earns ISO 9001 certification.

2011: Somenoya headquarters moves from Toride to Tokyo. The Adachi Ward retail sales branch and distribution centre opens in Tokyo.

2013: The Yokohama retail sales branch and distribution centre opens in Kanagawa Prefecture. A second factory opens in Shimada City, Shizuoka Prefecture. Yaizu City retail sales branch and distribution centre opens in Shizuoka Prefecture.

2015: CEO Atsuto Ono inherits the title of Hanjiro VIII.

2016: The Shizuoka factory receives HACCP certification.

2019: The Oyama retail sales branch and distribution centre opens in Tochigi Prefecture.

2021: Yamashita Mitsu Shoten Co., Ltd. in Ishikawa Prefecture becomes a member of Somenoya group.

The Ota retail sales branch and distribution centre opens in Gunma Prefecture.

The Kanazawa retail sales branch and distribution centre opens in Ishikawa Prefecture.

2022: Tofu Catalán S.L. in Barcelona, Spain becomes a member of Somenoya group.

2023: Tofu Catalán's trade name changes to “SOMENOYA Barcelona”.

== Subsidiary Companies ==
- Yamashita Mitsu Shoten Co., Ltd.: 62-6 Shiraminechi, Hakusan-shi, Ishikawa, Japan
- Tofu Catalán S.L. (SOMENOYA Barcelona) - C/ d'Aribau 119, 08036 Barcelona, Spain
- THREE BIJIN SISTERS SDN. BHD (OOEDO TOFU/ 大江戸豆富) - Level 32 Menara Allianz Sentral, 203 Jaian Tun Sambanthan, 50470 Kuala Lumpur, Malaysia

== Gallery ==
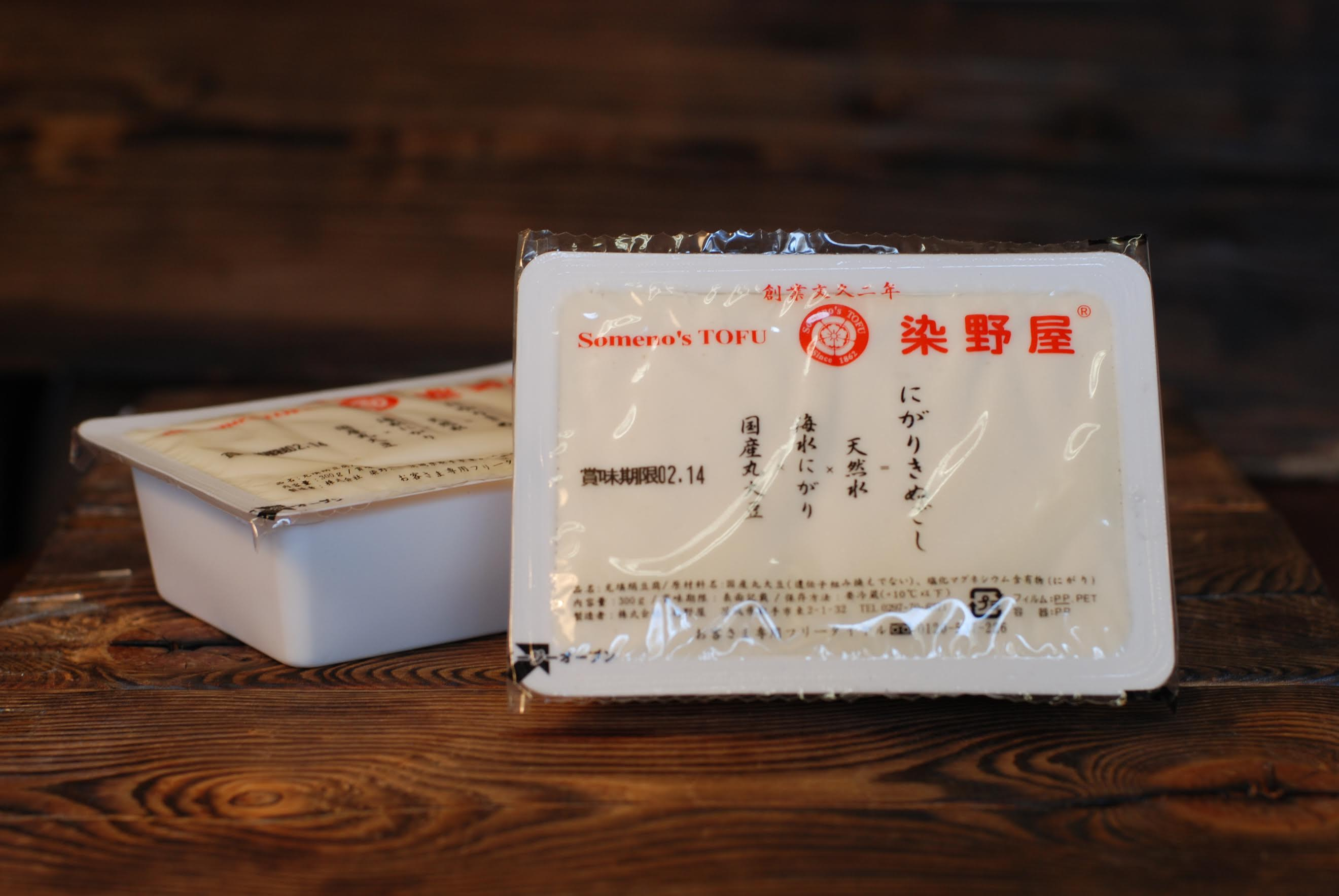
“Nigari-Kinugoshi” Silken tofu

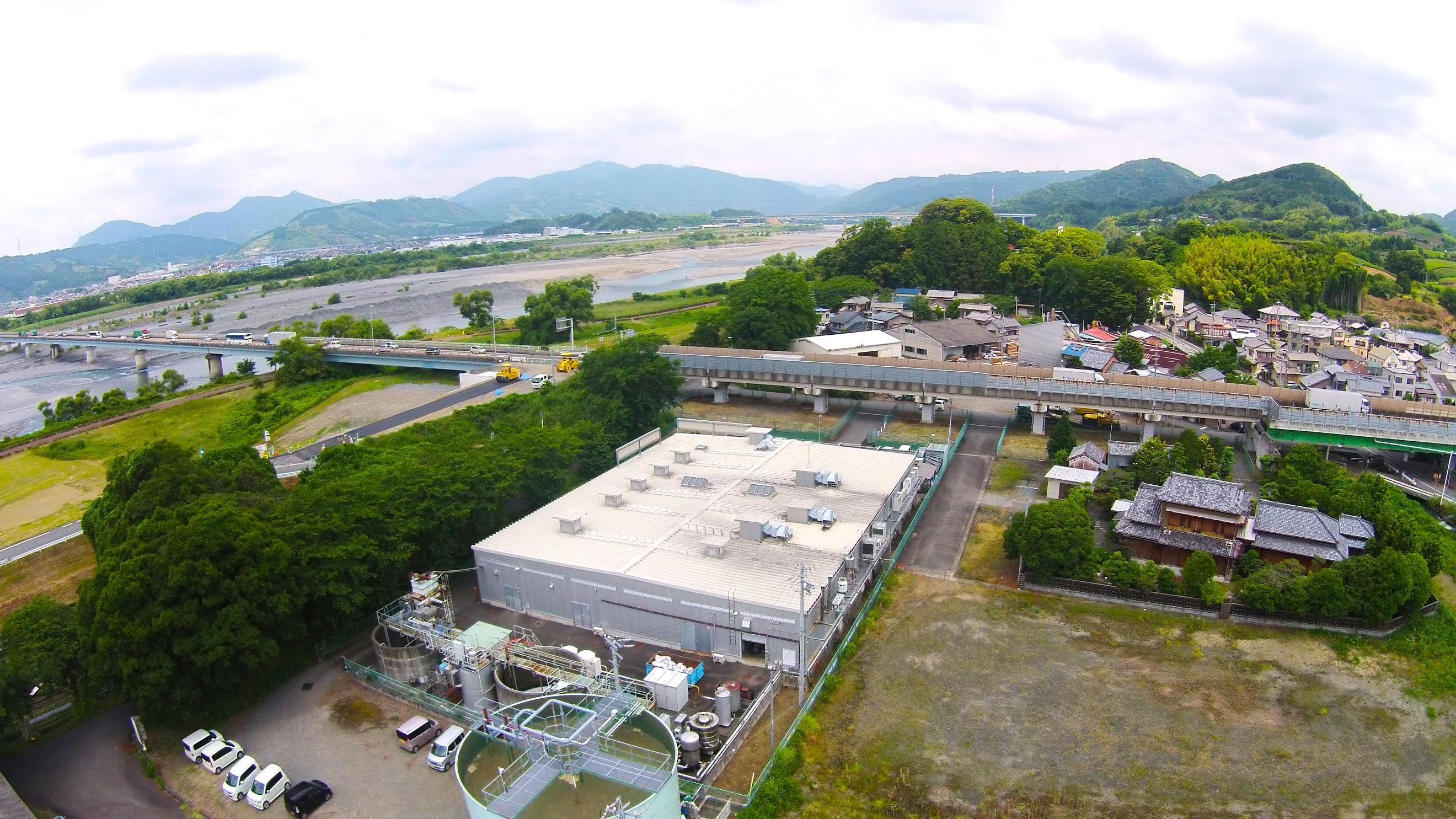
Shizuoka factory

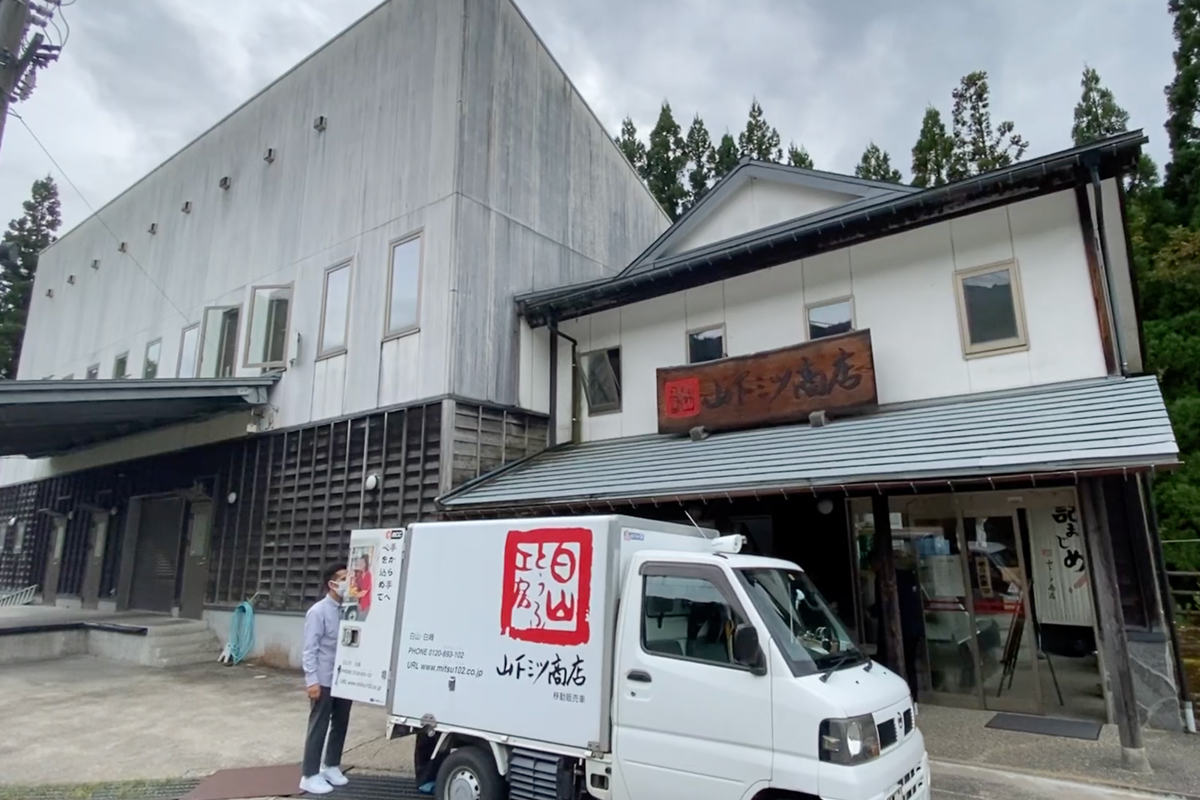
Yamashita Mitsu Shoten

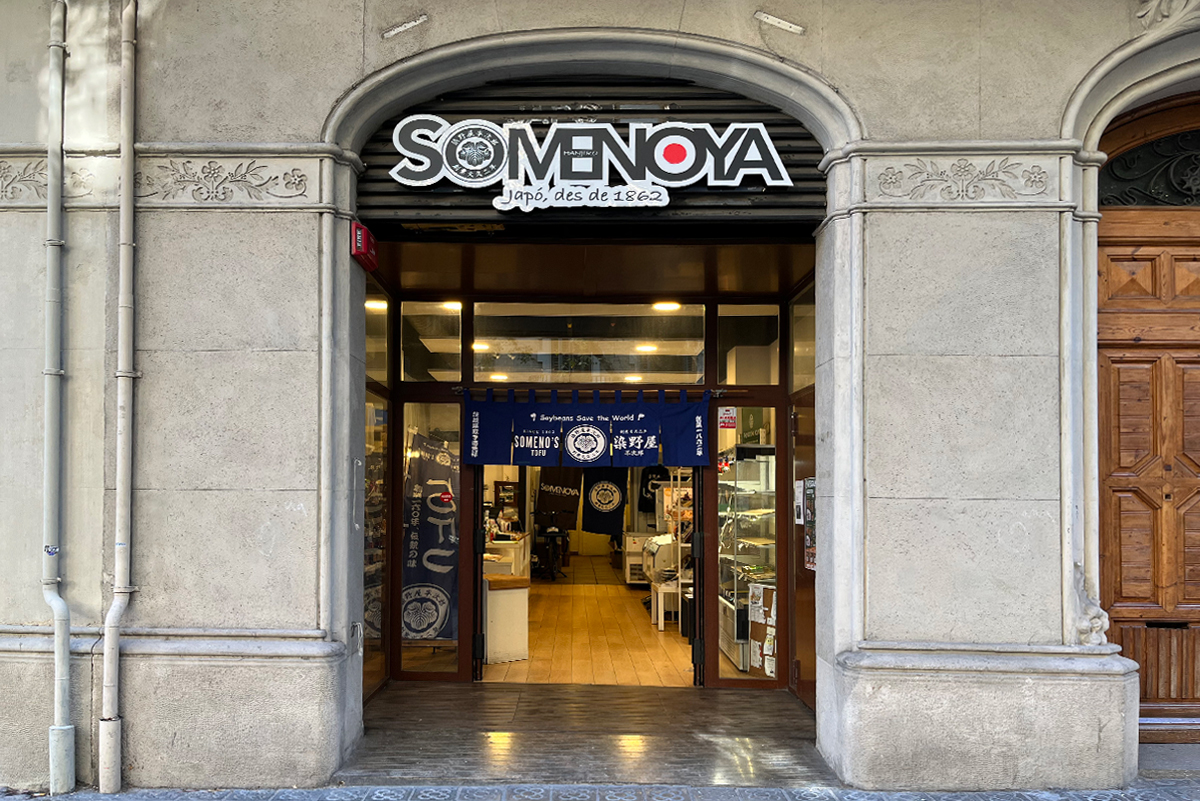
SOMENYA Barcelona

== See also ==
- List of vegetarian and vegan companies
