= Eden Foods Inc. =

American organic food company

Eden Foods
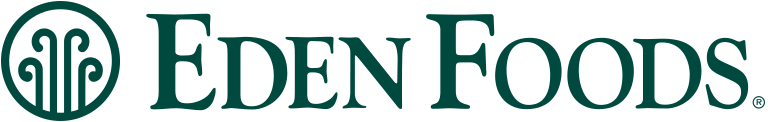
- Type: Corporation
- Founded: 1968
- Number of employees: 128 (April 2013)
- Website: edenfoods.com

Eden Foods, Inc., (also known as Eden Organic) is an organic food company based in Clinton, Michigan. It is best known for its Edensoy line of organic soy milk, and its line of organic Japanese foods and condiments. The company claims to be the oldest independent organic food producer in the United States, and the largest supplier of organic dry grocery items.

== History ==
Eden was founded in 1969 as a co-op grocery store in Ann Arbor, Michigan, to continue the operations of a defunct macrobiotic food buying club. Originally incorporated as a nonprofit, it became a for-profit company in 1970. In 1972, the company began importing Japanese foods such as miso and soy sauce for both the retail and commercial markets. Many of Eden's Japanese foods are still sourced in Japan.

Most of Eden Food's products are organic, most are certified kosher, and most are vegan, except for their katsuo (Japanese fish flakes). Many of Eden's prepared foods are also gluten-free, and have therefore been recommended for those on a gluten-free or gluten-free casein-free (GFCF) diet.

== Products ==
=== Soy milk ===
In 1997, an independent test by The New York Times looking for traces of GMOs in 11 soy and corn-based products found Eden's milk to be the only product that tested clean, a finding that Eden Foods attributed to their extensive certification and testing program.

In 2020, Organic Unsweetened Edensoy soy milk won the Lausanne Index Prize - Environmental Possibility Prize.

=== Soy sauce ===
In 2001, Eden shoyu soy sauce was rated highest for flavor by Cook's Illustrated in a comparison of 12 brands. In 2007, Eden's tamari was rated best out of seven brands tested in a comparison conducted by the San Francisco Chronicle for its "Taster's Choice" column.

=== Extra virgin olive oil ===
In 1999, Prevention Magazine rated Eden's "Extra Virgin Spanish Olive Oil" highest in flavor and protective nutrients out of the 22 brands of extra virgin olive oil studied.

=== Canned food ===
Eden uses BPA-free enamel-lined cans for most of its products (the only exception being tomato-based foods), and was subsequently recommended by the Center for Science in the Public Interest as a safer option for canned food.

In a 2005 study, Eden's canned refried beans were rated best in nutritional value among commercial refried beans by Men's Health Magazine.

== Controversies ==
=== Infant formula charges ===
In 1988, CEO Michael Potter was charged and later served 30 days in jail on misdemeanor charges for misrepresenting Edensoy soy milk as an infant formula. The suit was brought after a Canadian infant developed a rare eye and bone disorder as a result of vitamin deficiency from being fed the product. The child's physician later reported the patient to have "completely recovered".

=== Employee healthcare ===
In March 2013, Eden Foods filed suit against the Obama administration seeking an exemption from the mandate to cover contraception for its employees under the Affordable Care Act. According to the company's CEO Michael Potter, providing access to any form of contraceptives would have violated his beliefs as a Catholic. Eden Foods lost its suit in both the District Court and the 6th Circuit Court of Appeals (Eden v. Sebelius), and appealed to the Supreme Court. Following the decision made in the similar Burwell v. Hobby Lobby case, the US Supreme Court agreed to heard the Eden Foods v. Burwell case. In response, some customers urged a boycott of the company on popular liberal websites, as well as the company's own Facebook page.

=== Trademark infringement lawsuit ===
In October 2021, Eden Foods, Inc. filed suit against Eden Burger Ltd., a single-location vegan burger restaurant located on the campus of the Ohio State University, alleging infringement of Eden Foods's trademark on the word "Eden." Notably, although the Eden Foods, Inc. complaint notes Eden Foods's possession of trademarks on the word "Eden" for use in conjunction with the sale of numerous prepackaged food products, it does not appear to claim that Eden Foods possesses a trademark on the word "Eden" in the context of restaurants and catering.

=== Sexual harassment lawsuit ===
In April 2022, the Equal Employment Opportunity Commission filed suit against the owner/president of Eden Foods for repeatedly harassing female workers and ignoring complaints about his behavior. In Fall of 2023, Eden Foods was ordered to pay more than $182,500 in the settlement of the suit.

== See also ==
- Organic infant formula
- List of vegetarian and vegan companies
