= Goshen Alimentos =

Brazilian vegetarian and vegan food manufacturer

- Industry: Vegan food
- Founded: 2009; 16 years ago
- Headquarters: Ibiúna, São Paulo, Brazil
- Products: Soy beef, soy pudding, hamburgers, croquettes, sausages, steaks and tofu
- Website: https://goshen.com.br/

Goshen Food (Portuguese: Goshen Alimentos) is a Brazilian vegetarian and vegan food manufacturer. It was founded in March 2009 and is based in Ibiúna, São Paulo. It uses soya beans as the main ingredient in its products, which range from soy beef to soy pudding, hamburgers, croquettes, sausages and steaks. It also sells tofu.

== See also ==
- List of meat substitutes
- List of vegetarian and vegan companies
