= Tofurky =

American vegan turkey replacement

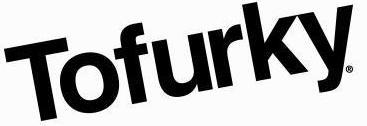

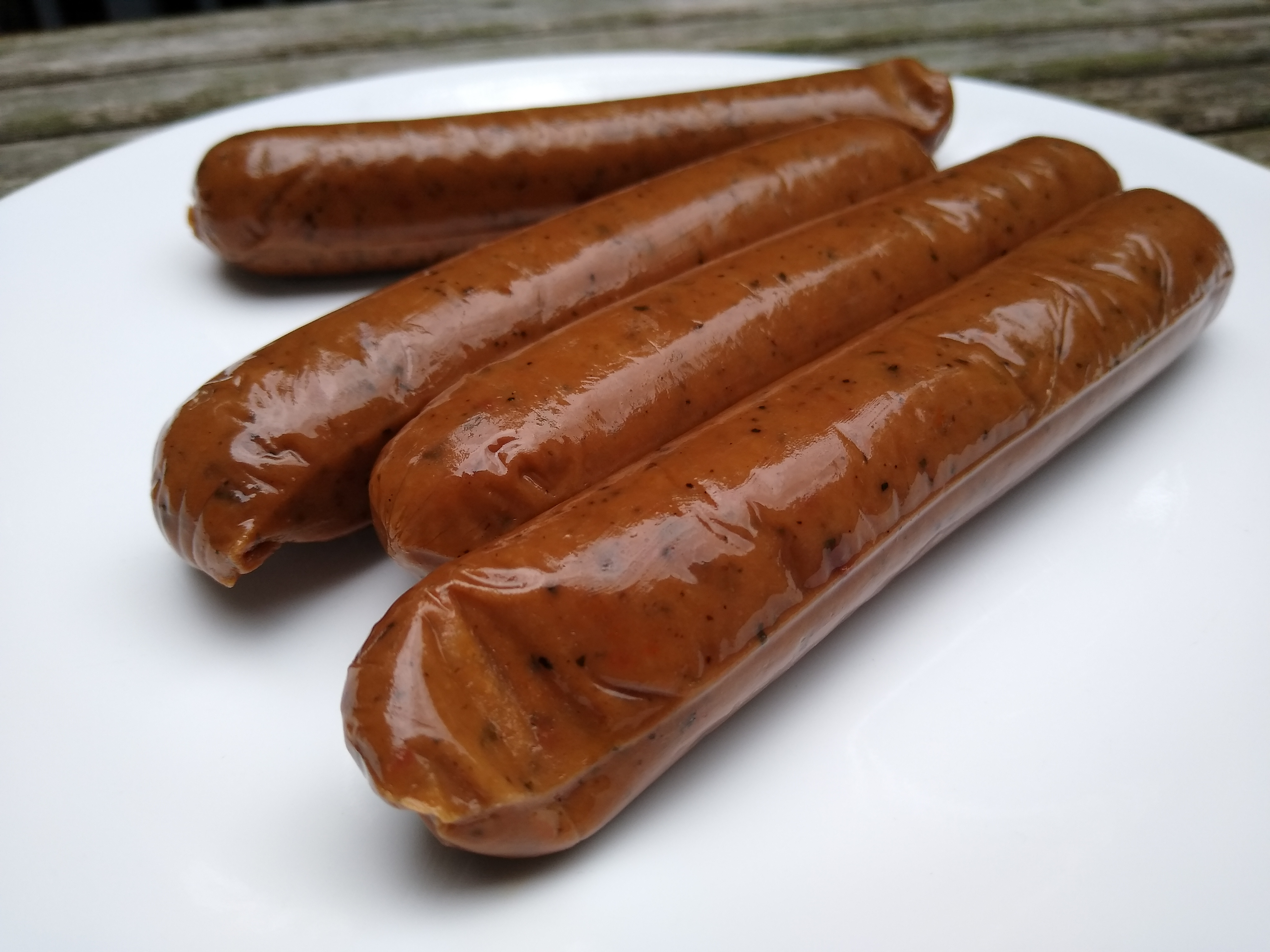
- Tofurky plant-based sausage

Tofurky is the brand name of an American vegan turkey replacement (also known as a meat analogue, or, more specifically, tofurkey) made from a blend of wheat protein and organic tofu. Tofurky brand was officially introduced in 1995.

Tofurky is a trademark of Turtle Island Foods, a company based in Hood River, Oregon, United States. Turtle Island has come to also use the brand name for most of its meatless products, such as deli slices, sausages, jerky, tempeh (its first product), burgers, and franks. All of the Tofurky products are fully vegan and approved by the Vegan Society, and most are kosher-certified by the Kosher Supervision of America. The product name is a portmanteau of "tofu" and "turkey" into a single word which sounds like a spoonerism of "faux turkey".

== History ==
Seth Tibbott, having become a vegetarian while in college founded Turtle Island Foods in 1980. The original Tofurky roast was created in collaboration with a local Portland, Oregon natural foods company called The Higher Taste, owned by Hans and Rhonda Wrobel and the Tofurky brand was officially introduced in 1995.

The original roast was reformulated in 1997 after Turtle Island Foods adopted a process incorporating wheat gluten, which produced a firmer texture after freezing and thawing. The stuffing was later changed from a bread-based filling to wild rice, while the accompanying products included in the holiday meal also changed over time. By 2017, the company was approaching sales of five million Tofurky holiday roasts.

As the brand expanded beyond its holiday roast, Turtle Island Foods introduced year-round plant-based products including deli slices, sausages, burgers and other meat substitutes. In 2011, the company announced plans for a new 33,000-square-foot production facility in Hood River, Oregon, which opened as part of an expansion of its manufacturing operations.

In 2023, Turtle Island Foods and the Tofurky brand were acquired by Morinaga Nutritional Foods, a subsidiary of Japan's Morinaga Milk Industry. Tofurky continued manufacturing its products at its Hood River facility following the acquisition.

Tofurky became one of the early nationally distributed plant-based meat brands in the United States, expanding from its holiday roast into year-round products including deli slices and sausages.

== Plant-based labeling litigation ==
Beginning in 2018, Tofurky became involved in a series of legal challenges to state laws restricting the use of meat-related terms on plant-based food labels. The company challenged labeling laws in Missouri, Arkansas, Louisiana and Oklahoma, arguing that terms such as "burger", "sausage", "hot dog" and "chorizo" did not mislead consumers when labels also clearly identified the products as plant-based or vegan.

In 2022, a federal district court ruled that portions of Arkansas's plant-based labeling law were unconstitutional and permanently barred their enforcement against Tofurky. The court found that Tofurky's labels clearly communicated that its products were plant-based and that the state had not demonstrated consumer confusion arising from the company's use of conventional meat terminology. A federal court also ruled against Louisiana's labeling restrictions in 2022, although an appellate court subsequently reinstated the law while interpreting it more narrowly to apply to products intentionally misrepresented as animal-derived foods.

In 2023, Tofurky and the Plant Based Foods Association challenged a Texas law requiring plant-based meat products to display terms such as "meatless" or "plant-based" in type at least as prominent as the product name. In January 2026, the United States District Court for the Western District of Texas ruled that the requirement violated the First Amendment, finding that Tofurky's existing labels were not misleading.

== Purchase ==
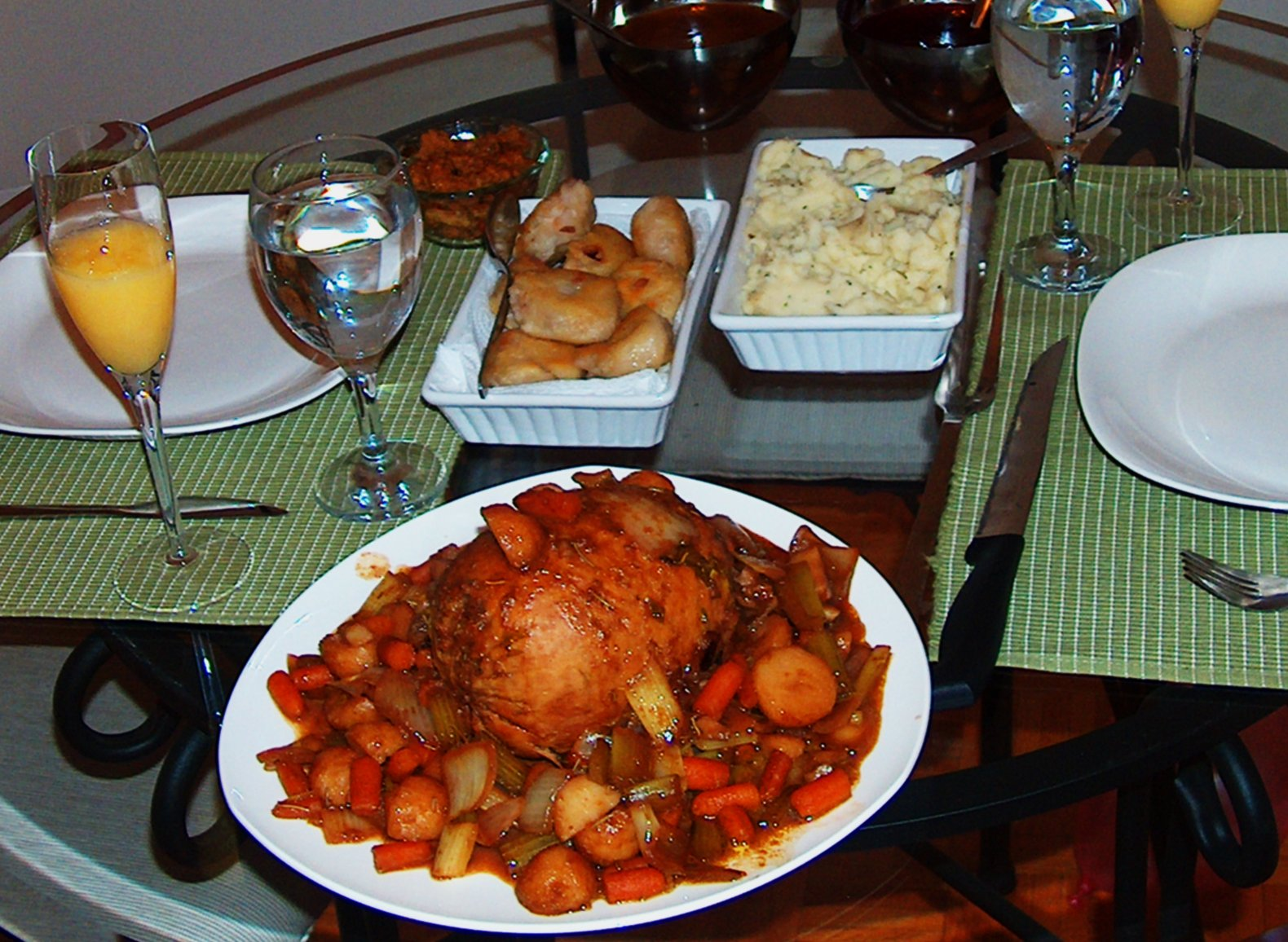
A Tofurky dinner

The Tofurky roast is found in health food grocery stores; however, availability is limited in some areas. Inside the box, it comes in the form of a small but dense roast, wrapped tightly in a disposable casing, and is something of a rounded loaf in shape. It comes stuffed with mushrooms, herbs, and wild rice. Though the roast can be purchased separately, it is also offered as part of a meal with cranberry-apple-potato dumplings, gravy, and "wishstix" made from Tofurky Jurky, a meatless jerky product. The Whole Foods store chain is a major seller of Tofurky products.

Tofurky is a popular meat alternative amongst many vegetarians, who avoid turkey for ethical and/or personal reasons. The product is free from turkey and other meat products. The Green Stars Project awarded Tofurky 5/5 green stars for overall social and environmental impact.

== Nutrition and health ==
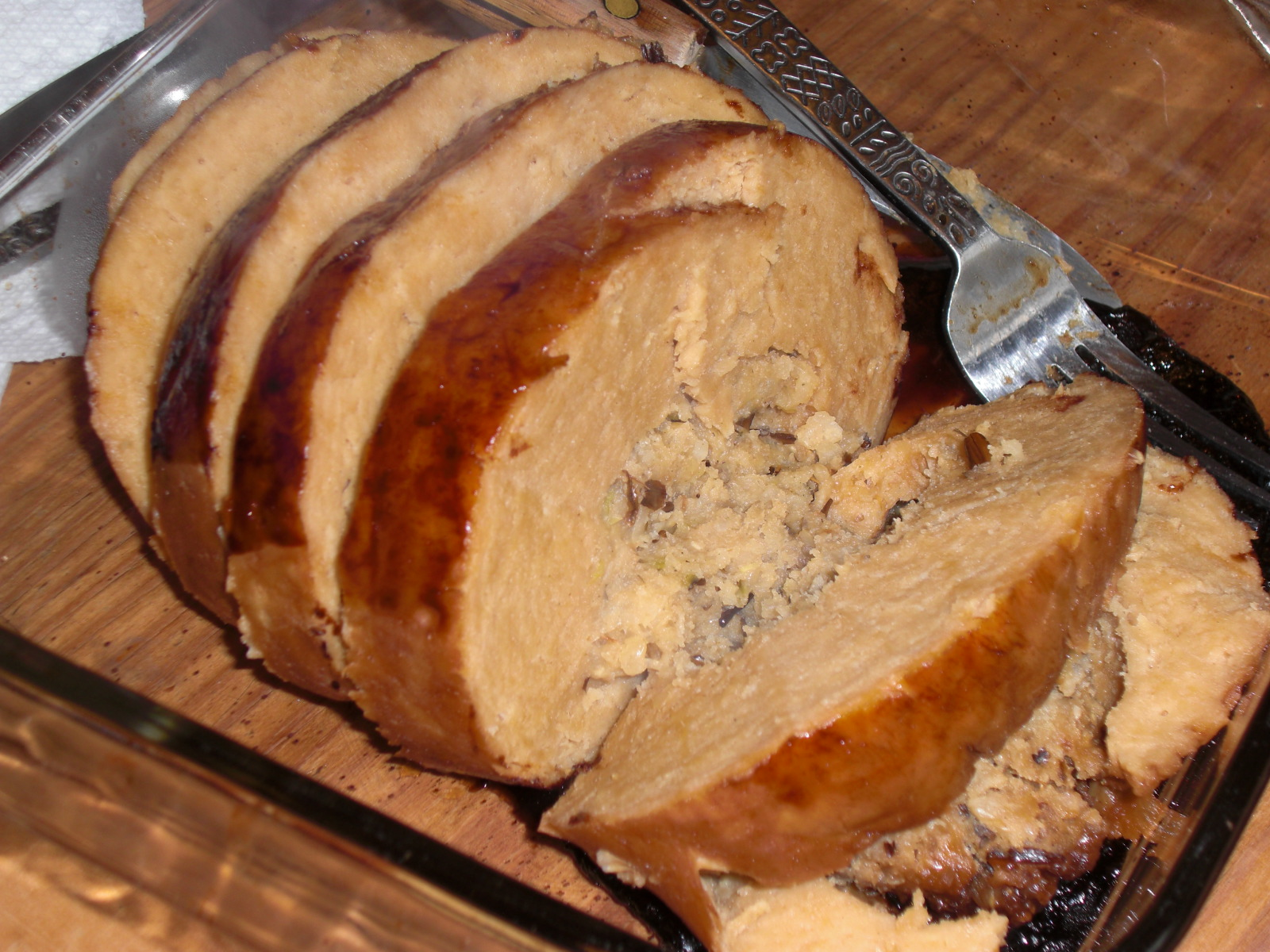
A Tofurky roast

Nutritional information for equal servings of Tofurky and equivalent meat products is available online, allowing interested people to compare sodium, fat, cholesterol, and protein. The company does not use trans fat and the product has no cholesterol since it is 100% vegan.

Turtle Foods has indicated that it no longer uses certain controversial soy products and only uses non-GMO soybeans. The roast is vegan, which also means it is suitable for those with egg or milk allergies; but for those who suffer from allergies to the soy and/or wheat gluten used in most meat alternatives, Tofurky is not an option.

== Preparation ==
The Tofurky is pre-stuffed and sealed at the ends to enclose the stuffing. It cooks in one hour and fifteen minutes if thawed or three hours and fifteen minutes if frozen. Because the product has a uniform texture, it slices easily. Tofurky is seitan and soy based and was created to have a texture similar to that of meat products; the vegetable-based turkey-like flavorings are intended to make it comparable to traditional Thanksgiving fare. In order to make the product as similar to flesh as they intended, its creators designed the roast so that it tears off at a 45-degree angle with the grain.

== See also ==
- Daiya
- List of meat substitutes
- Macrobiotic diet
- Nut roast, a typically home-made, nut based main dish
- Tofurkey, common name for some kinds of turkey alternatives served at holidays
- Veggie burger
