= Amy's Kitchen =

Organic convenience food company

Amy's Kitchen, Inc.
- Trade name: Amy's
- Type: Private
- Founded: 1987; 39 years ago
- Founders: Andy and Rachel Berliner
- Headquarters: Petaluma, California
- Key people: Andy Berliner (CEO/Executive Chairman); Paul Schiefer (President)
- Revenue: ▲$500 million
- Number of employees: 2,700 (2022)
- Website: amys.com

Amy's Kitchen, Inc., doing business as Amy's, is a family-owned, privately held American company based in Petaluma, California, that manufactures organic and non-GMO convenience and frozen foods. Founded in 1987 by Andy and Rachel Berliner, and incorporated in 1988, the company took its name from their daughter, Amy. All of Amy's 250+ products are vegetarian and made with organic ingredients. The company has also operated vegetarian fast food restaurants in California under the name Amy's Drive Thru.

== History ==
The co-founders of Amy's Kitchen, Andy, and Rachel Berliner, had prior experience in the organic food business. Rachel's family had grown organic vegetables and fruits since the 1950s. Andy was formerly the president and majority shareholder of the Magic Mountain herb tea company.

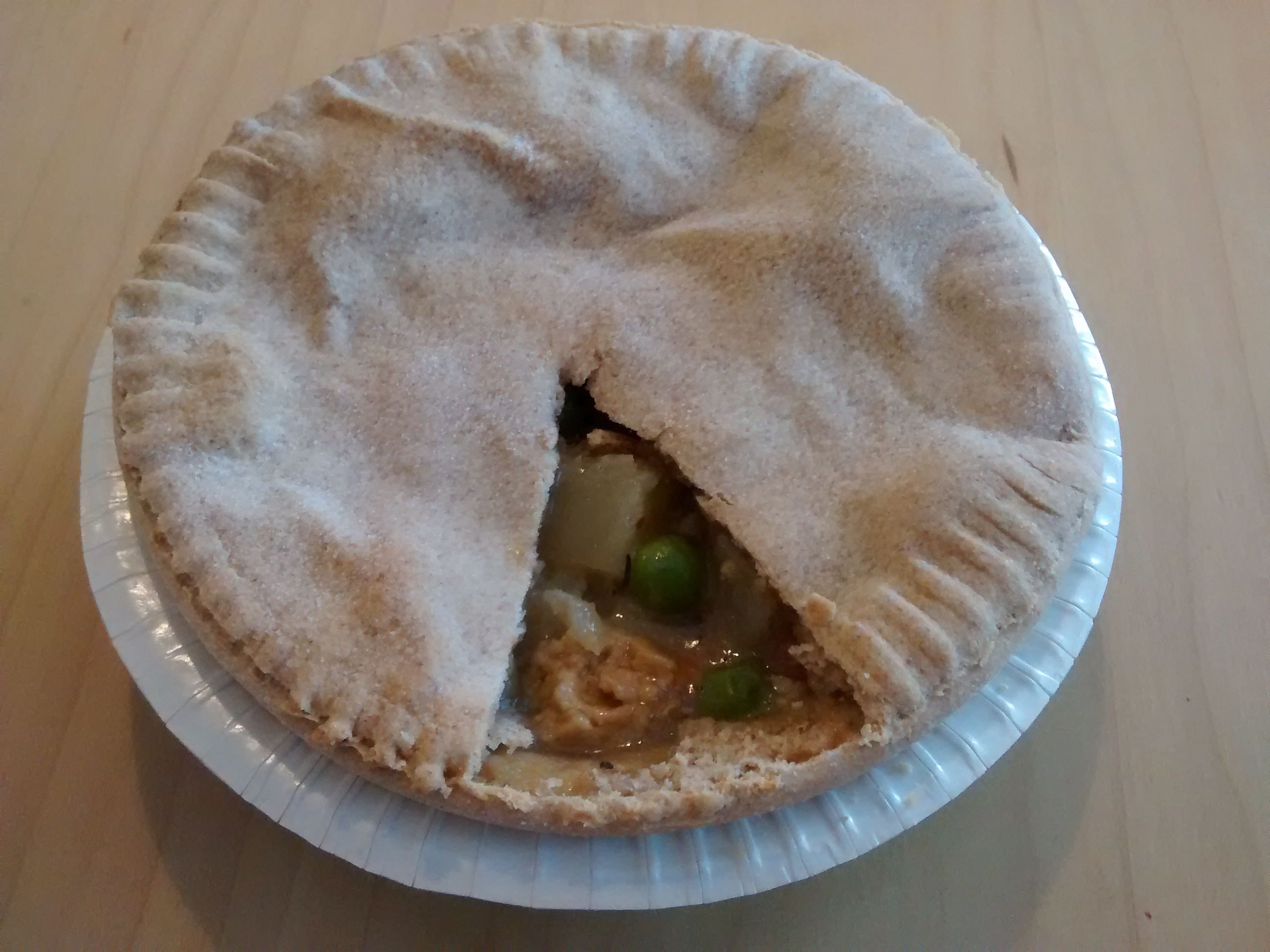
Amy's vegetable pot pie

The company's first product was the vegetable pot pie. After mounting a booth at a natural products exhibition, the Berliners began receiving orders from small natural grocers around the country. They soon opened a production facility in Sonoma County, California.

Started in 2000 by Founders Andy and Rachel Berliner, the Amy's Scholarship Program was designed to provide access to higher education for Amy's Kitchen employees. Since its inception, the program has proudly awarded over 1,500 scholarships, amounting to $1.5 million.

Amy's employs over 2,600 people and its corporate headquarters is in Petaluma, California. It operates processing plants in Santa Rosa, California, Medford, Oregon, and Pocatello, Idaho,

Amy's Kitchen supports non-GMO food and GMO labeling initiatives, and was a major sponsor of Farm Aid's annual benefit concert in 2012, 2013, and 2014.

In May 2017, the company hired a new global president, former Mars Inc. executive Xavier Unkovic who had worked as global president of Mars Drinks, CEO of Royal Canin Canada and CEO of Royal Canin USA. Unkovic was promoted to CEO in August 2020 but left in May 2021.

Because Amy's is a private entity, its annual earnings are not public. It reported gross sales of over $300 million in 2012 on CNBC's "How I Made My Millions." In 2017, the company's revenue was reportedly over $500 million per year in the U.S., the U.K., and France, and was expanding financially in Asia and Australia. In 2020, it rose to $600 million per year with demand from the coronavirus pandemic.

Amy's also operates a food relief program in the communities where they operate. During the height of the COVID-19 pandemic in 2020, Amy's donated approximately 700,000 meals. In 2022, Amy's donated more than 714,000 meals to their communities.

The company achieved B Corporation certification in late 2020.

Amy's Kitchen named Paul Schiefer as company president in 2023 after he served as interim president for its drive-thru division.

=== Safety violations and labor relations ===
Amy's was criticized for its working conditions and paid $26,025 to the Occupational Safety and Health Administration. In January 2022, Cal/OSHA's records show an investigator visited the plant on three days. The company was fined $6,825 for one serious violation and 8 other infractions after the company's Santa Rosa production plant inspections. These issues were corrected in weeks. Regulators found the company did not ensure that machines to prepare tortillas had proper safety guards secured over hazardous machine components. On the same day, investigators found that emergency eyewash stations were either not reachable within 10 seconds or were not kept free of obstacles.

In 2022, the company was accused of union busting. In June 2022, workers at its San Jose facility filed a claim over unsafe working conditions. In August, the same plant was shut down citing widespread supply chain disruptions and fluctuating consumer demand. UNITE HERE alleged Amy's Kitchen disciplined employees for participation in labor activities prior to the shutdown.

== Products ==
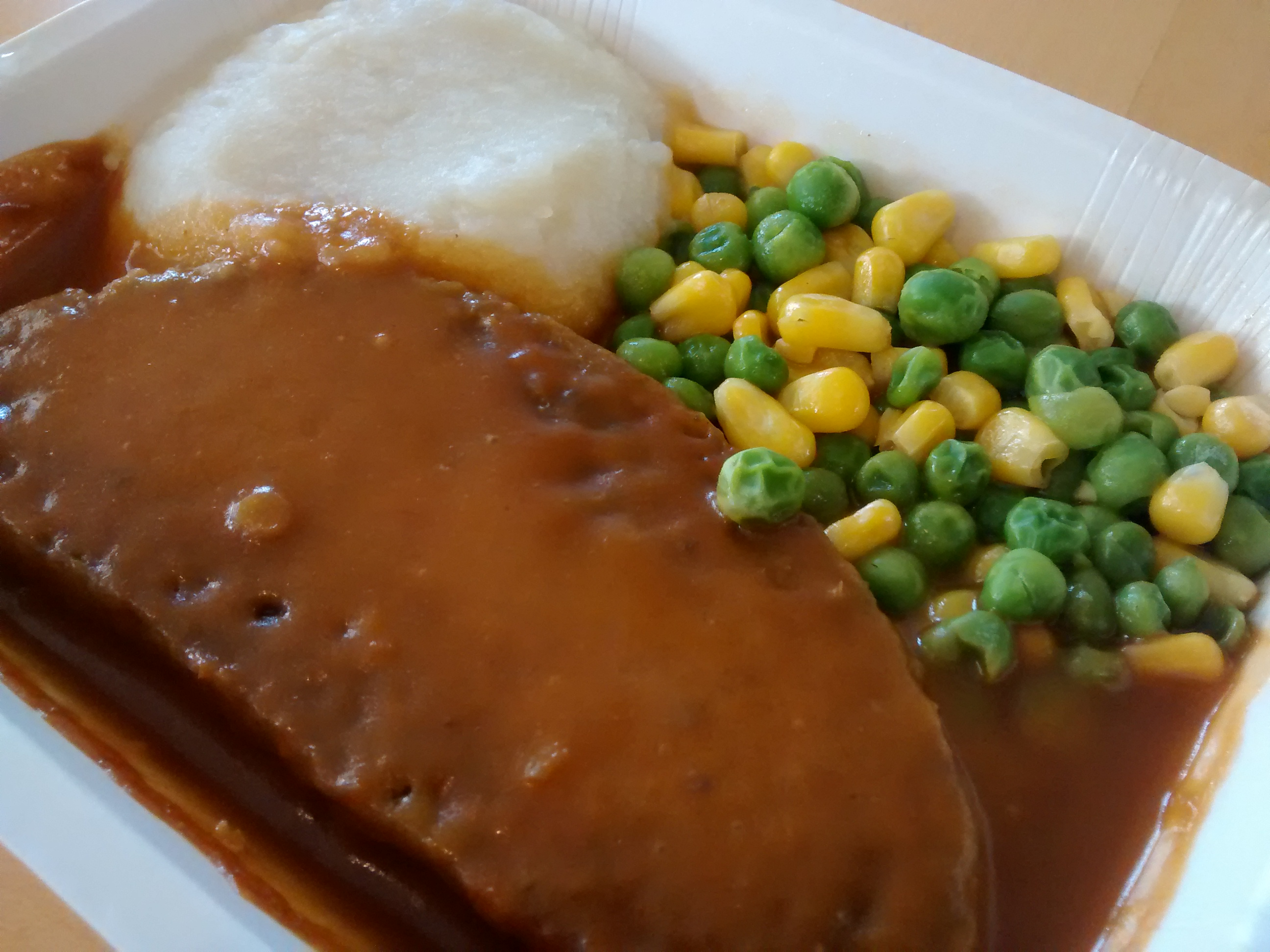
Amy's veggie loaf with mashed potatoes and vegetables

As of 2017, the company makes more than 250 organic products in 27 categories, including burritos, bowls, pizza, wraps, soup, chili, and candy. All of Amy's products are vegetarian. Amy's products do not contain meat, seafood, eggs, animal rennet, peanuts, bioengineered ingredients, or hydrogenated oils.

The majority of the food products have Kosher certification; there are a small number that still do not as the company is still in the process of transitioning to 100% Kosher as of 2020. The company has over 120 vegan offerings and makes over 130 gluten-free products. In 2023, the company introduced family-sized versions of top products. The company serves over 14 million consumers a year.

== Amy's Drive Thru ==
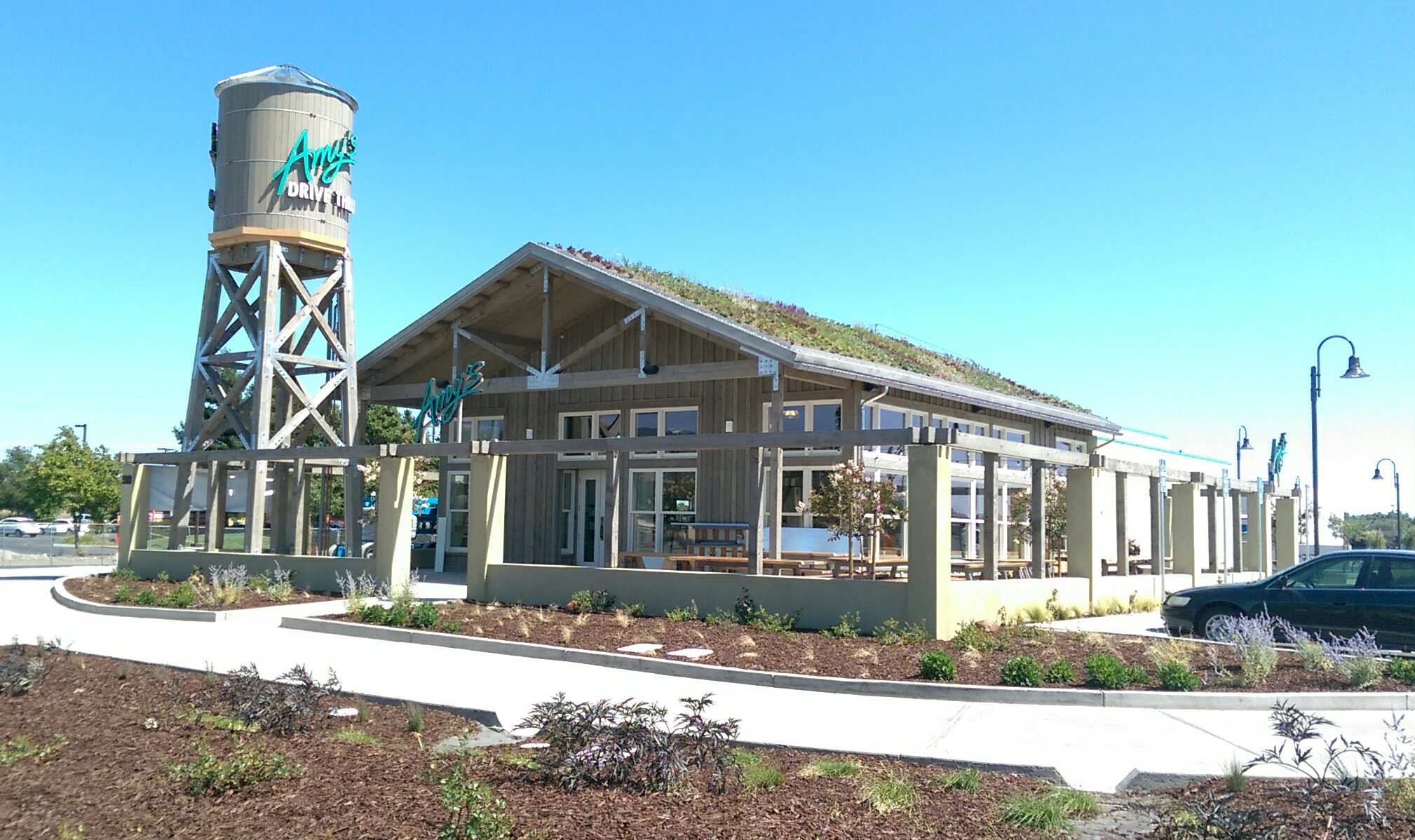
Amy's Drive Thru in Rohnert Park, California

On July 20, 2015, Amy's Kitchen opened a drive-through vegetarian fast-food restaurant in Rohnert Park, California. It served vegetarian, vegan and gluten free menu options including veggie burgers. In July 2019, a takeout location was opened at San Francisco International Airport in the newly remodeled Harvey Milk Terminal 1. Additional freestanding Amy's Drive Thru restaurants later opened in August 2020 in Corte Madera, in 2021 in Roseville, and in October 2023 in Thousand Oaks.

The Roseville and Thousand Oaks restaurants closed in February 2024, and the Corte Madera location closed in August 2025. The Rohnert Park restaurant closed on March 8, 2026, and the San Francisco International Airport location on March 25, 2026.

== See also ==
- List of vegetarian and vegan companies
