= Earth Fare =

American health and wellness supermarket

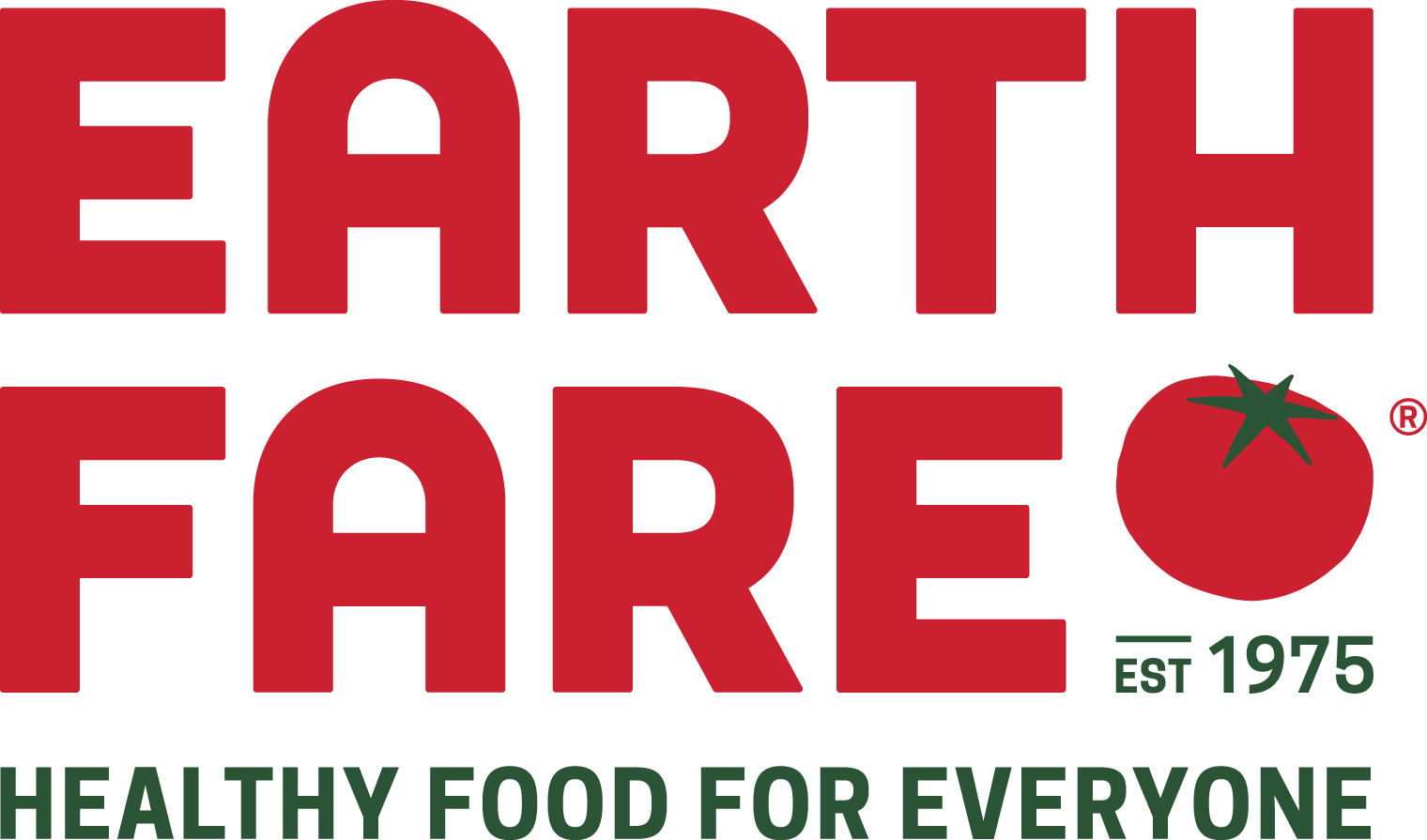

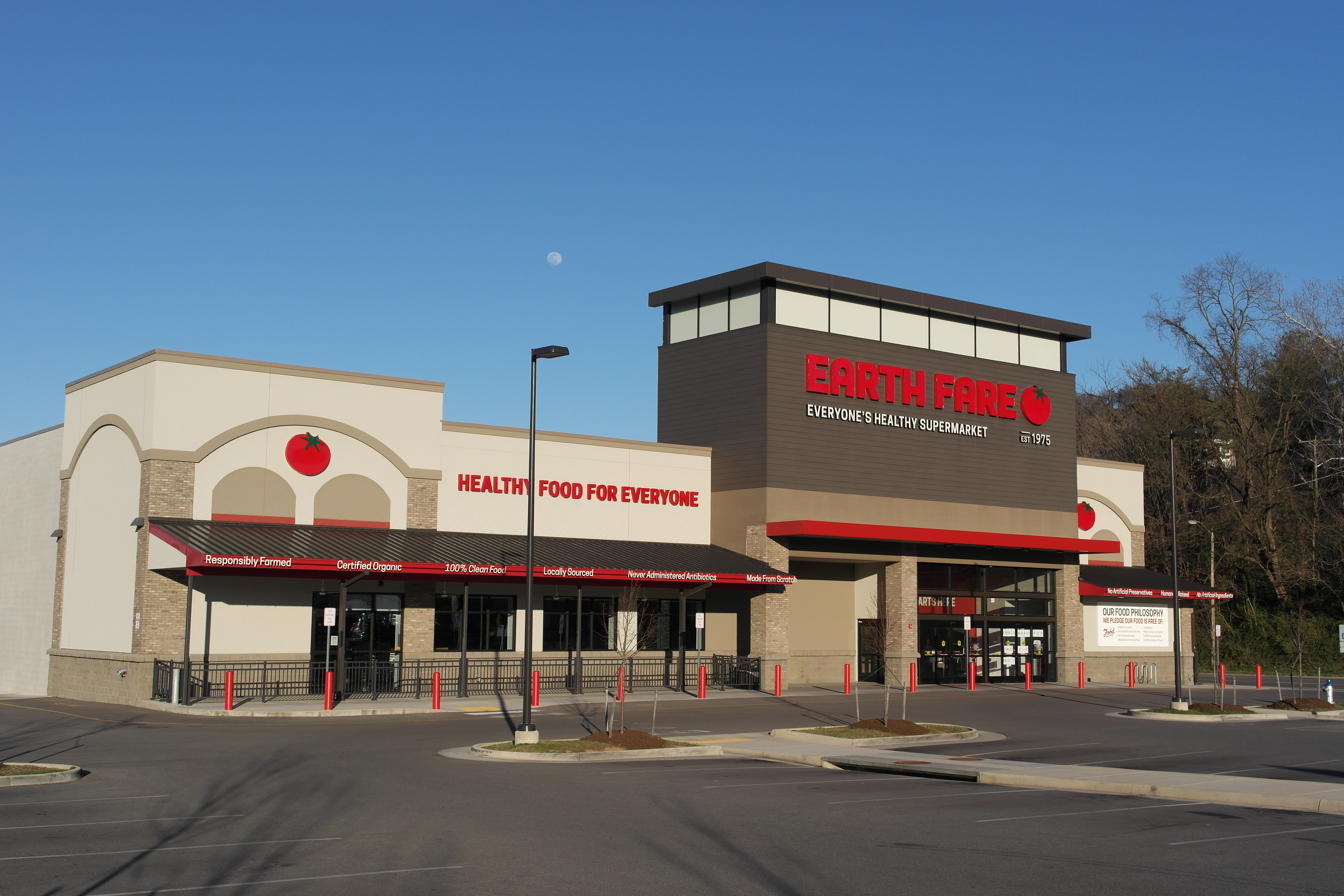
- Earth Fare store in Roanoke, Virginia
- Type: Private
- Industry: Natural Foods
- Founded: 1975; 51 years ago (as original company); June 22, 2020; 6 years ago (revival)
- Successor: Reopened June 22, 2020
- Headquarters: Asheville, North Carolina
- Number of locations: 14 (As of July 30, 2025)
- Products: Specialty, Local, Organic & Natural Foods
- Number of employees: 2,500+
- Website: https://www.earthfare.com/

Earth Fare is an American health and wellness supermarket with 14 locations in six states primarily in the southeastern United States. It sells natural and organic food that the company claimed to have the highest product standards in the United States (free of various artificial additives, high-fructose corn syrup, hormones and antibiotics), and was one of the largest natural and organic food retailers in the country. After closing all stores in February 2020, three locations reopened in June 2020. As of 2026, Earth Fare have 13 locations.

== History ==
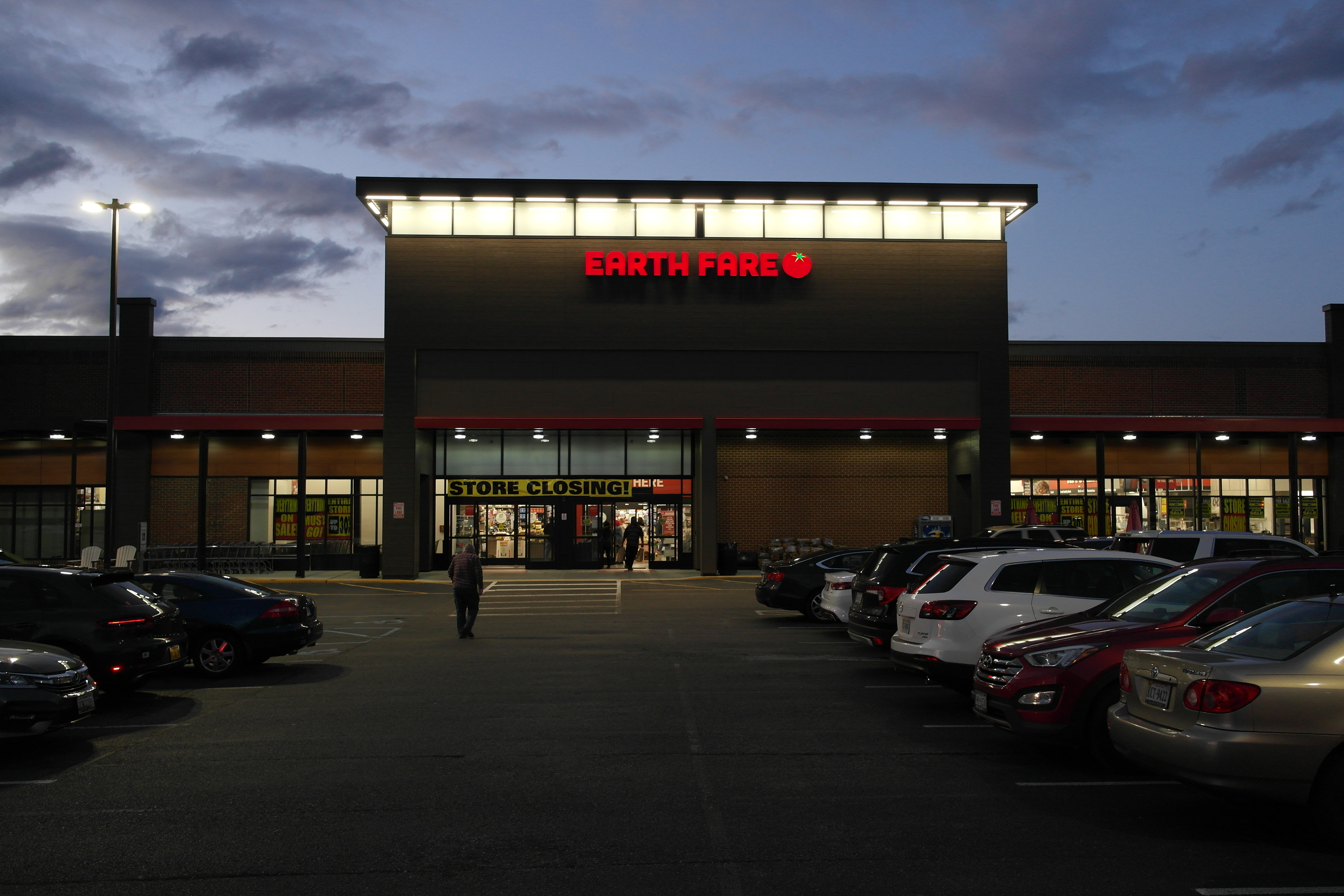
Earth Fare in Williamsburg, Virginia, during its liquidation sale.

Founded by Roger Derrough in 1975, the first store opened its doors in Asheville, North Carolina as "Dinner for the Earth". Initially, Dinner for the Earth offered only organic dried bulk foods in wood barrels and wellness products on handmade shelves. With new partner Randy Talley, the store rebranded as Earth Fare in a new larger location in 1994, transitioning from a specialty store to a full-service store with expanded offerings of products, like craft beer and artisanal cheeses. Two years later, the store expanded to a second location in Charleston, South Carolina, and thereafter continued its expansion to "mid-sized metros, with the savvy and wealth to support a healthy supermarket and no competition in the niche."

In 2012, the Earth Fare chain was purchased by Oak Hill Capital.

== Products ==
All products the store carried were free of high fructose corn syrup, artificial fats, artificial trans fats, artificial colors, artificial flavors, artificial preservatives, artificial sweeteners, bleached or bromated flour, never administered antibiotics or added growth hormones. The company claims to have the highest standard in its organic produce in North America.

While it sold food from around the world, the company also operated the policy of "100 mile Commitment" to sell as much local produce as possible from within a 100-mile radius of the store.

== Store locations ==
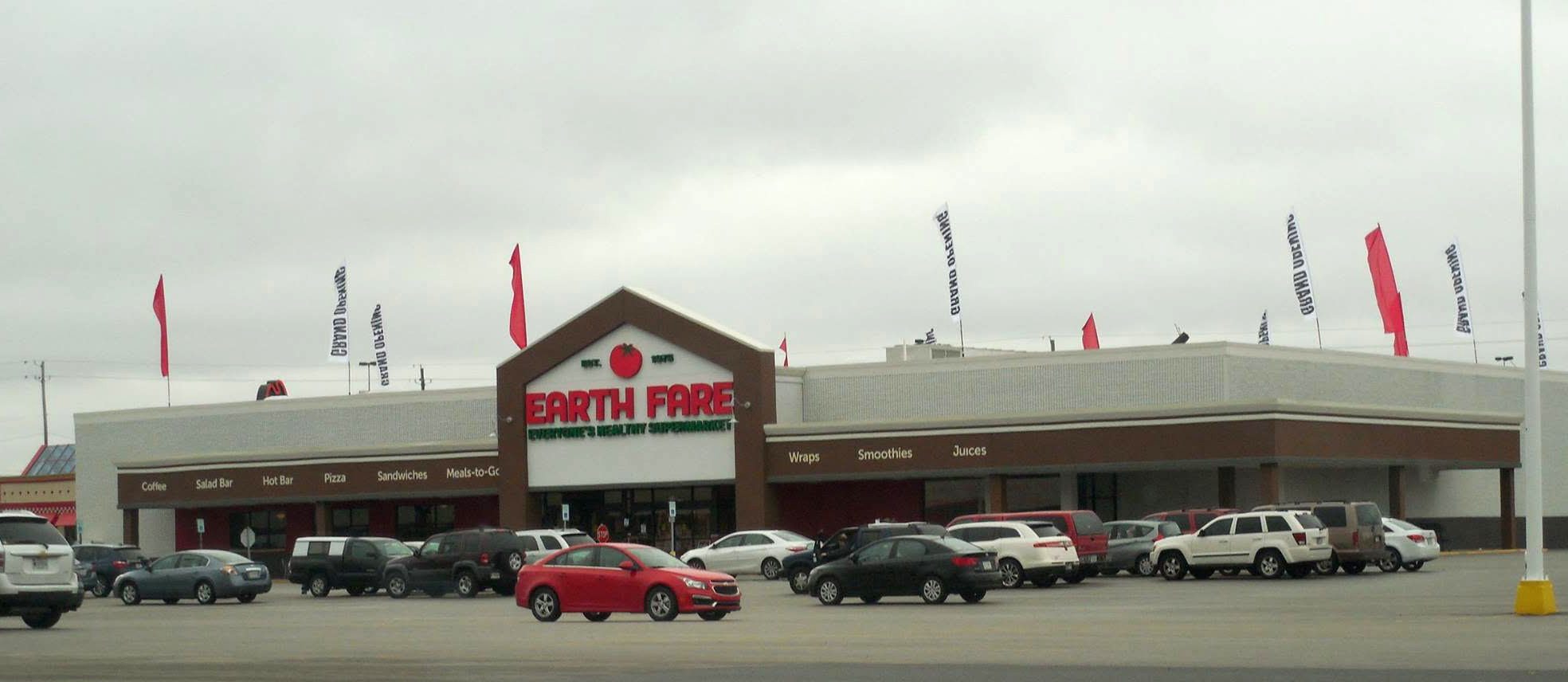
An example of an Earth Fare. This one is the former Greenwood, Indiana location.

At its peak, Earth Fare operated 50 stores in ten states: Alabama, Florida, Georgia, Indiana, Michigan, North Carolina, South Carolina, Tennessee and Virginia. As of July 2025, the chain currently operates 14 locations across 6 states: North Carolina, South Carolina, Virginia, Tennessee, and 1 location in Florida, and Georgia.

Earth Fare expanded into Virginia in November 2017 with three locations in Roanoke, Fairfax, and Williamsburg. While by 2019, Earth Fare had planned fifty additional stores by 2024, the company closed two locations in Atlanta, Georgia, and one location in Columbus, Ohio in 2018. Earth Fare's Gainesville, Florida and Fairfax, Virginia locations closed in January 2020.

== Bankruptcy, liquidation and reopening ==
On February 3, 2020, Earth Fare announced that it was going out of business and liquidating all of its stores. The company cited "continued challenges in the retail industry" as a reason it could not refinance its outstanding debt, further adding that it was "not in a financial position to continue to operate on a go forward basis." One day later, the company announced that it had filed for Chapter 11 bankruptcy protection in the U.S. Bankruptcy Court in Wilmington, Delaware. It listed liabilities of $100 million to $500 million and assets of $100 million to $500 million. All locations closed by February 25, 2020.

Four months after shuttering the entire chain, an investment from Hulsing Enterprises of Asheville, North Carolina, and its CEO Dennis Hulsing helped the original Earth Fare founders to revive the brand and begin to reopen certain locations. First to reopen was the Westgate Earth Fare in Asheville on June 22. The second and third locations to reopen are in Roanoke, Virginia, and Boone, North Carolina, with five other locations earmarked to resume operations in Athens, Georgia, Summerville, South Carolina, and Rock Hill, South Carolina. Most of the other former Earth Fare locations in the southeastern U.S. were sold to other retailers during the bankruptcy proceedings earlier in 2020.

The chain also announced its first completely new location—as opposed to a reopening of a shuttered location—would open in early 2021 in Christiansburg, Virginia. In February 2022, an e-mail was sent to Earth Fare customers stating that the store in Saint Johns, Florida, was closing just months after re-opening; on February 17, 2022, liquidation sales began at 50% off storewide.

In July 2025, Earth Fare closed its last Ohio location in Canton, Ohio.

As of 2026, Earth Fare operated 13 locations across the United States.
