= Turtle Island Foods =

American maker of Tofurky

- Industry: Food products
- Founded: 1980 in Forest Grove, Oregon, United States
- Founder: Seth Tibbott
- Headquarters: Hood River, Oregon, United States
- Areas served: United States, Canada
- Key people: Jaime Aithos (CEO)
- Products: Meat analogue roasts (Tofurky) tempeh
- Revenue: ▲$14 million (2011)
- Website: tofurky.com

Turtle Island Foods is an American subsidiary of Japanese company Morinaga Milk that was founded in 1980 in Forest Grove, Oregon. Its headquarters are in Hood River. The company produces Tofurky, a popular vegetarian and vegan alternative to turkey, as well other meatless products. All of the company's products are vegan, and most are kosher-certified by the Kosher Services of America. Turtle Island Foods is also the first company in the United States to have their products approved by The Vegan Society in the United Kingdom. In 2023, the company was acquired by Japanese firm Morinaga Milk.

== History ==
The company name is derived from a common legend found amongst the native people of North America. Once, when all of earth was underwater, a turtle offered its shell as a home for land animals, and that shell became North America. As a result, several Native American and First Nations refer to the continent as "Turtle Island."

Headquartered in Hood River, Oregon, Turtle Island Foods began in 1980 in Forest Grove with intentions "to create delicious, nutritious, convenient and affordable vegetarian food." It was founded by Seth Tibbott, who began by producing tempeh for friends and family. Tibbot was inspired to create meat substitutes after having become a vegetarian in college. According to Tibbot, the first twenty years of the company had not been economically fruitful, and he built tree houses on a neighbor's property in Husum, Washington, which he rented out to tenants for additional income. With the help of family, Tibbot eventually expanded his company to what is now the second largest tempeh producer in the United States.

The company developed Tofurky in 1995, and initially sold in local markets in Portland, Oregon. During the Thanksgiving season of 1995, the company sold a total of 500 of their Tofurky roasts. In the early 2000s, the company began to grow considerably, shipping a record-breaking 201,108 of their Tofurky roasts in 2006, a 27% increase from the year prior.

In 2008, Turtle Island became a sponsor of the Humane Society of the United States, the first food processor to do so in the society's history.

In 2011, the company announced plans to build a new plant in Hood River at a cost of $10 million with a goal to achieve a LEED platinum certification on the building. The new 33,000-square-foot (3,100 m^{2}) plant opened in October 2012.

== Ecological responsibility ==
Since 1995, when Turtle Island Foods took an official stand against GMOs, they have made "every effort possible" to avoid them. Much of what the company produces is organic, and Turtle Island Foods is certified by Oregon Tilth. According to the Cornucopia Institute, Turtle Island uses tofu sourced from 100% organically farmed soybeans, and all manufacturing of products is done in the company's facility. The Green Stars Project awarded Tofurky 5/5 green stars for overall social and environmental impact.

The company refuses food ingredients made with hexane solvent extraction, choosing instead expeller pressed isolates and concentrates.

In 2005, Turtle Island Foods began to purchase all of its electricity from the Blue Sky renewable energy project. All paperboard packaging is recycled. In addition, a certain percentage of each year's Tofurky sales is donated to an environmental charity.

== Products ==
Turtle Island Foods currently produces the following, many in a number of varieties:

- Tofurky Roast
- Tofurky Deli Slices
- Tofurky Sausages
- Tofurky Hot Dogs and Jumbo Dogs
- Tofurky Jurky
- Tofurky "Giblet" Gravy
- Superburgers
- Tempeh

== In popular culture ==
In November 2014, Seattle mayor Ed Murray pardoned a Tofurky at Seattle City Hall.

== See also ==
- List of meat substitutes
- List of vegetarian and vegan companies
- List of companies based in Oregon

== Sources ==
- Shurtleff, William; Aoyagi, Akiko (2014). History of Meat Alternatives (965 CE to 2014): Extensively Annotated Bibliography and Sourcebook. Soy Info Center. ISBN 978-1-928-91471-6.
