= Prime Roots =

- Company type: Privately held company
- Industry: Plant-based meat
- Founded: 2017
- Founder: Joshua Nixon; Kimberlie Le
- Headquarters: San Francisco, California, United States
- Area served: United States
- Products: Koji-Meat; Koji-Charcuteri; Koji-Bacon
- Website: www.primeroots.com

Prime Roots (also known as Terramino Foods) is an American koji-based meat-producing company focusing on deli and charcuterie products.

== History ==
Prime Roots was founded in 2017 by Joshua Nixon and Kimberlie Le. It produces non-GMO meat alternatives, and meat-free alternative seafood products, from a protein-rich and nutrient-dense fungi. It uses Aspergillus oryzae, or kōji mold, which has historically been used to ferment soy sauce, miso, sake and douchi. Kōji is also used as an imitation meat in haute cuisine. The fungus is a whole protein, with a filamentous structure that is texturally similar to muscle fiber.

In December 2017, Terramino Foods (now known as Prime Roots) closed their first seed funding round raising $250,000 in capital and raising $4.25 million in second seed funding in July 2018 from IndieBio and SOSV respectively. In May 2023, it raised $30 million in series B funding to expand its operations US-wide.

In June 2023, it announced a partnership with UK-based mycoprotein product manufacturer Quorn, and in January 2024, Prime Roots was featured in You Are What You Eat: A Twin Experiment, a Netflix vegan documentary.

== See also ==
- Beyond Meat
- Aspergillus oryzae
- Impossible Foods
