= Ripple Foods =

American company

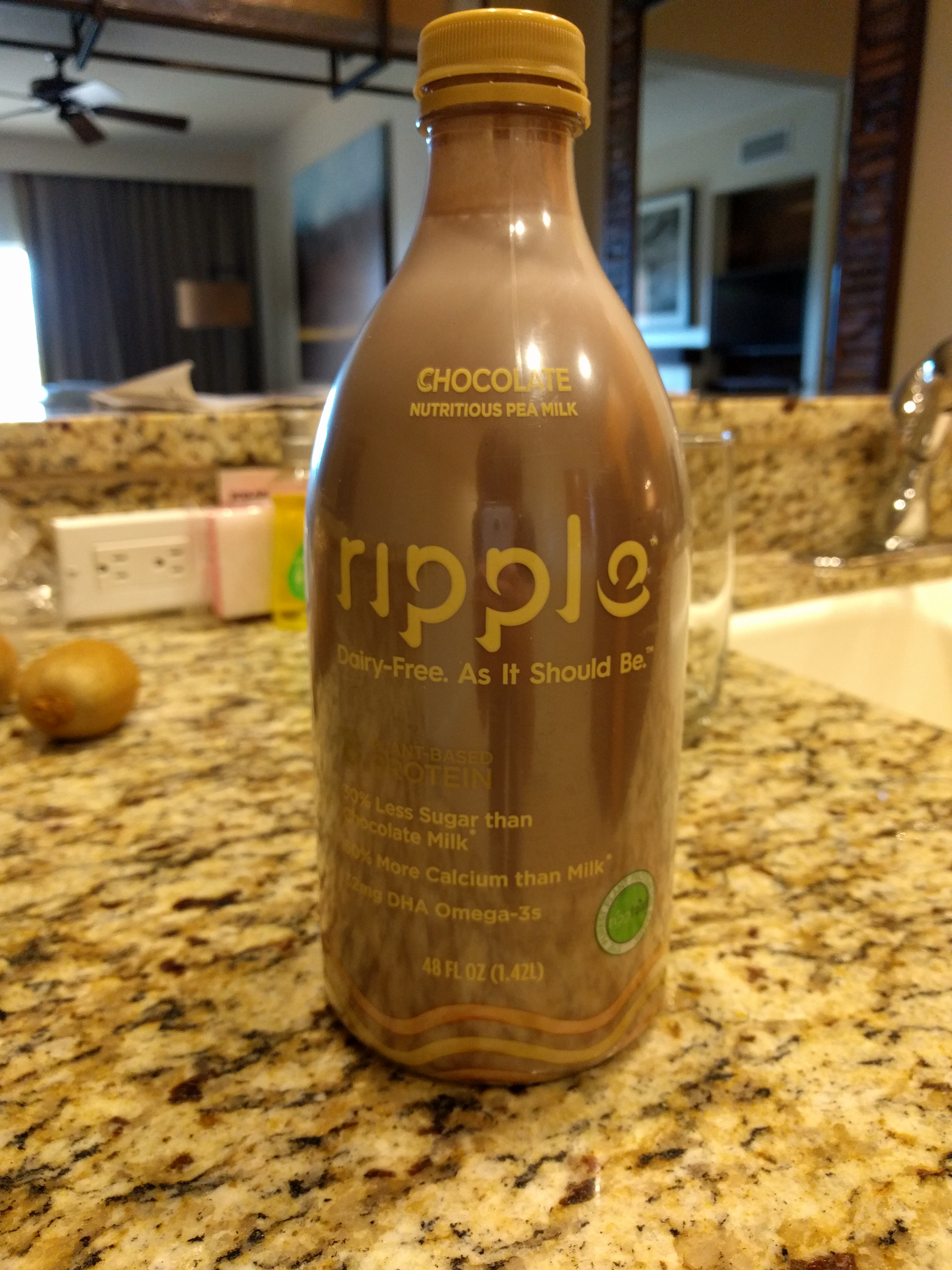
- Ripple's chocolate pea milk
- Company type: Private
- Industry: Dairy alternatives
- Founded: 2014
- Founders: Adam Lowry; Neil Renninger
- Headquarters: Emeryville, California
- Areas served: Canada and the United States
- Products: Pea protein beverage, half & half, Greek-style yogurt
- Website: ripplefoods.com

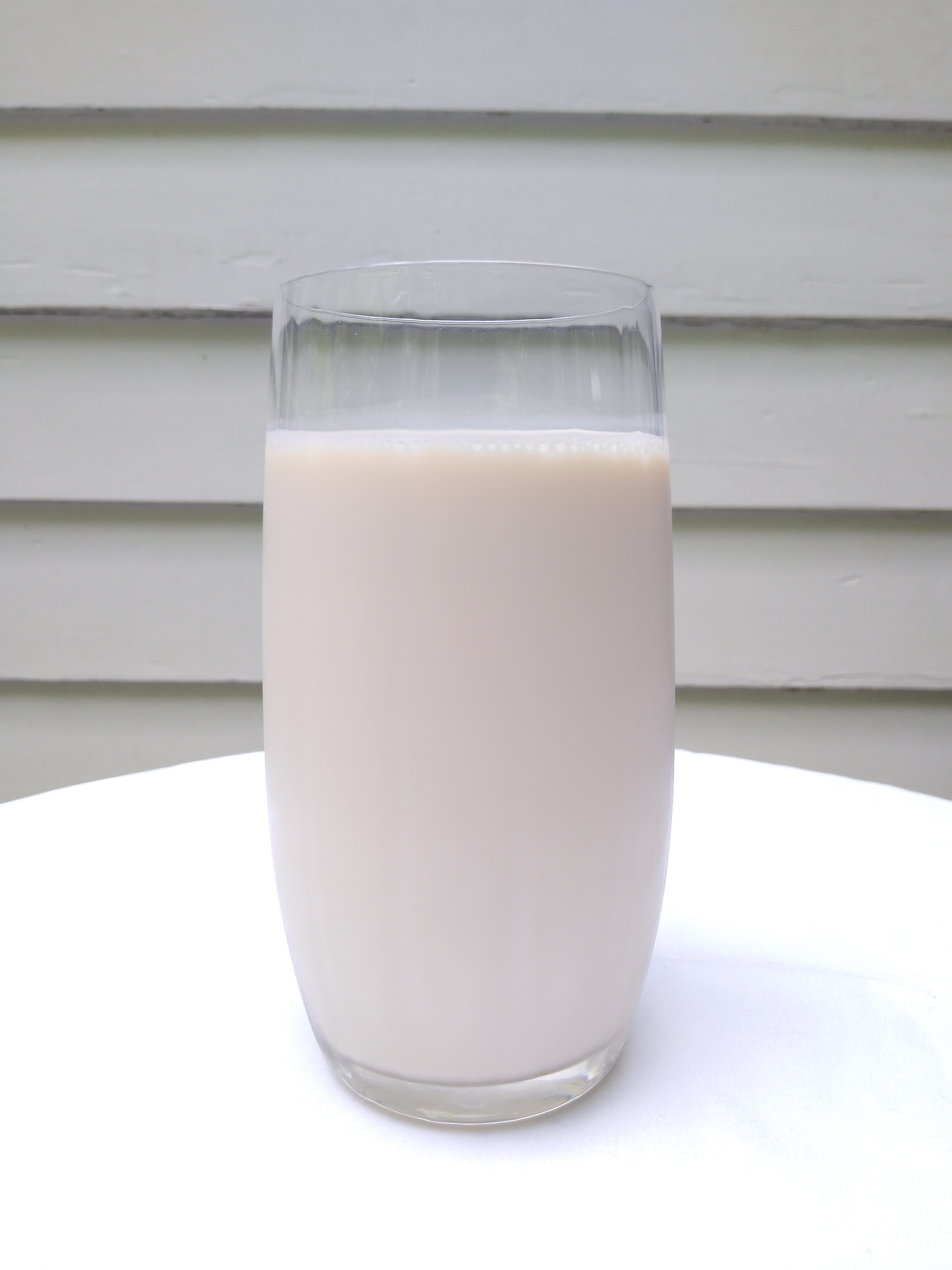
Ripple's original plant-based milk

Ripple Foods is a California-based brand of pea protein dairy alternative products. The company was founded in 2014 by Adam Lowry and Neil Renninger in Emeryville, California.

In 2017, Ripple Foods entered a deal with natural food distributor United Natural Foods to bring their pea protein beverage to the Canadian market.

== Products ==
At launch, the company sold original, vanilla, and chocolate pea protein beverage products at Whole Foods Market and Target stores in the United States. The product is made using water, pea protein from powdered yellow peas, cane sugar, sunflower oil, vitamins, preservatives, sea salt, natural flavor and guar gum. The pea protein is separated from the plant's taste and color molecules. Single-serve bottles and kid's paper cartons were later introduced.

In July 2017, a pea protein half and half was released in original and vanilla.

A Greek-style yogurt launched in late 2017 and is available in five flavors.

Pea protein based ice cream and cheese products are planned for release in 2018, according to the company. Ripple's vegan ice cream received favorable score of 4/5 "Green Stars" for social and environmental impact.

== Funding ==
The company started with a $13.6M series A round in order to help fund research and development.

In July 2016, Ripple Foods raised a $30M series B funding round, led by GV.

In early 2018, the company raised a $65 million series C funding round.
