= Brave Robot =

American vegan ice cream brand

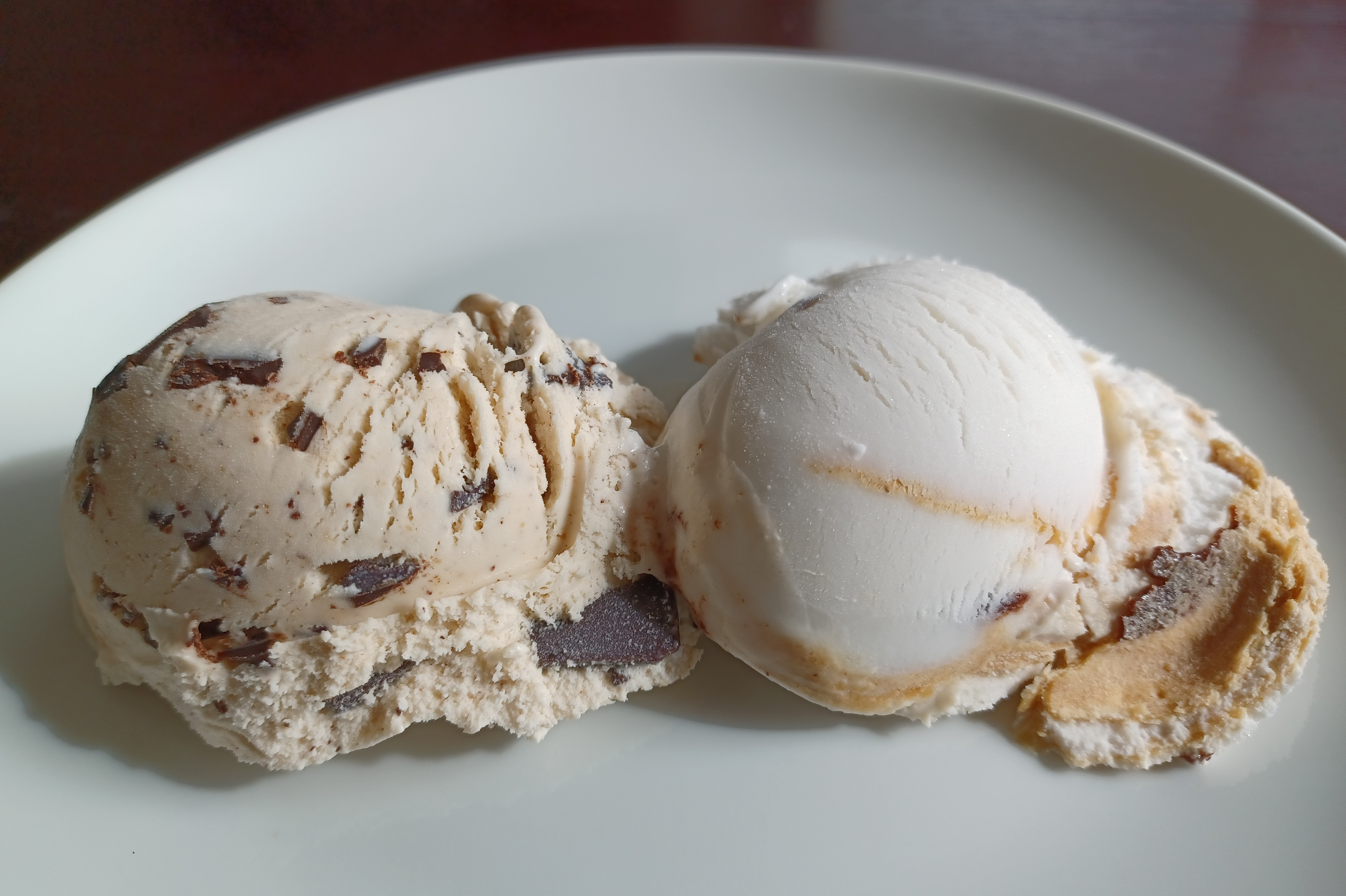
- Two flavors of Brave Robot ice cream
- Product type: Frozen dessert
- Current owner: Urgent Company
- Country: United States of America
- Introduced: June 2020; 6 years ago
- Tagline: Animal-Free Ice Cream
- Website: web.archive.org/web/20230929161833/https://braverobot.co/

Brave Robot was a brand of vegan ice cream made using Perfect Day's synthesized milk proteins. It had no lactose, but does include yeast-produced molecules reproducing those found in milk.

The ice cream came in 8 flavors: Raspberry White Truffle, Blueberry Pie, A Lot of Chocolate, Peanut Butter 'n Fudge, Hazelnut Chocolate Chunk, Buttery Pecan, Vanilla 'n Cookies, and Vanilla.

By the end of 2021, the company had sold one million pints of ice-cream. By 2022 the product was available in 8000 stores across the USA.

In 2023, the company's parent group, The Urgent Company, was bought by Superlatus; Superlatus had announced plans for Brave Robot to launch a line of pulse protein snacks in 2024.

As of 2024, the brand was defunct.

== See also ==
- Coolhaus
