= List of meat substitutes =

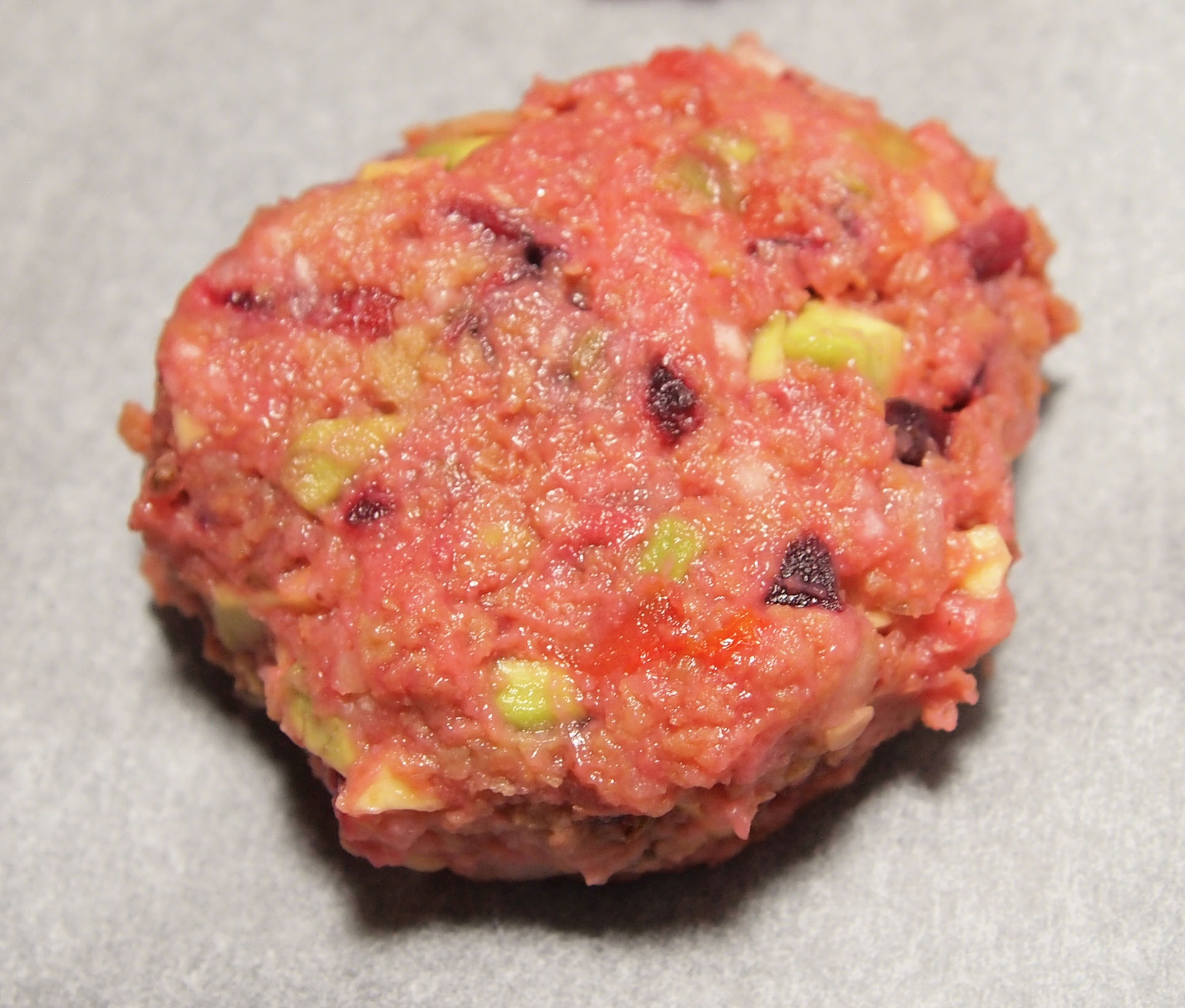
A vegetarian patty prepared from crushed soybean, avocado, tomato and beetroot

A meat substitute, also called a meat analogue, approximates certain aesthetic qualities (primarily texture, flavor and appearance) or chemical characteristics of a specific meat. Substitutes are often based on soybeans (such as tofu and tempeh), gluten, or peas. Whole legumes are often used as a protein source in vegetarian dishes, but are not listed here.

== General ==
- Vegetarian bacon – sometimes made from tempeh.
- Vegetarian sausage
  - Vegetarian hot dog
    - Carrot hot dog
- Vegetarian burger
- Vegan chicken nuggets – made from pea protein, soy protein, textured vegetable protein, and wheat gluten
- Tofurkey – faux turkey, a meat substitute in the form of a loaf or casserole of vegetarian protein, usually made from tofu (soybean protein) or seitan (wheat protein) with a stuffing made from grains or bread, flavored with a broth and seasoned with herbs and spices
- Cauliflower – coated in flour and baked or fried to imitate chicken wings or steak
- Leaf protein concentrate
- Meat extender – sometimes but not always soy-based
- Mock duck
- Nut roast
- Seitan – a food made from wheat gluten, with wheat being a grain.
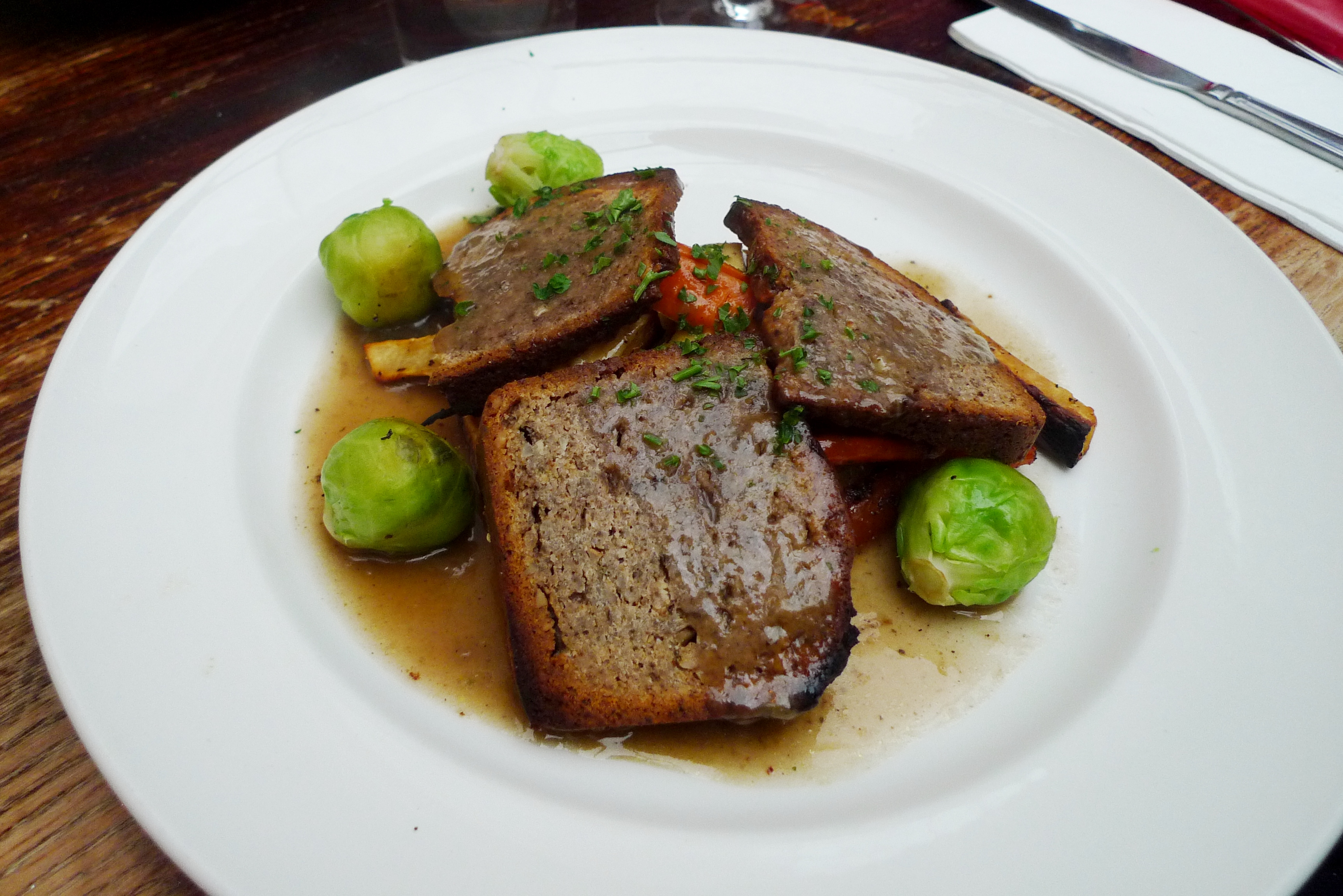
Sliced nut roast with brussels sprouts

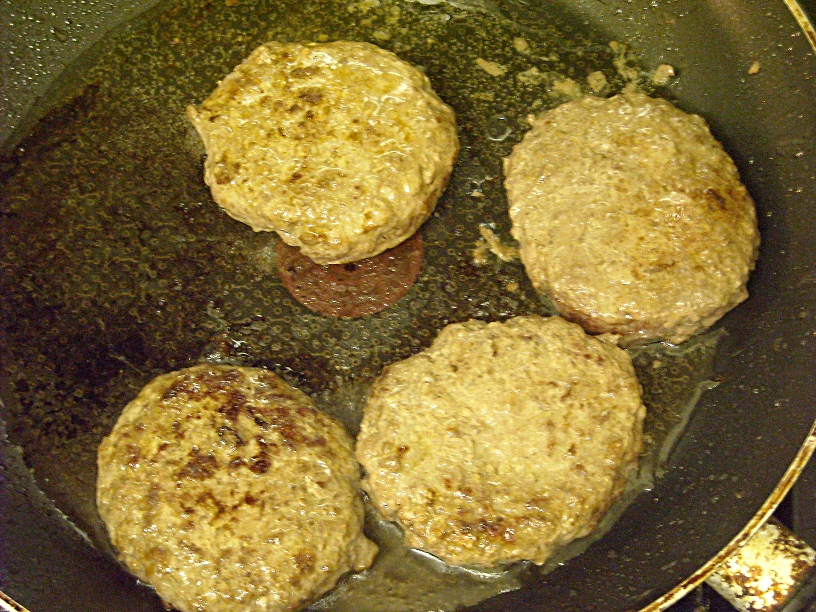
Veggie burgers prepared from beans being cooked

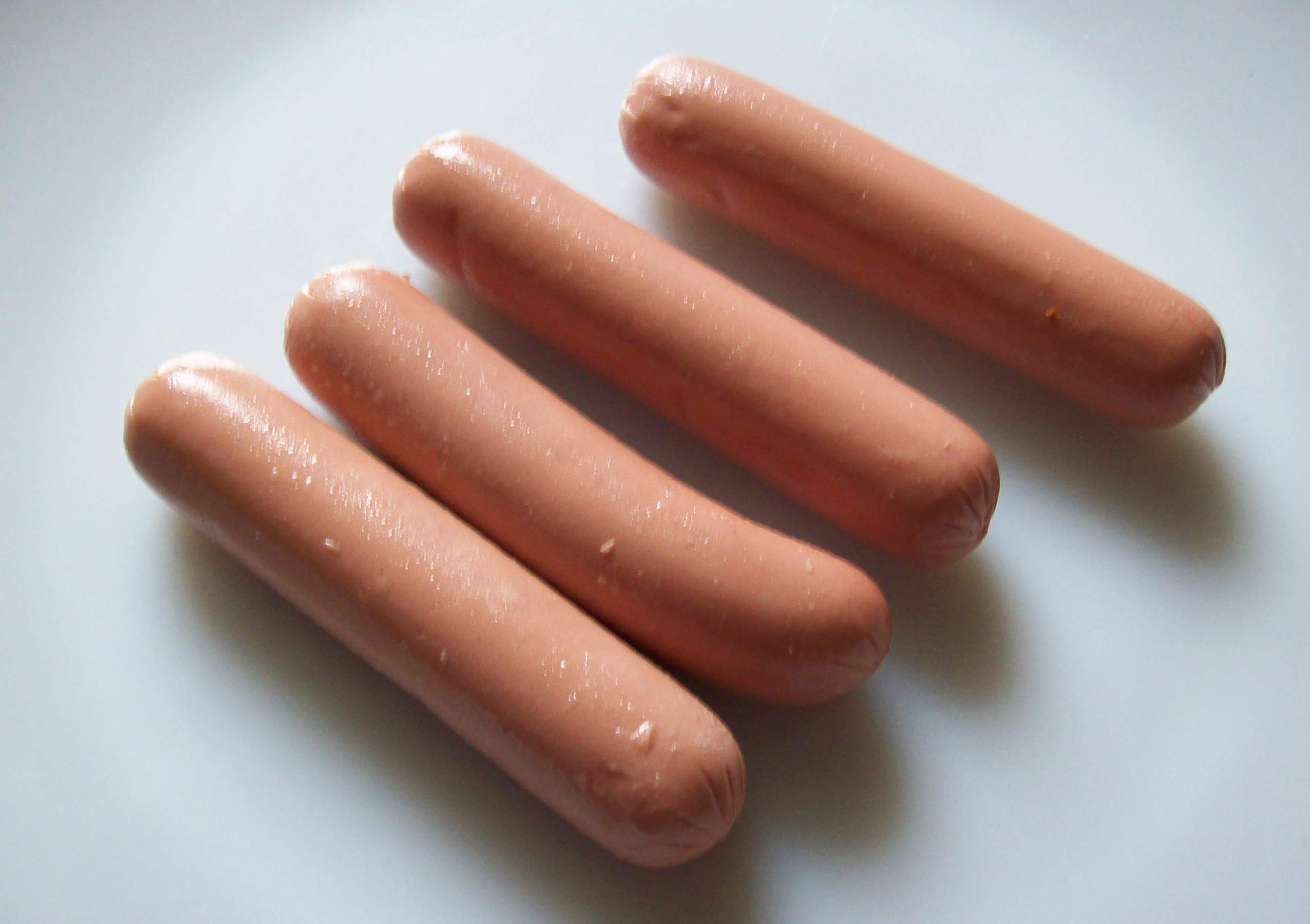
Vegetarian hot dog sausages from Germany

== Dairy-based ==
- Halloumi – a goat cheese originating from Cyprus.

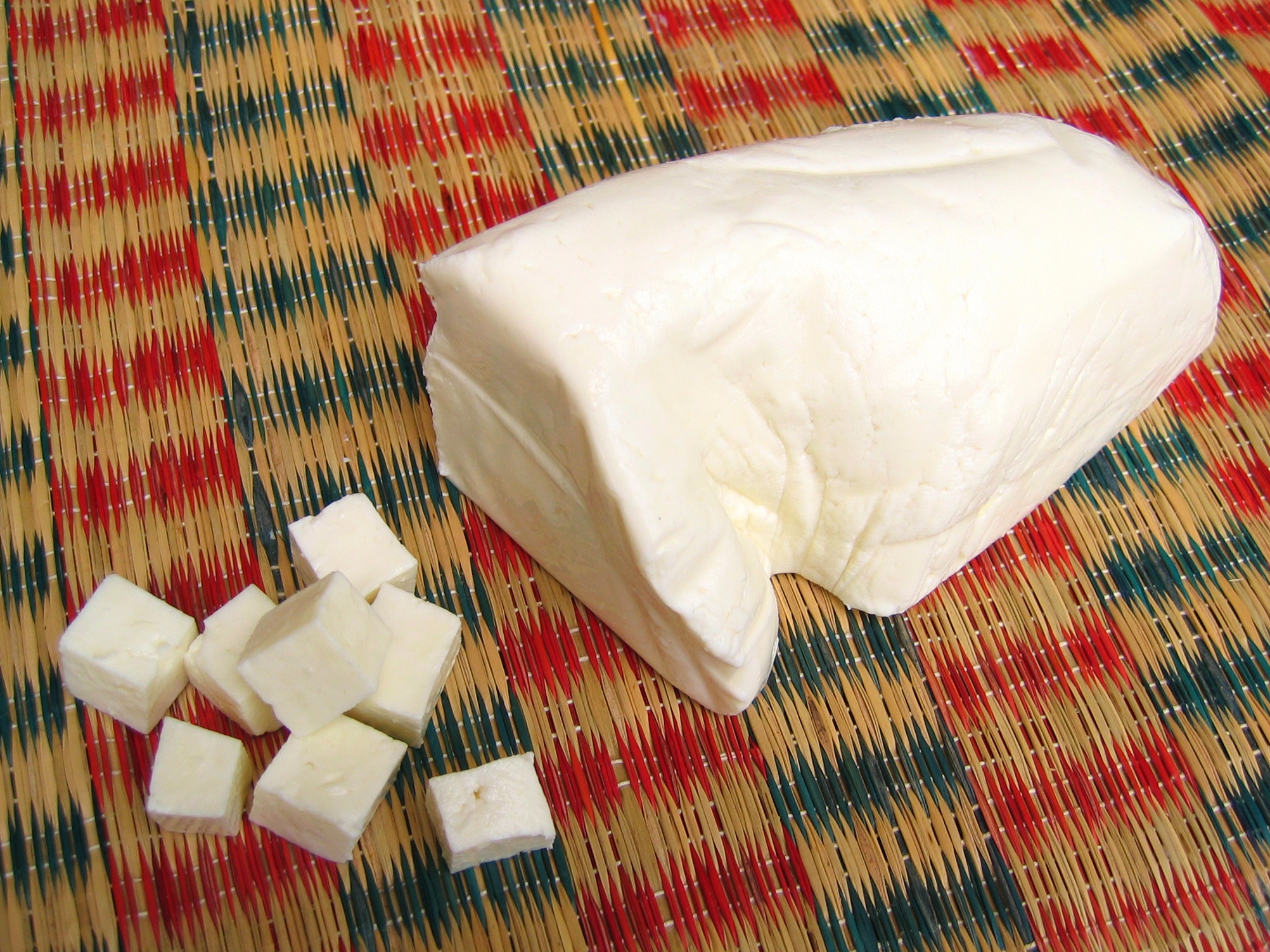
Paneer cheese produced in India

- Glamorgan sausage – a traditional Welsh vegetarian sausage named after the historic county of Glamorgan in Wales.
- Paneer – for example in such dishes as Paneer tikka

== Fungus-derived ==
- Edible mushrooms
- Mycoprotein – a form of single-cell protein, also known as fungal protein, it is able to provide greater satiety than traditional protein sources such as chicken, while also being rich in protein and low in caloric content
- Fistulina hepatica – a common mushroom known as beefsteak fungus
- Fusarium venenatum – a microfungus of the genus Fusarium that has a high protein content
- Hericium erinaceus – also known as lion's mane mushroom and has been explored as a steak alternative
- Laetiporus – a mushroom which is also named chicken of the woods
- Lyophyllum decastes – a mushroom known as fried chicken mushroom
- Neurospora crassa – a type of red bread mold of the phylum Ascomycota
- Pleurotus ostreatus – better known as the oyster mushroom, famous in the vegan community as one of the best substitutes for fried chicken

== Fruit-based ==
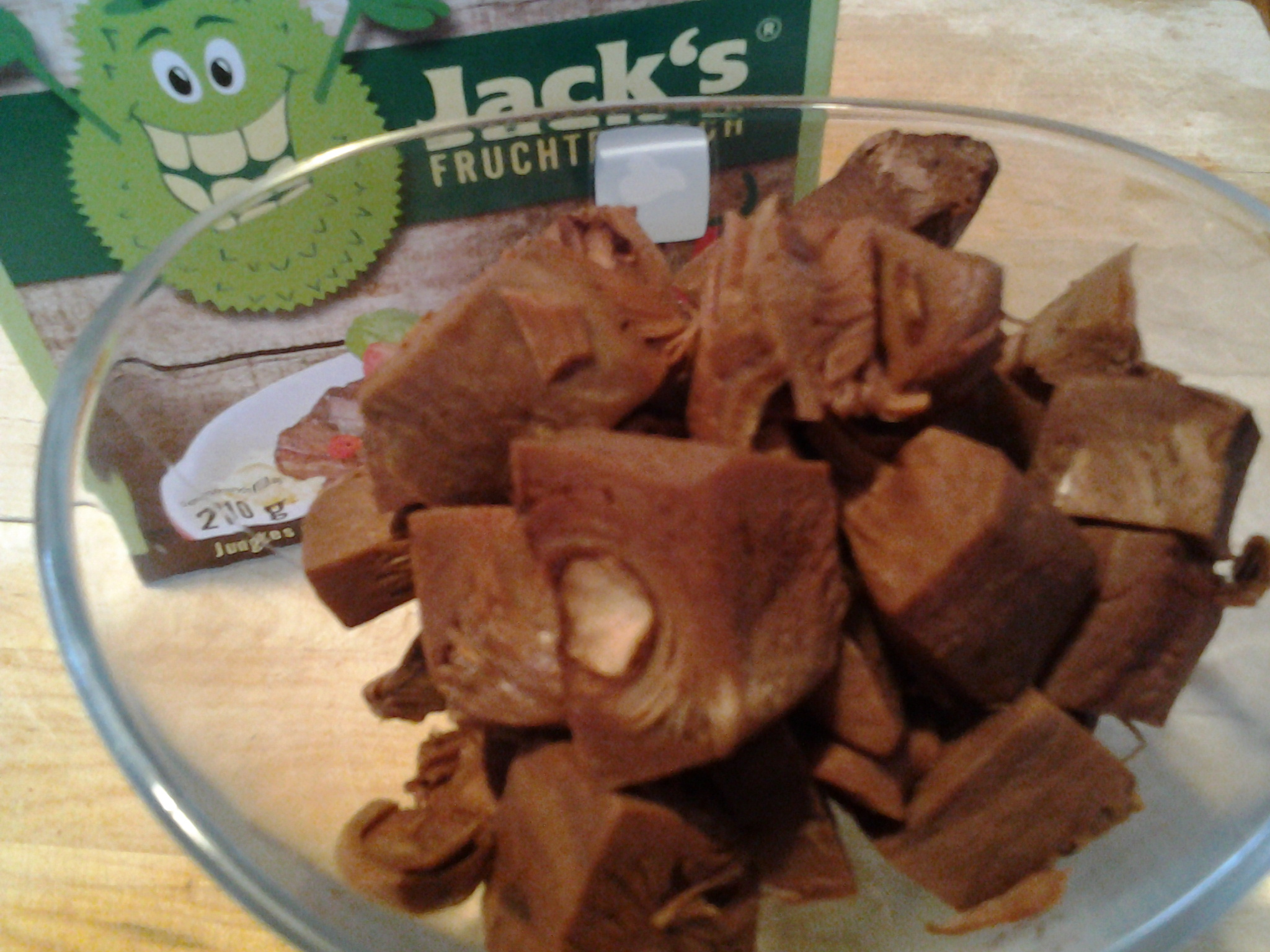
Cubes of young green jackfruit pulp sold as a meat substitute

- Breadfruit – used similarly as jackfruit in savory dishes
- Coconut burger – made from sapal, the coconut pulp by-products of traditional coconut milk extraction in Filipino cuisine
- Eggplant – semitropical/tropical plant with a highly textured flesh
- Grapefruit – during the course of the Special Period economic crisis Cubans prepared steaks made out of breaded and fried grapefruit rind known as "bistec de toronja".
- Jackfruit – a fruit whose flesh has a similar texture to pulled pork when cooked

== Legume-based ==
- Burmese tofu – made from water, chickpea flour and turmeric
- Falafel – a traditional Middle Eastern bean fritter, believed to have been created by ancient Copts as a meat substitute during Lent
- Härkis – a brand of processed ground fava beans

=== Soy-based ===
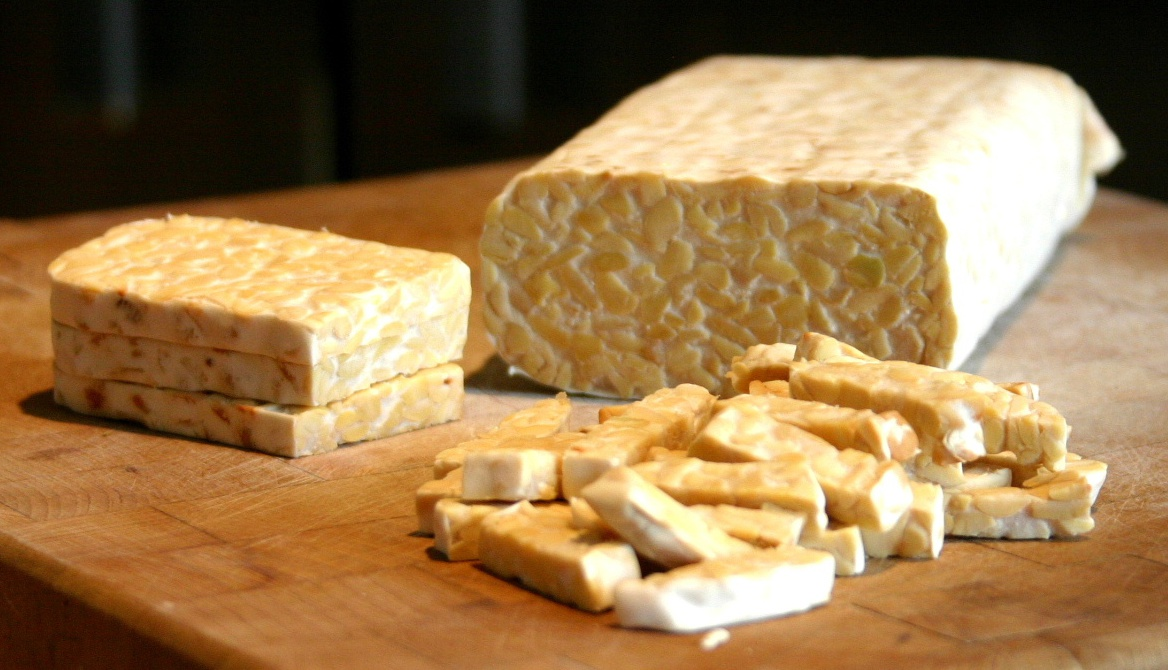
Tempeh

- Tofu, made from soy/soybeans.
- Textured vegetable protein – a defatted soy flour product that is a by-product of extracting soybean oil. It is often used as a meat analogue or meat extender. It is quick to cook, with a protein content that is comparable to certain meats.
- Ganmodoki – a traditional Japanese tofu based dish similar to veggie burgers
- Tempeh – a traditional Indonesian soy product in a cake form, made from fermented soybeans

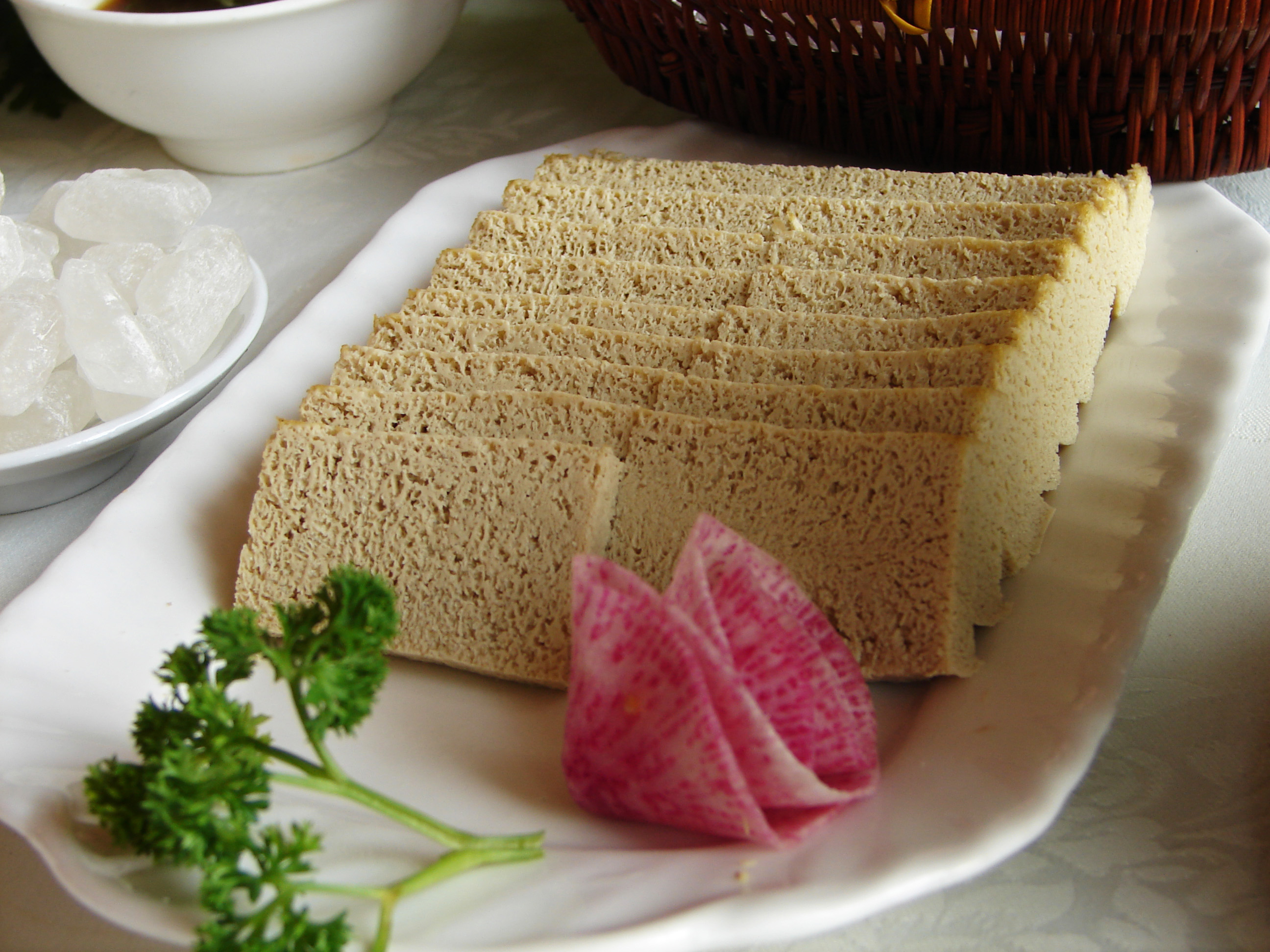
Tofu

- Injo-gogi-bap – a Korean steamed rice wrapped in leftover soybean paste and dressed with a chili sauce.
- Oncom – one of the traditional staple foods of West Java (Sundanese) cuisine of Indonesia, there are two types: red oncom and black oncom. Oncom is closely related to tempeh; both are foods fermented using mold.
- Koya dofu – a freeze-dried tofu that has a taste and texture similar to meat when prepared, common in Buddhist vegetarian cuisine

== See also ==
- Cheese analogue
- Cultured meat
- List of bacon substitutes
- List of vegetarian and vegan companies
- Veganism
- Vegetarian food
