= Nut roast =

Vegetarian dish

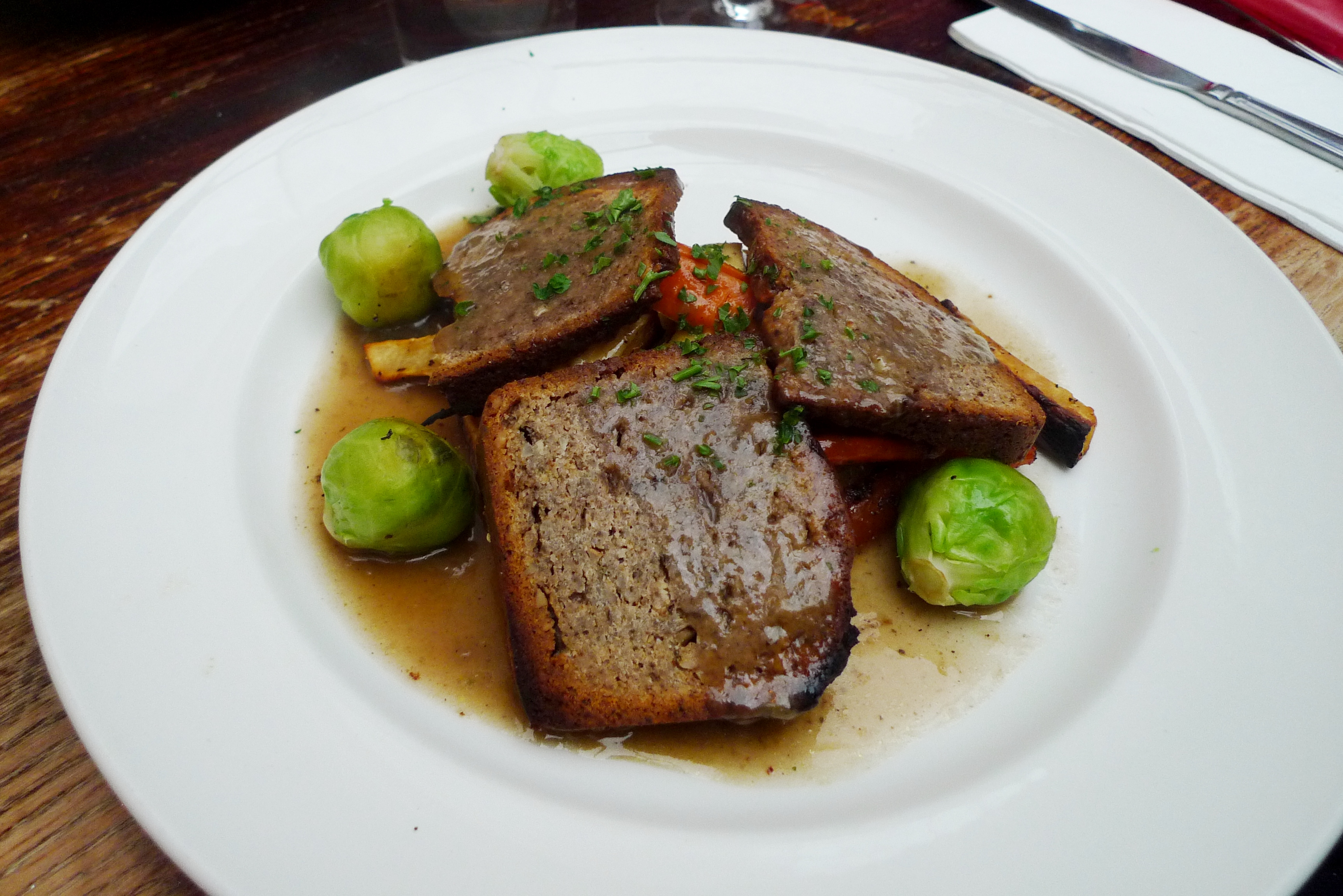
Sliced nut roast with Brussels sprouts

A nut roast or roasted nut loaf is a vegetarian dish consisting of nuts, grains, vegetable oils, broth or butter, and seasonings formed into a firm loaf shape or long casserole dish before roasting and often eaten as an alternative to a traditional British style roast dinner. It is popular with vegetarians at Christmas, as well as part of a traditional Sunday roast. Nut roasts are also made by Canadian and American vegetarians and vegans as the main dish for Thanksgiving or other harvest festival meals.

== History ==
The earliest known nut roast recipes emerged in the early 20th century, influenced by the vegetarian movement, health reformers, and concerns over food shortages. Almeda Lambert's Guide for Nut Cookery, published in 1899, contained a recipe for a vegetable nut roast. E. G. Fulton's 1904 Vegetarian Cook Book: Substitutes for Flesh Foods contained two nut roast recipes; the book emphasizes nuts as primary meat substitutes due to the prevalence of disease among animals. Florence A. George's 1908 cookbook Vegetarian Cookery contains two nut cutlet recipes. Emarel Freshel's Golden Rule Cookbook (1910) featured a Michaelmas Loaf, a nut roast that was moulded, placed in a roasting dish, and basted rather than baked in a tin.

Meanwhile, at the Battle Creek Sanitarium in Michigan, John Harvey Kellogg was developing nut-based roasts and cutlets, believing nuts to be the future of food sustainability. His work helped popularize nut-based meat alternatives, particularly among the health-conscious elite.

The influential London vegetarian restaurant Cranks opened in 1961, and its best-known dish was its nut roast. The Cranks nut roast inspired nut roasts eaten decades later. By 2025, numerous British supermarkets, including Waitrose, M&S, Morrisons, and Aldi, were offering nut roasts as part of their Christmas ranges.

== Ingredients ==
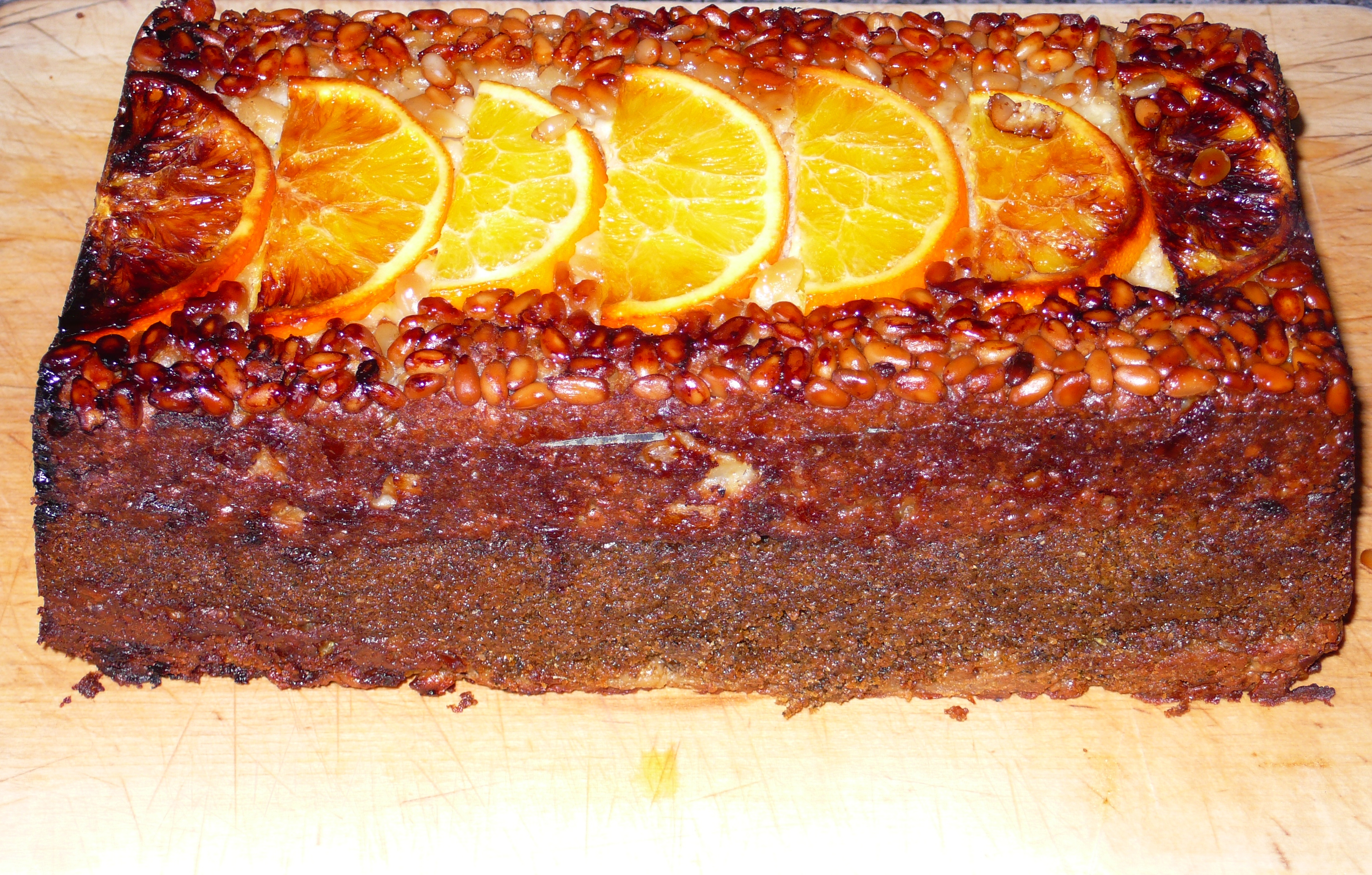
Unsliced nut roast

Nut roasts are commonly made with any single type or complementary combination of nuts and legumes desired such as walnuts, hazelnuts, Brazil nuts, pecans, cashew nuts, pistachios, chestnuts, sunflower seeds and peanuts and even lentils. The nuts may be whole, chopped up, or ground and are typically combined with one or several starches such as breadcrumbs or day-old bread, cooked rice, buckwheat kasha, groats, barley, rye or millet. The nuts and the starches are bound together with aromatics such as onions, garlic, or leeks, with fresh vegetable broth or bouillon cubes used and olive oil or butter. Seasoning is provided by complementary herbs of the cook's choosing. Sautéed mushrooms or truffle shavings or flavored oil, or tomatoes or cheese may be added for extra flavour and variety of texture. Vegemite, Marmite, or soy sauce is sometimes used as one of the stocks or what the onions are fried in. Some recipes call for a chicken's egg to bind the ingredients together.

The whole mixture is roasted or baked in a loaf pan or other baking dish until firm or a crust forms, and then served with side dishes. Whole nuts may be used as a garnish or decoration for the completed roast.

=== Recipes ===
The famous Cranks nut roast ingredients were one onion, butter or margarine, nuts, wholemeal bread, vegetable stock or water, yeast extract, mixed herbs, salt and pepper. Chef Mary Berry's nut roast recipe contains aubergine, Cheddar, and chestnuts. Jamie Oliver's Christmas Cookbook, written by chef Jamie Oliver, contains a nut roast recipe that contains squash, quinoa, chestnuts, and a spiced tomato sauce. Chef Justine Pattison's nut roast recipe contains mixed nuts, cashew butter, chestnuts, and cranberries.

Instant varieties are also available in the UK, Ireland, and other countries, where only added water is needed before baking in an oven.

== See also ==
- Groaty pudding
- Hotdish, a type of casserole from the American Midwest
- List of casserole dishes
- List of meat substitutes
- List of winter festivals
- Scrapple, leftovers with cornmeal and buckwheat formed into a loaf
- Stuffed peppers, a dish of deseeded peppers stuffed with savory mixtures and baked
- Tofurkey, loaves or casseroles made typically with soy or wheat protein
- Nuteena was a canned nut roast type product
- White pudding
