= El Nutri Taco =

Mexican restaurant in Portland, Oregon, U.S.

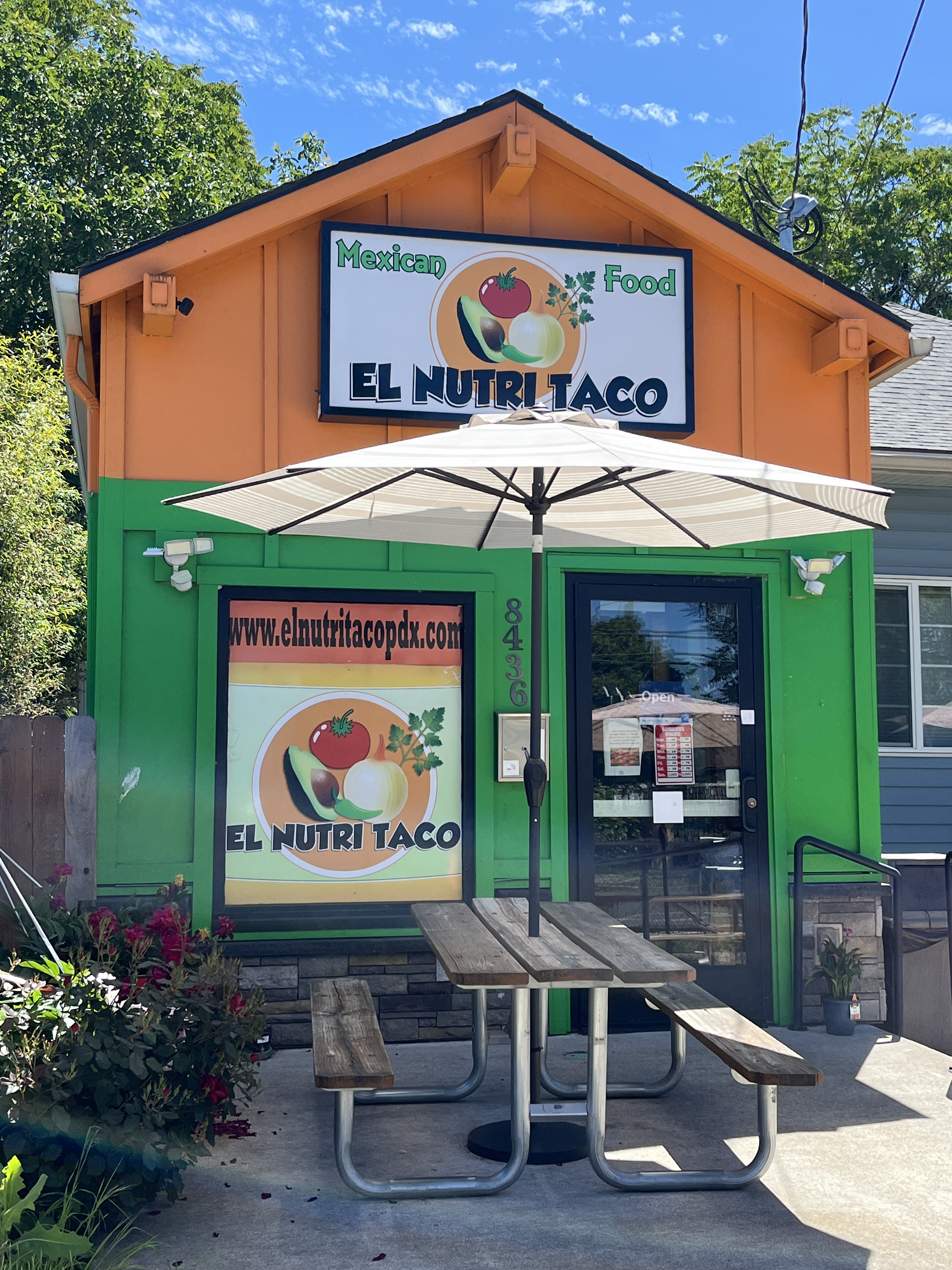
- Exterior of the restaurant in southeast Portland's Lents neighborhood, 2025

Restaurant information
- Food type: Mexican
- Location: Portland, Multnomah, Oregon, United States
- Website: elnutritacopdx.com

El Nutri Taco (sometimes El Nutri-Taco) is a restaurant with two brick and mortar locations in Portland, Oregon, United States. The family-owned business operates on Alberta Street in northeast Portland's Vernon neighborhood and on Woodstock Boulevard in southeast Portland's Lents neighborhood, serving Mexican cuisine with many gluten-free, vegetarian, and vegan options. The menu includes burritos, nachos, and tacos, with meats and alternatives such as soy curls, potato, and tempeh.

El Nutri Taco has also operated food carts. The business has garnered a positive reception and was named one of the 25 best vegan Mexican restaurants in the nation by VegNews in 2023.

== Description ==
The family-owned Mexican restaurant El Nutri Taco operates two brick and mortar locations in Portland, Oregon. One restaurant is on Alberta Street in northeast Portland's Vernon neighborhood and another is on Woodstock Boulevard in southeast Portland's Lents neighborhood. The restaurants have a "distinctive" green and orange exterior, according to Eater Portland. The business has also operated as food carts. When the two carts were in Lents and the Alberta Arts District, both had outdoor seating with picnic tables. According to The Oregonian, the Alberta cart was especially popular during Last Thursday and the Lents cart operated predominantly via take-out in the wintertime.

=== Menu ===
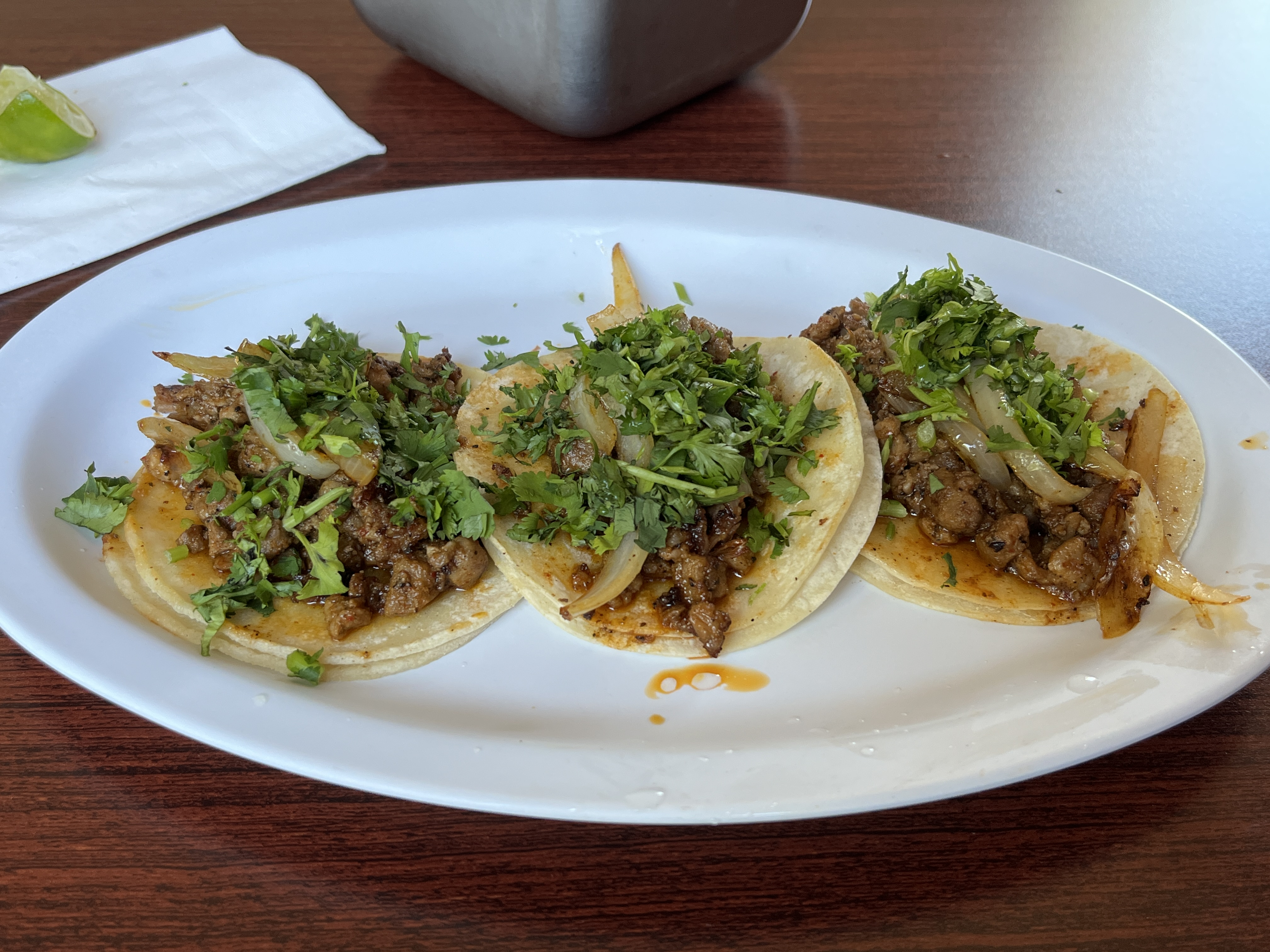
Tacos al pastor at El Nutri Taco in Lents in 2025

El Nutri Taco has many gluten-free, vegetarian, and vegan options. The menu includes burritos with ingredients such as aioli with chipotle, cabbage, jalapeños, salsa fresca, and zucchini. Among varieties of burritos is the Fantastico, which has a wheat tortilla, cactus, mushroom, onion, and rice, as well as black and pinto beans. The Volcano has chipotle soyrizo, rice, cheese, avocado, lettuce, onions, aioli, salsa fresca, and red hot sauce. A popular option is the wet burrito with enchilada sauce. One vegan option is the chile relleno burrito. Other vegan dishes use chipotle tempeh and soy curls as meat alternatives, Beyond Meat chicken, and baked potato, as well as soy-based cheese and sour cream.

The vegan nachos have tortilla chips, Daiya cheese, black beans, Tofutti sour cream, avocado, and salsa fresca, as well as pickled carrots and jalapeños. Entries with meat use beef, chicken, chorizo, pork, and beef tongue. Taco fillings include asada, carnitas, chicken, avocado, chorizo, eggs, potato, and tofu. El Nutri Taco has also served grilled cactus, chimichanga, tortas (including soyrizo and al pastor varieties), chips and salsa, Mexican sodas, and orange juice.

== History ==
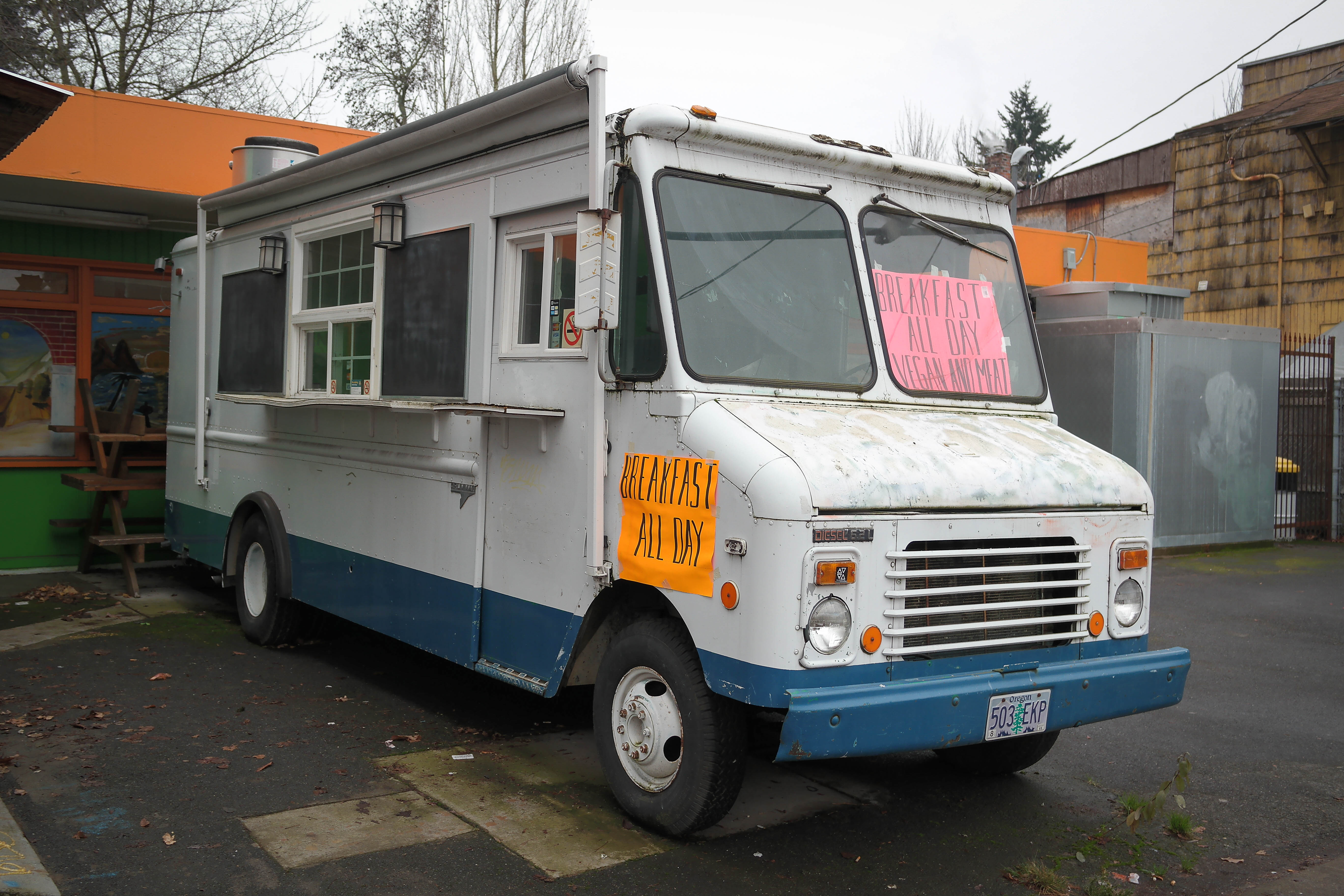
El Nutri Taco food cart in Portland, Oregon, 2013

As of 2012, El Nutri Taco operated as food carts in Lents and the Alberta Arts District.

== Reception ==
Willamette Week has said the chile relleno burrito "is not to be missed". Grant Butler ranked the vegan nachos eighth in The Oregonian's 2012 list of Portland's ten best vegan dishes. In 2016, Heather Arndt Andersen of the Portland Mercury gave El Nutri Taco honorable mention in an overview of her favorite tortas in the city. Portland Monthly included the business in a 2017 list of seventeen "standout vegan-approved" Portland restaurants. Sarah McLoughlin included the business in VegNews's 2023 list of the 25 best vegan Mexican restaurants in the nation. In Eater Portland's 2023 overview of recommended restaurants for vegan tacos, Waz Wu said El Nutri Taco is "a favorite among residents" of the Alberta and Woodstock neighborhoods. Lonely Planet has recommended the restaurant for dining in north and northeast Portland.

== See also ==
- Hispanics and Latinos in Portland, Oregon
- List of Mexican restaurants
- List of restaurant chains in the United States
- List of vegetarian and vegan restaurants
