= Artificial duck =

Artificial duck may refer to:

- Duck decoy (model), an object resembling a duck used in hunting to attract real ducks
- Mock duck, a gluten-based vegetarian food intended to appear and taste like duck meat
