= Hog's pudding =

Type of sausage

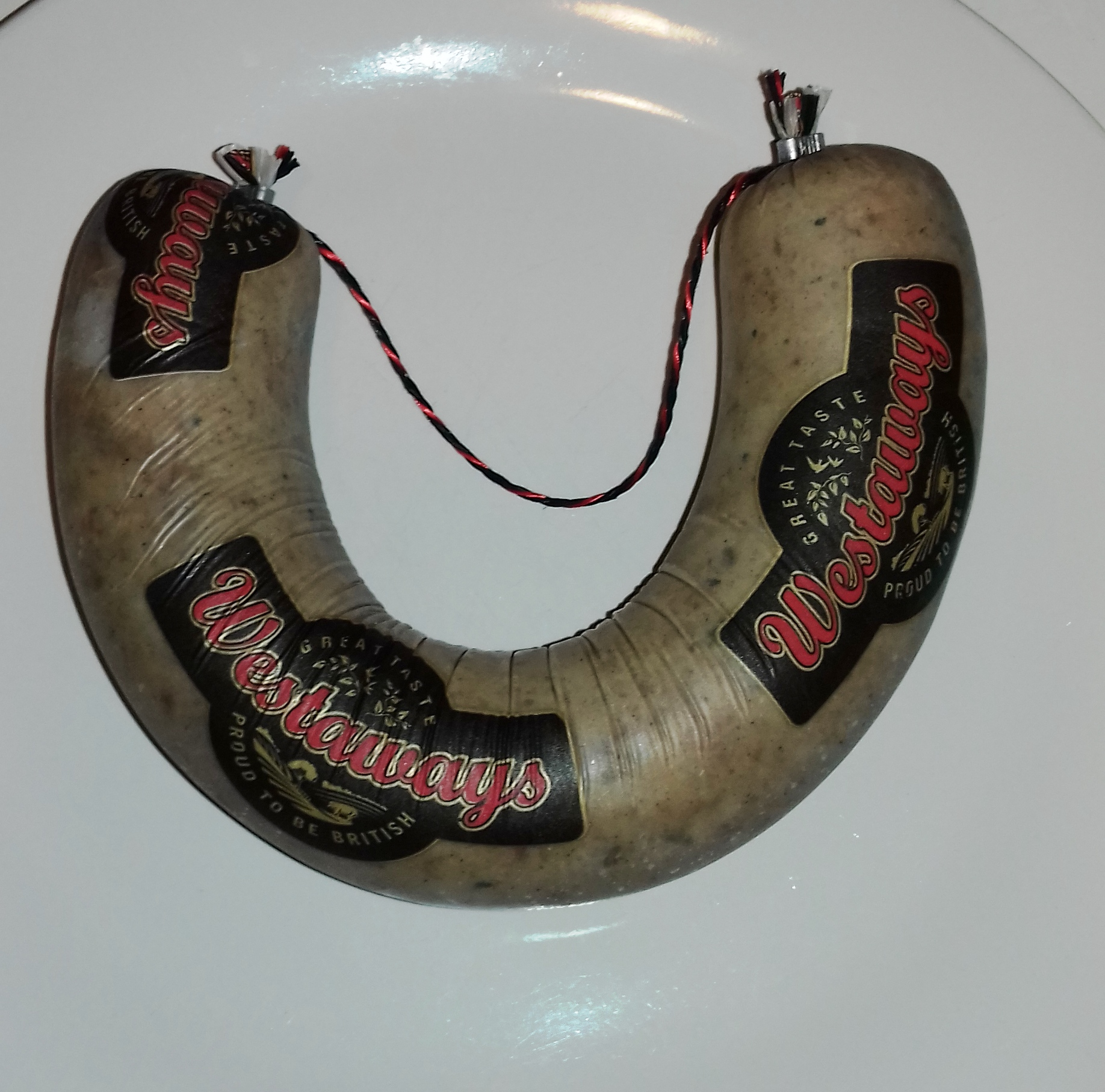
A whole, boiled, hog's pudding

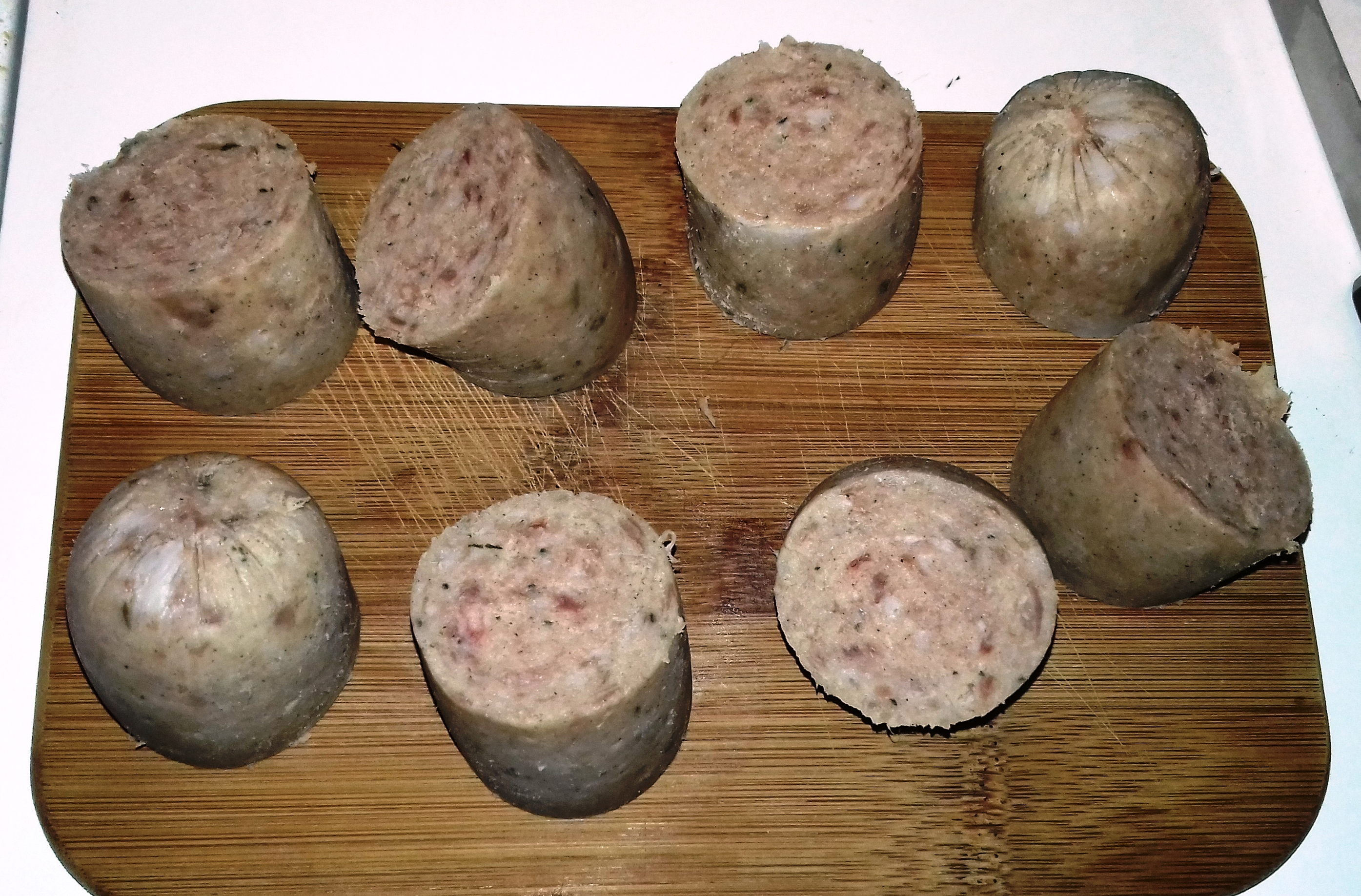
A hog's pudding, sliced and ready to fry

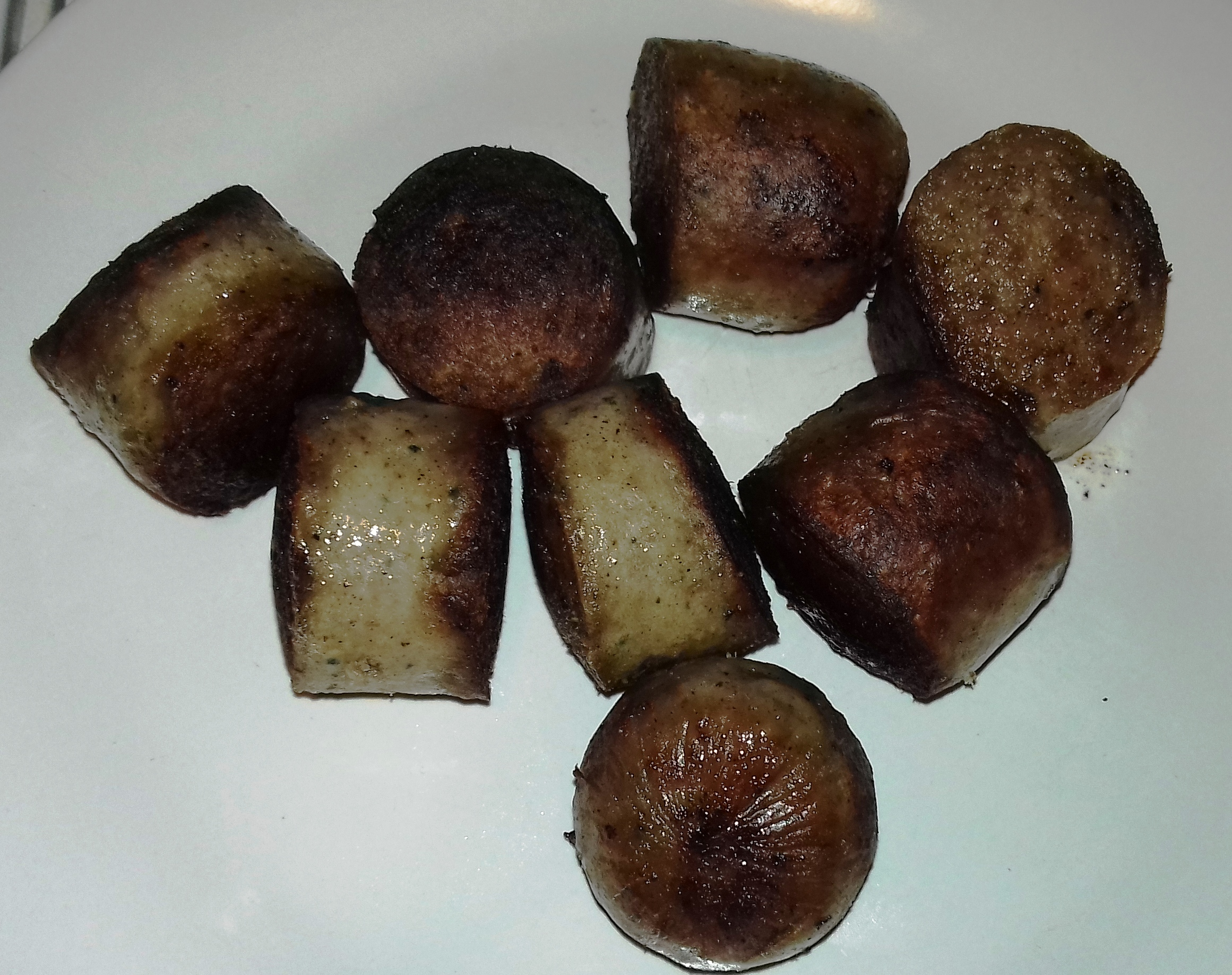
A hog's pudding, fried and ready to eat

Hog's pudding (Cornish: Gosogen) is a type of sausage traditionally associated with Cornwall. Popular variants of the recipe consist of pork meat and fat, suet, bread, as well as oatmeal or pearl barley formed into a large sausage—also known as 'groats pudding' and are very similar to a white pudding, whereas other versions of the recipe contain a high percentage of offal such as lung and liver and can more accurately be described as a sort of West Country haggis. It is much spicier than white pudding as it contains black pepper, cumin, basil and garlic. The sausage is usually around two inches in diameter.

== See also ==
- Black pudding
- Boudin
- Faggot
- Scrapple
