= Härkis =

Processed fava beans brand name

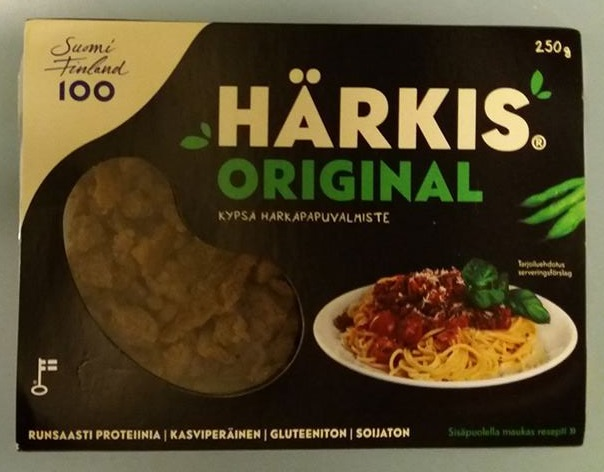
A box of Härkis Original

Härkis is the brand name of processed fava beans by the Finnish company Verso Food.

Härkis is a vegetable protein product, whose product consists of Finnish fava beans and pea protein. Härkis is ready to eat out of the box, and it can be used in cooking in place of minced meat or textured vegetable protein.

The name "Härkis" is a colloquial form of the word härkäpapu (literally "bull bean"), Finnish for "fava bean".

== History ==
Härkis appeared on the market in September 2016. As the popularity of vegetable protein products increased, Härkis started appearing in many restaurants as well as grocery stores.

"More and more consumers want to avoid the use of red meat, but many of us don't want to switch to foreign soy. For this end we started to develop an ecological domestic alternative. The solution was found in domestic fava beans." - Tarja Ollila, CEO of Verso Food

In late January 2017, two ready-seasoned version of Härkis and three kinds of Härkis steak appeared on the market.

In late March 2019 Härkis expanded on the Japanese market. Three Härkis products were launched in Japan: Härkis Plain (Härkis Original), Härkis Mexican (Härkis Tex Mex) and Härkis Ethnic Curry, which had been developed specifically for the Japanese market. Four hundred stores in Tokyo, Osaka and Nagoya started selling Härkis products.

In March 2019, the Norwegian company Kavli announced it would be acquiring Verso Food, the producer of Härkis. In 2019, a new Härkis factory was opened in Kauhava.

In summer 2019, Verso Food launched a new striped fava bean product under the Beanit brand. The product comes in three flavours: plain, lemon and garlic with herbs. The bean stripes are made of ground beans. Other Härkis products are ground from whole fava beans.

The food industry corporation Raisio Oyj acquired Verso Food from Kavli in spring 2021.

== Competing products ==
In the late 2010s, other vegetable and insect protein products have appeared on the Finnish market to serve as replacements for minced meat, such as Nyhtökaura from Gold & Green Foods, Elovena Muru kaurajauhis from Raisio and Sirkkis from Entomophagy Solutions Oy. Valio has also brought the milk protein product Mifu onto the market.

== See also ==
- Vegetarianism
- Veganism
- Seitan
- Tofu
- Quorn
