= Meat extender =

A meat extender is a non-meat substance with substantial protein content, used to partially replace meat in a meat product. Extenders are distinguished from fillers by their high protein content, compared to the high carbohydrate content of fillers.

Extenders were originally used to reduce costs, but they were later used to make meat products more healthy by adding plant protein, dietary fiber, or to improve the texture. Meat extenders were used in the United States in the 1940s, with rolled oats used as an extender in sausage meat, and dishes such as stuffed cabbage were considered to be a suitable way of extending meat.

By the 1970s, soy protein was commonly used as a meat extender. Textured vegetable protein, which was invented in the 1960s, has become a common extender in the 1990s.

== See also ==
- List of meat substitutes
- Fillers
- Meat analogue
