= Groaty pudding =

Traditional English food

- Alternative names: Groaty Dick
- Type: Pudding
- Place of origin: United Kingdom
- Region or state: Black Country
- Main ingredients: Groats, beef, leeks, onion, and beef stock

Groaty pudding (also known as groaty dick) is a traditional dish from the Black Country in England. It is made from soaked groats, beef, leeks, onion, and beef stock which are baked together at a moderate temperature of approximately 150 °C (302 °F) for up to 16 hours. In the Black Country it is traditional to eat groaty pudding on Guy Fawkes Night.

It is mentioned as a local staple by Samuel Jackson Pratt in 1805.

== See also ==
- Haggis
- Meatloaf
- Nut roast
- Red pudding
- Scrapple
- White pudding
