= E. G. Fulton =

Canadian-American businessperson and writer (1867–1949)

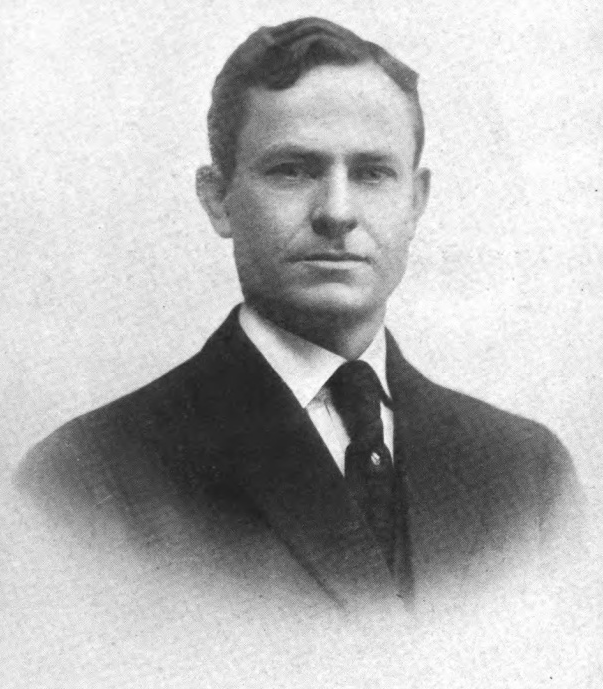
- Fulton, c. 1910
- Born: Edwin Giles Fulton; January 6, 1867; Nova Scotia, Canada
- Died: January 16, 1949 (aged 82); Vista, California, U.S.
- Resting place: Grand View Memorial Park Cemetery, Glendale, California
- Other name: Edward Guyles Fulton
- Citizenship: Canadian; American
- Occupations: Businessperson; writer
- Known for: Vegetarian businesses and cookbook
- Notable work: Vegetarian Cook Book: Substitutes for Flesh Foods (1904)
- Spouse: Nelly Coolidge (m. 1889)

Signature
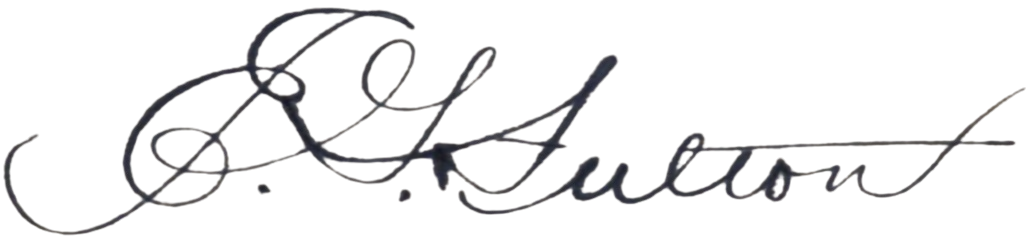

Edwin Giles Fulton (Note: His name is sometimes recorded as Edward Guyles Fulton. However, his legal name was Edwin Giles Fulton.) (January 6, 1867 – January 16, 1949) was a Canadian-American businessperson and cookbook writer. A Seventh-day Adventist, he wrote Vegetarian Cook Book: Substitutes for Flesh Foods (1904) and operated vegetarian restaurants, hospitals, and sanitariums in the United States.

== Biography ==
=== Early and personal life ===
Edwin Giles Fulton was born in Nova Scotia, Canada, on January 6, 1867. He came to the United States as a child. On December 20, 1889, while living in Oakland, California, he married Nelly Coolidge of Iowa.

=== Business and institutional management ===
Fulton operated vegetarian restaurants in several cities, including the Vegetarian Cafeteria in Los Angeles, which he operated for several years. He also managed several Seventh-day Adventist hospitals and sanitariums in Glendale, Washington, Washington, D.C., Boulder, Colorado, and other locations.

Fulton was a director of the Sanitarium Food Company, owned by the Seventh-day Adventist Church. In 1906, Fulton and H. H. Haynes took part in discussions about producing corn flakes for the Pacific Coast. They travelled to Battle Creek to propose that the Sanitarium Health Food Company oversee production. According to W. C. White, Fulton and Haynes were told that John Harvey Kellogg and W. K. Kellogg planned to establish an independent factory, separate from denominational food enterprises. They declined proposals for the St. Helena Sanitarium Food Company to produce corn flakes, citing concerns about the viability of denominational business ventures.

=== Vegetarian Cook Book ===
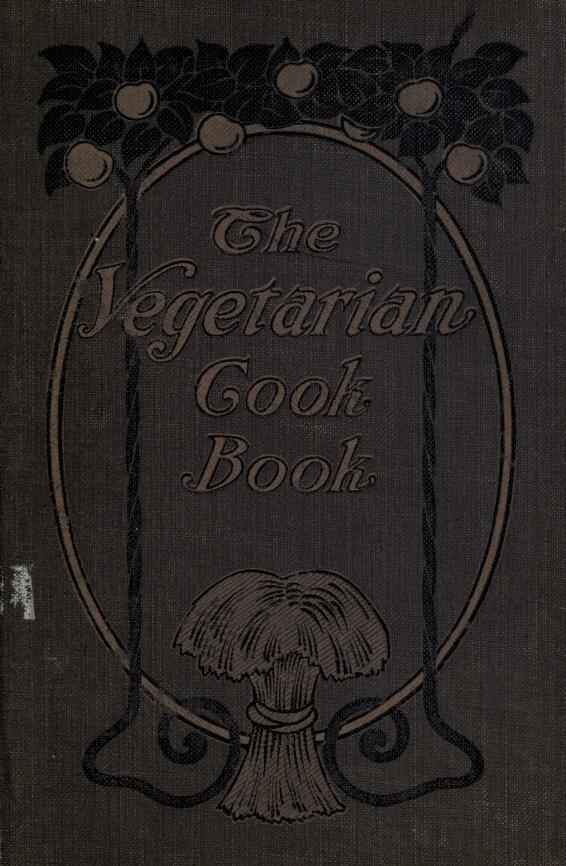
Cover of the Vegetarian Cook Book, 1904

In 1904, Fulton published Vegetarian Cook Book: Substitutes for Flesh Foods. (Note: Sometimes titled as Substitutes for Flesh Foods: Vegetarian Cook Book.) In the book, he wrote that "The prevalence of disease among animals is leading hundreds of men and women to avoid flesh foods and to turn to the more natural diet of nuts, grains, fruits and vegetables." Mairead DeRoy writes that the book presented vegetarian cookery through meat substitutes.

The cookbook included protose, a plant-based meat substitute made from wheat gluten, peanut butter, and cereal, which was marketed by John Harvey Kellogg. It also used nuts as meat alternatives and included two early nut roast recipes. Peanut butter appeared in many recipes.

A 1910 notice in The Boston Globe stated that Fulton's restaurants were attended by people interested in vegetarianism and that demand had led to an expanded edition of Vegetarian Cook Book, with additional recipes and instructions for preparing meat substitutes.

=== Death ===
Fulton retired around 1941 to Vista, California. He died at home there after a long illness on January 16, 1949, aged 82. On January 18, he was buried at Grand View Memorial Park Cemetery.

== Publications ==
- Vegetarian Cook Book: Substitutes for Flesh Foods (Oakland, California: Pacific Press Publishing Company, 1904)
