= Mock duck =

Meat substitute

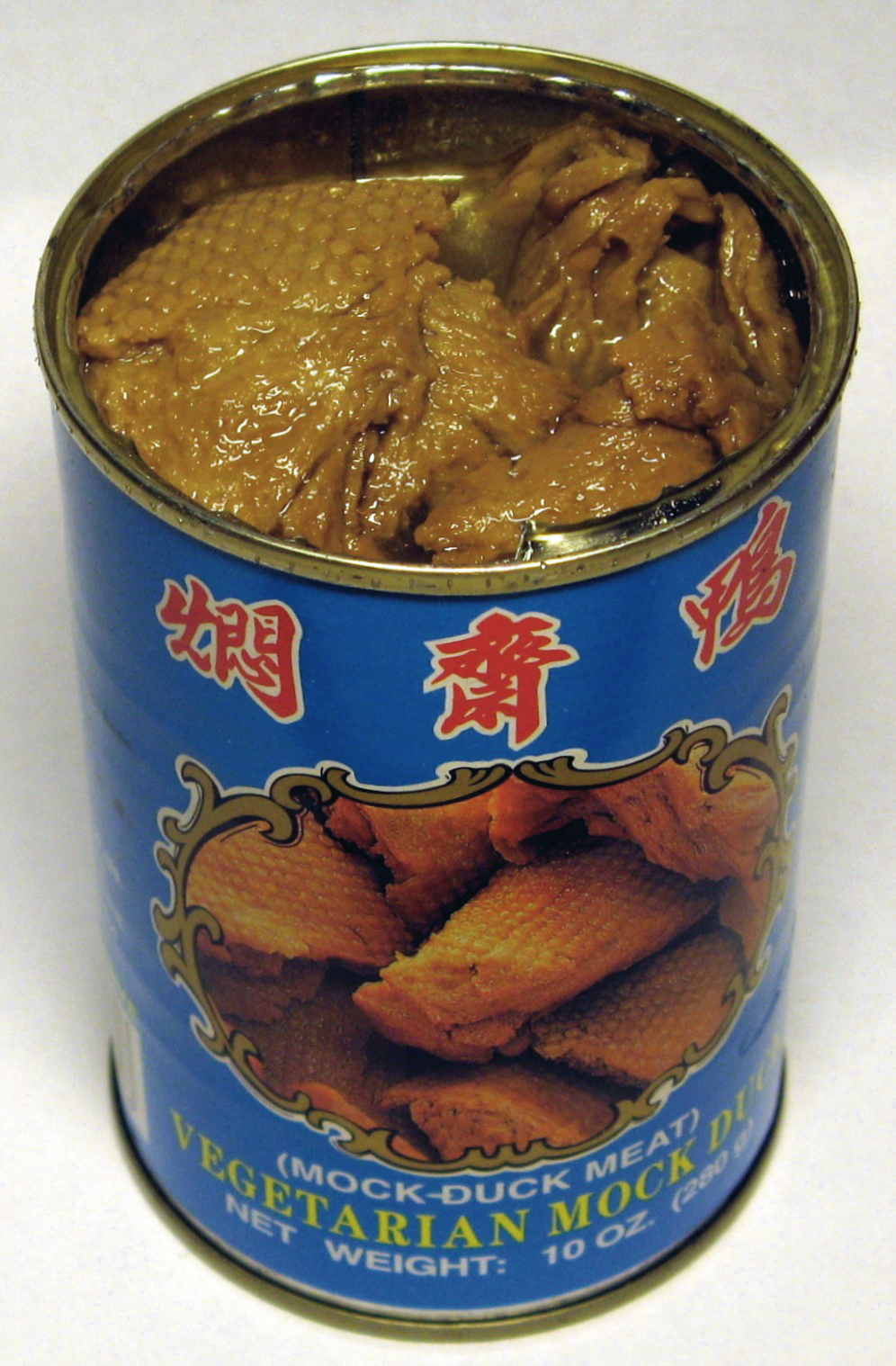
- Canned fried wheat gluten ("vegetarian mock duck")
- Traditional Chinese: 燜齋鴨
- Simplified Chinese: 焖斋鸭
Transcriptions
Standard Mandarin
- Hanyu Pinyin: mènzhāiyā)

Mock duck is a gluten-based meat substitute in Chinese cuisine. It is made of wheat gluten, oil, sugar, soy sauce, and salt, and is high in protein. Its distinctive flavor and artificial "plucked duck" texture distinguish it from other forms of commercially available gluten products.

Mock duck along with other wheat gluten meat substitutes has origins in the Chinese Buddhist cuisine, dating back to the Middle Ages. Mock duck can be found in some Chinese grocery stores or retail outlets providing international selections of food. It is most often sold canned. Similar products may be labeled as "Mock Abalone" or "Cha'i Pow Yu" (齋鮑魚; pinyin: zhāibàoyú).

Typically, mock duck gains its flavor from the stewing of the gluten product in soy sauce and MSG.

A variation of mock duck made from tofu skin is also popular, and is known as tofu duck.

== See also ==
- List of meat substitutes
