= Injo-gogi-bap =

North Korean meat substitute dish

- Hangul: 인조 고기 밥
- Hanja: 人造 고기 飯
- RR: injo gogi bap
- MR: injo kogi pap

Injo-gogi-bap (Korean: 인조 고기 밥; lit. 'rice with artificial meat') is a North Korean dish, made of rice, kimchi, soy bean paste and soy bean oil. It is made by wrapping steamed rice in a light skin made from leftover soybean paste and dressed with a chili sauce. This creates a meat-like texture.

Injo-gogi-bap was created during the North Korean famine, which lasted from 1994 to 1998.

== See also ==
- Crab stick
