= Groat (grain) =

Hulled kernels of various cereal grains

Groats
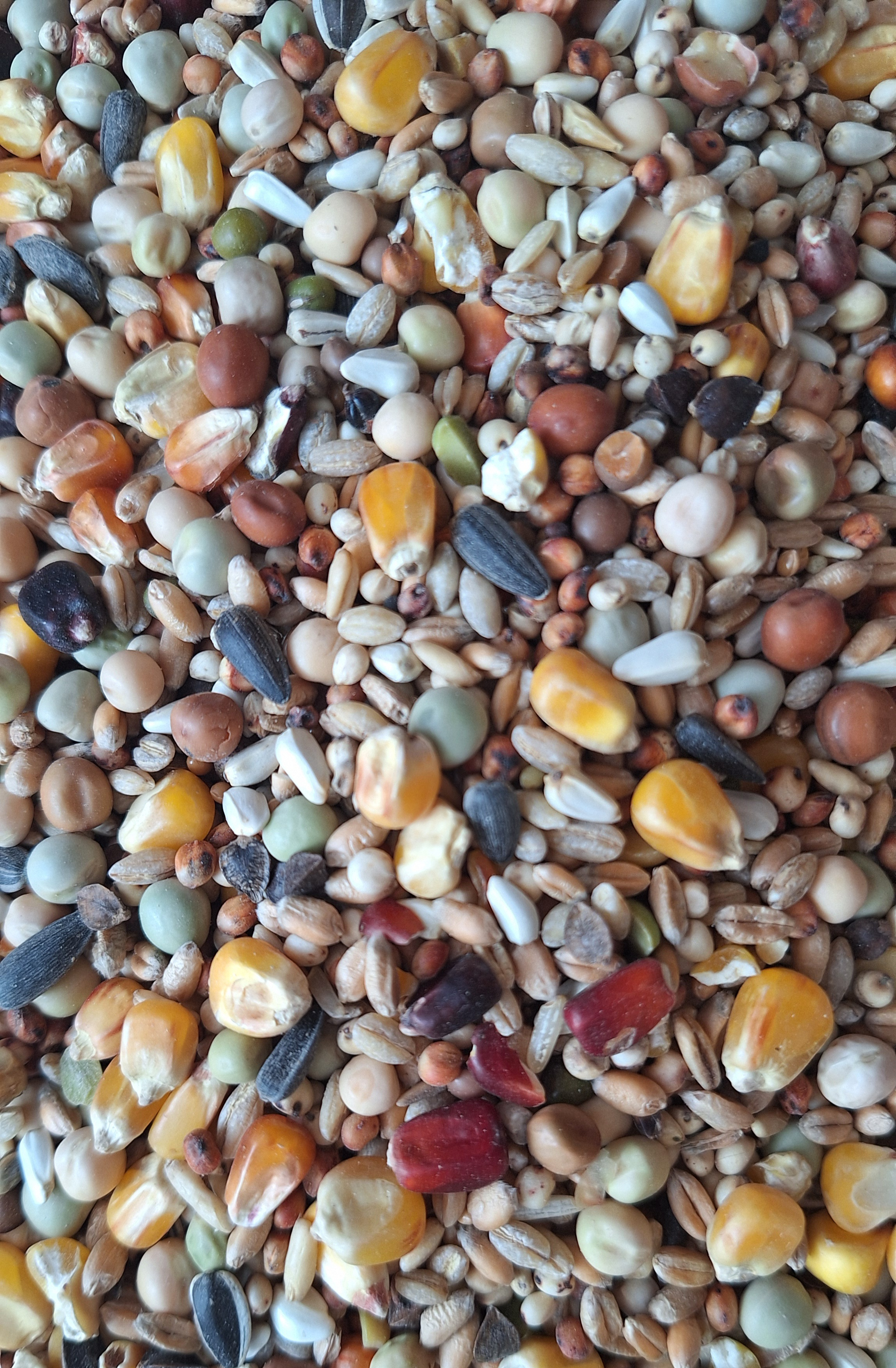
- Groats mix
- Type: Whole grain
- Main ingredients: any grains such as oats, wheat, barley, millet or rye etc.
- Variations: Bulgur

Groats (or in some cases, "berries") are the hulled kernels of various cereal grains, such as oats, wheat, rye, and barley. Groats are whole grains that include the cereal germ and fiber-rich bran portion of the grain, as well as the endosperm (which is the usual product of milling).

Groats can also be produced from pseudocereal seeds such as buckwheat.

== Culinary uses ==
Groats are nutritious but can be difficult to chew, so they are often soaked before cooking. Groats are used as the main ingredient in soup, porridge, bread, and vegetable-based milk.

Groats of many cereals are the basis of kasha, a porridge-like staple meal of Eastern Europe and Eurasia. In North America, kasha or kashi usually refers to roasted buckwheat groats in particular.

In North India, cut or coarsely ground wheat groats are known as dalia, and are commonly prepared with milk into a sweet porridge or with vegetables and spices into salty preparations.

In Yemen, boiled groats are eaten as a hot breakfast cereal, known as harish, and topped with clarified butter (samneh), or with honey. In Palestine and Syria, the same dish is known locally as ğarīš (Arabic: جَرِيش), which may also refer to the farinaceous dish of semolina.

Parboiled and cut durum wheat groats, known as bulgur, are an essential ingredient of many Middle Eastern dishes such as mansaf and tabbouleh.

Groats are also used in some sausages, such as black puddings. A traditional dish from the Black Country in England is called groaty pudding (not to be confused with groats pudding). Groaty pudding is made from soaked groats, leeks, onions, beef, and beef stock, baked for up to 16 hours. It is a traditional meal on Guy Fawkes Night.

Sliced oat groats are known as steel-cut oats, pinhead oats, coarse or Irish oatmeal.

Coarse barley flour is made by milling barley groats.

== Production ==
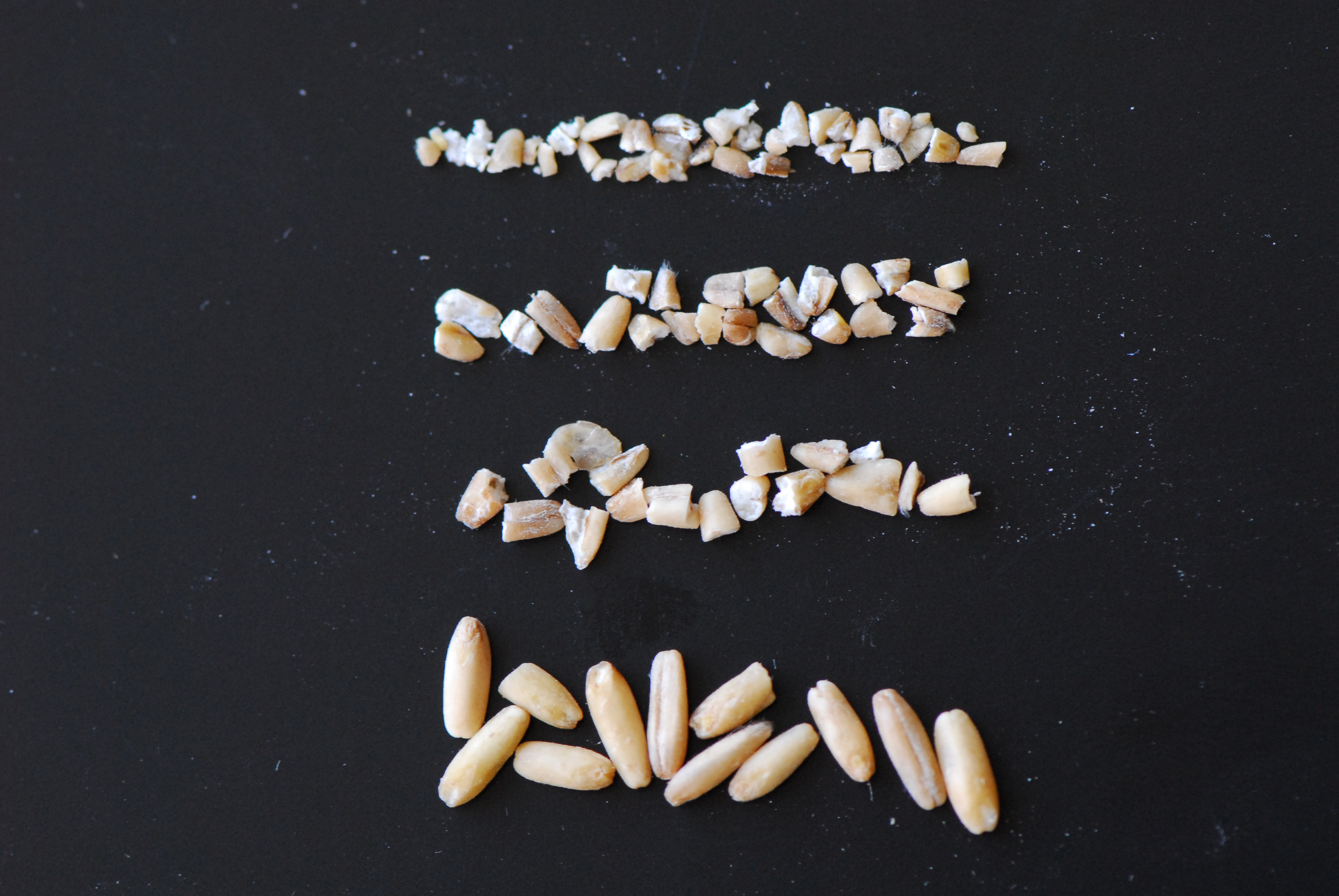
From the top: fine, medium, and coarsely cut oat groats (i.e. steel-cut oats) Bottom: uncut oat groats

The grain is cleaned, sorted by the type of grain, its size and then peeled (if necessary) before being hulled. Additionally, the grains can be sliced on a "groat cutter", which can be adjusted to cut fine, medium, or coarse groats. Regardless, thereafter, the groats are freed from any adhering parts of the shell by a brushing machine. In the case of cut groats, their fragments are sorted according to size by sieving.

== Types of groats ==
- Oat groats (a good source of avenanthramide)
- Millet groats
- Wheat groats, such as durum wheat groats, like bulgur
- Buckwheat groats (though buckwheat is a pseudocereal rather than a true cereal)

== See also ==
- List of porridges
- Groat sausage
- Grits
