= Soy curls =

Soy-based meat alternative

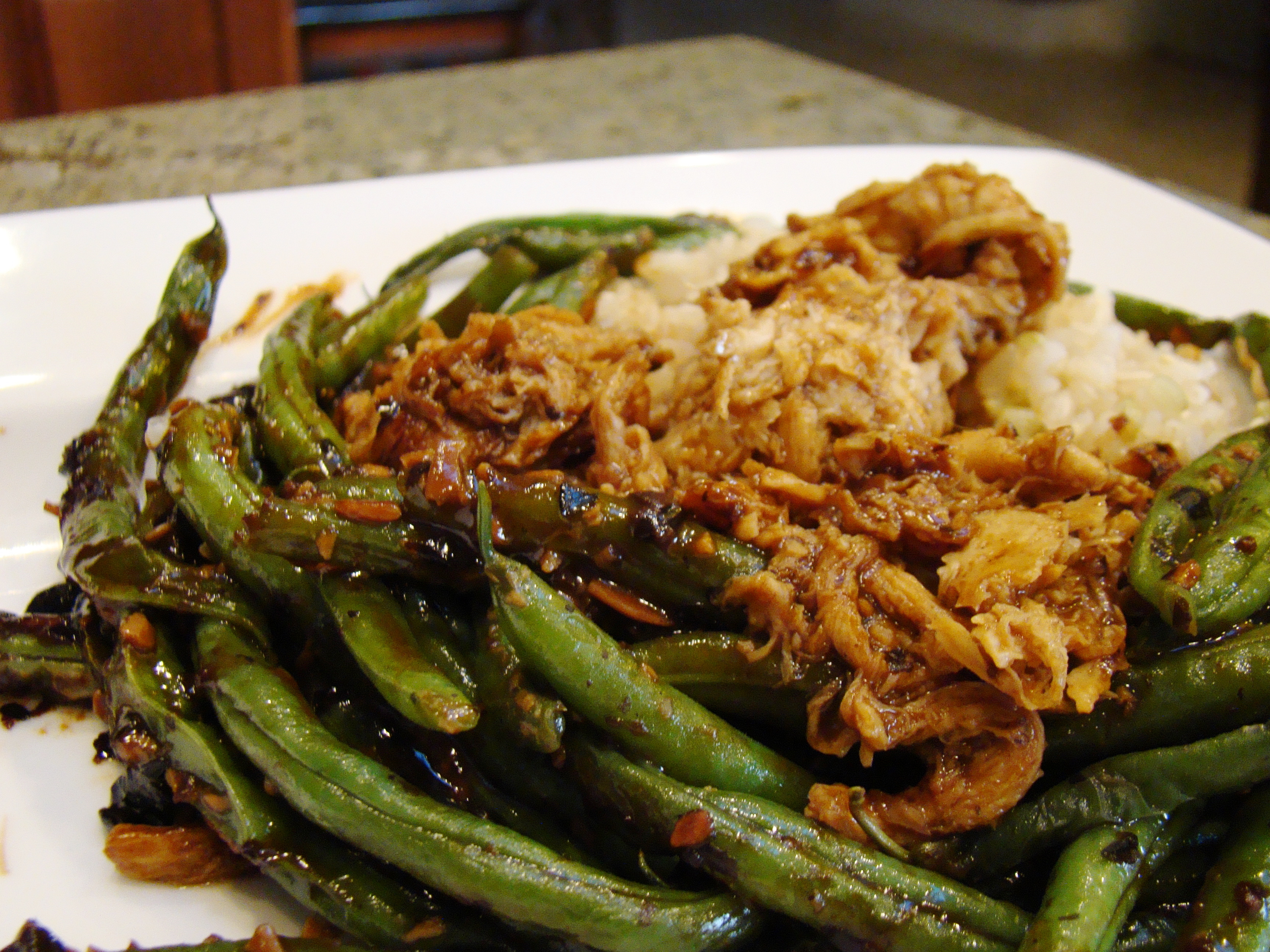
- Soy curls with green beans and brown rice
- Place of origin: United States
- Region or state: Oregon
- Created by: Butler Foods
- Invented: c. 2000
- Main ingredients: Soy beans
- Similar dishes: Textured vegetable protein

Nutritional value per 100 g
- Energy: 333 kcal (1,390 kJ)
- Carbohydrates: 16.7 g
- Sugars: 3.33 g
- Dietary fiber: 10 g
- Fat: 15 g
- Saturated: 0 g
- Trans: 0 g
- Protein: 33.3 g
Vitamins and minerals
Vitamins	Quantity %DV^{†}
Vitamin A	0 IU
Vitamin C	0% 0 mg
Minerals	Quantity %DV^{†}
Calcium	5% 67 mg
Iron	50% 9 mg
Sodium	0% 0 mg
- Other constituents: Quantity
- Cholesterol: 0 mg
- ^{†}Percentages estimated using US recommendations for adults.

Soy curls are a dehydrated soy-based meat substitute produced by Butler Foods, a family-owned company based in Oregon, United States. They are made from whole soybeans and are typically rehydrated before cooking, developing a chewy texture often compared with chicken or other shredded meat.

== Production and characteristics ==
Soy curls are made from whole soybeans that are soaked, cooked and dried to produce a shelf-stable, dehydrated product. Before cooking, they are typically rehydrated by soaking in water or broth for about ten minutes, then drained and squeezed to remove excess liquid.

Soy curls differ from textured vegetable protein (TVP), although both are dehydrated soy products that are rehydrated before cooking. TVP is generally made from defatted soy flour, while soy curls are made from whole soybeans and retain some of the soybeans' fat. After rehydration, soy curls develop a chewy, strand-like texture, while TVP commonly has a more finely flaked texture.

== Culinary use ==
Before cooking, dried soy curls are typically soaked in water or broth for about ten minutes and then drained and squeezed to remove excess liquid. Once rehydrated, they can be seasoned and cooked by methods such as sautéing or air-frying.

Their chewy texture allows them to be used as a meat substitute in dishes including stir-fries, salads, sandwiches and wraps. They may also be chopped after rehydration for use in dishes in place of ground or shredded meat.

== History ==
Soy curls were invented in Oregon by Butler Foods around the year 2000. The product was developed by Butler Foods, a family-owned company based in Grand Ronde, Oregon. In 2017, company owner Dan Butler said that Soy Curls had been produced for nearly 20 years and that growing demand had led the company to double its production.

Soy Curls became particularly associated with Portland's vegan food scene, where restaurants incorporated them into dishes such as shawarma, burritos, grain bowls and other plant-based preparations.
