= Textured vegetable protein =

Defatted soy flour food product

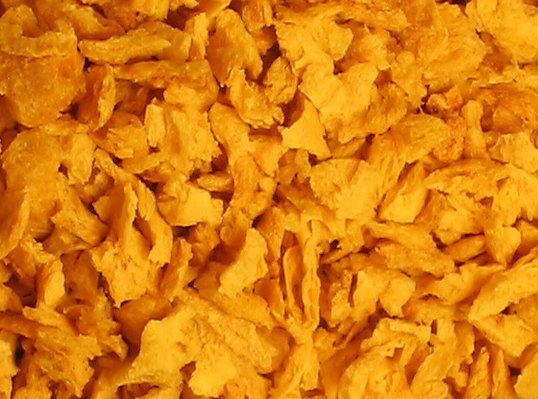
Dry TVP flakes are an inexpensive protein source when purchased in bulk and can be added to a variety of vegetarian dishes or used as a meat extender or supplement to bulk out a meat dish.

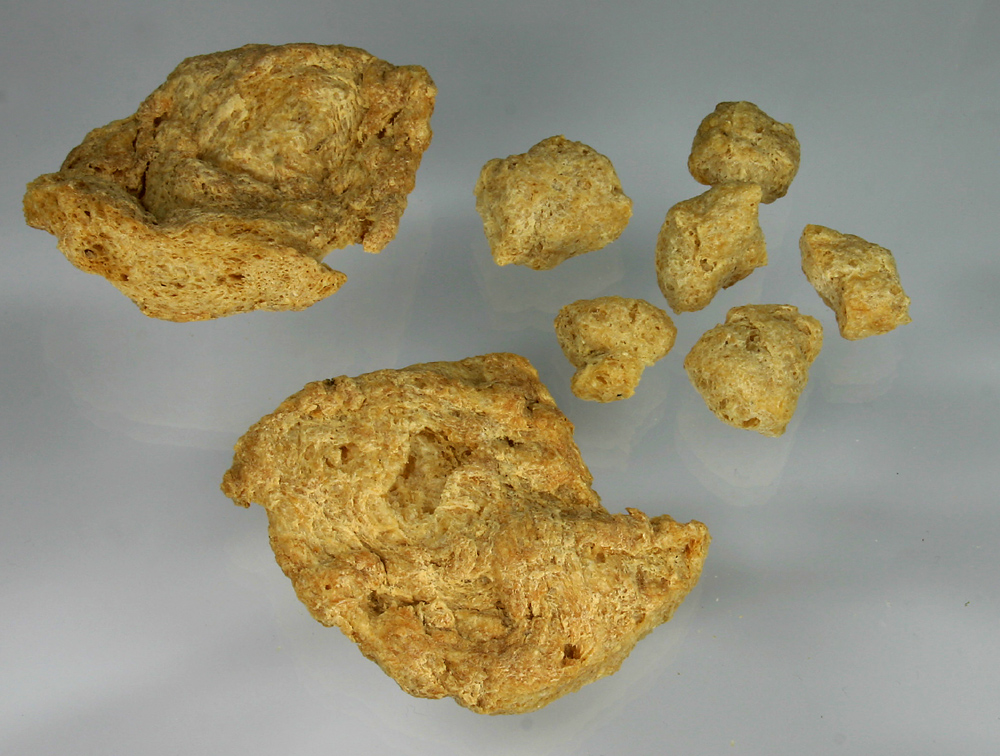
Textured soy chunks

Textured or texturized vegetable protein (TVP), also known as textured soy protein, soy meat, or soya chunks, is a defatted soy flour product, a by-product of extracting soybean oil. It is often used as a meat analogue or meat extender having a protein content greater than animal-derived meats.

TVP may be produced from any protein-rich seed meal left over from vegetable oil production. Specifically, a wide range of pulse seeds besides soybean, including lentils, peas, and faba beans, may be used for TVP production.

== History ==
Textured vegetable protein was invented by the agricultural commodities and food processing company Archer Daniels Midland in the 1960s, in Chicago, Illinois, the U.S.; the company owns the name "textured vegetable protein" and the acronym TVP as registered trademarks. Archer Daniels Midland had developed a textured soy protein isolate made with an extruder in the shape of rods or tubes. The soy protein isolate was produced in a small pilot plant and sold for use in Chili con carne, but the product was not commercially successful. By 1968, TVP was widely used in a variety of food products, and consumption skyrocketed after 1971, when TVP was approved for use in school lunch programs. By 1980, similar products were being produced by rival companies, but Archer Daniels Midland remained the leader in TVP production.

== Manufacturing process ==
TVP is usually made from high protein soy flour (approx. 50% soy protein) or concentrate (approx. 70% protein), but can also be made from cottonseed, wheat, and oats. It is extruded into various shapes (chunks, flakes, nuggets, grains, and strips) and sizes, exiting the nozzle while still hot and expanding. The defatted thermoplastic proteins are heated to 150–200 °C (300–390 °F), which denatures them into a fibrous, insoluble, porous network that can soak up as much as three times its weight in liquids. As the pressurized molten protein mixture exits the extruder, the sudden drop in pressure causes rapid expansion into a puffy solid that is then dried.

Many TVP producers use hexane to separate soy fat from soy protein, and trace amounts of the solvent are left after manufacturing. But the rodent studies that have been done suggest it would be almost impossible to get enough hexane from TVP to cause harm. Measured levels of residual hexane in TVP are around 20 parts per million; and studies in rodents suggest that 5 g/kg is the minimum dose at which undesirable effects may be observed.

== Properties ==
Textured vegetable protein, dry
Nutritional value per 100 g (3.5 oz)
- Energy: 366 kcal (1,530 kJ)
- Carbohydrates: 32.9 g
- Sugars: 16.42 g
- Dietary fiber: 17.5 g
- Fat: 3.33 g
- Saturated: 0.136 g
- Monounsaturated: 0.208 g
- Polyunsaturated: 0.533 g
- Protein: 51.1 g
Vitamins and minerals
Vitamins	Quantity %DV^{†}
Vitamin A equiv. beta-Carotene	0% 2 μg 0% 24 μg
Thiamine (B1)	45% 0.542 mg
Riboflavin (B2)	23% 0.298 mg
Niacin (B3)	21% 3.43 mg
Vitamin B6	36% 0.618 mg
Folate (B9)	76% 305 μg
Vitamin B12	0% 0 μg
Choline	2% 11.3 mg
Vitamin C	0% 0 mg
Vitamin E	1% 0.12 mg
Vitamin K	3% 4.1 μg
Minerals	Quantity %DV^{†}
Calcium	26% 338 mg
Copper	168% 1.51 mg
Iron	41% 7.34 mg
Magnesium	75% 313 mg
Phosphorus	58% 726 mg
Potassium	83% 2480 mg
Selenium	83% 45.8 μg
Sodium	0% 2 mg
Zinc	40% 4.44 mg
- Other constituents: Quantity
- Water: 6.24 g
- USDA FoodData Central
- ^{†}Percentages estimated using US recommendations for adults, except for potassium, which is estimated based on expert recommendation from the National Academies.

TVP can be made from soy flour or concentrate, containing 50% and 70% soy protein, respectively, imparting a mild beany flavor. Both require rehydration before use, sometimes with flavoring added in the same step. TVP is extruded, causing a change in the structure of the soy protein which results in a fibrous, spongy matrix, similar in texture to meat. In its dehydrated form, TVP has a shelf life of longer than a year, but will spoil within several days after being hydrated. In its flaked form, it can be used similarly to ground meat.

== Nutrition ==
Dried textured vegetable protein is 6% water, 51% protein, 33% carbohydrates, and 3% fat (table). In a reference amount of 100 grams (3.5 oz), it provides 327 calories of food energy, and is a rich source (20% or more of the Daily Value, DV) of several B vitamins, including folate (76% DV), and dietary minerals, especially copper, zinc, phosphorus, magnesium, and iron (40–168% DV; table).

Textured soy protein is a source of soy phytoestrogens. The processing required to arrive at defatted soy flour does not remove isoflavones. The process of extrusion cooking in making TVP reduces the concentration of antinutritional factors such as phytate.

== Uses ==
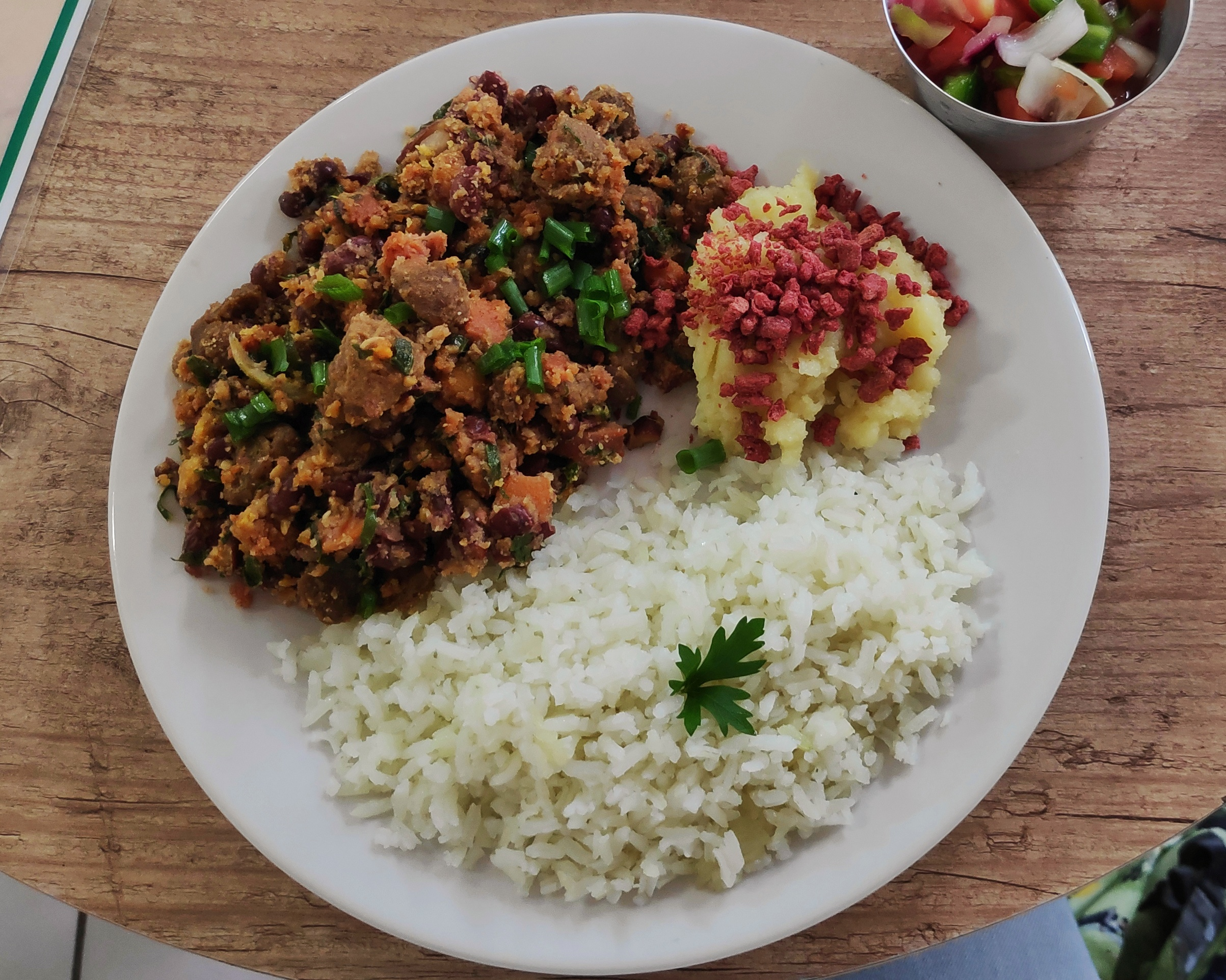
A meal using TVP

As much as 50% protein when dry, TVP can be rehydrated at a 2:1 ratio, which drops the percentage of protein to an approximation of ground meat at 16%. TVP is primarily used as a meat substitute due to its low cost at less than a third the price of ground beef and, when cooked together, will help retain more nutrients from the meat by absorbing juices normally lost.

Textured vegetable protein is a versatile substance; different forms allow it to take on the texture of whatever ground meat it is substituting. Using TVP, one can make vegetarian or vegan versions of traditionally meat-based dishes, such as chili con carne, spaghetti bolognese, sloppy joes, tacos, burgers, or burritos.

Soy protein can also be used as a low cost and high nutrition extender in comminuted meat and poultry products, and in tuna salads. Food service, retail and institutional (primarily school lunch and correctional) facilities regularly use such "extended" products. Extension may result in diminished flavor, although extra seasoning can suffice, but fat and cholesterol levels are decreased. TVP being used by itself as a substitute has no fat at all, and can be effectively seasoned to taste like red meat.

Textured vegetable protein can be found in health food stores and larger supermarkets, usually in the bulk section. TVP is also very lightweight and is often used in backpacking recipes. Because of its relatively low cost, high protein content, and long shelf life, TVP is often used in prisons and schools, as well as for disaster preparedness. Those with soy allergy, however, should avoid TVP.

== See also ==
- List of meat substitutes
- Mycoprotein – Type of single-cell fungal protein
- Seitan – Food made from gluten, the main protein of wheat
- Soy curls – Soy-based meat alternative
