= McWord =

Neologism comparing society to food chain

A McWord is a word containing the prefix Mc-, derived from the first syllable of the name of the McDonald's restaurant chain. Words of this nature are either official marketing terms of the chain (such as McNugget), or are neologisms designed to evoke pejorative associations with the restaurant chain or fast food in general, often for qualities of cheapness, inauthenticity, or the speed and ease of manufacture. They are also used in non-consumerism contexts as a pejorative for heavily commercialized or globalized things and concepts.

== Examples ==
=== Official McDonald's products and branding concepts ===
- McCafé
- McInternet – A free Wi-Fi service in some U.S. McDonald's restaurants. In Venezuela and Brazil, it is an Internet cafe service offered in several McDonald's restaurants.
- McState, now McHire – The McDonald's job and career search service
- McWorld – The term was used in a mid-1990s McDonald's advertising campaign depicting a world ruled by children. It is also used in a critical way to emphasize the deprecation of local culture in favor of a global culture prescribed by large corporations.
- McNuggets
- McAfrika
- McArabia
- McChicken
- McDelivery
- McDouble
- McDrive
- McFlurry
- McKroket
- McMuffin
- McPlant
- McRib
- McVegan
- McVeggie

=== McWords not officially related to McDonald's ===
- McChurch – A megachurch.
- McDonaldization – The process by which a society takes on the characteristics of a fast-food restaurant.
- McDojo – A martial arts school (dojo) seen as sacrificing pedagogic principles in favor of offering rapid advancement through the various ranks, often requiring a fee to be paid to achieve a higher rank (often denoted by a colored belt, hence the use of another pejorative name, "belt factory", analogous to a degree mill).
- McJob – A low-paying job in which one serves as an interchangeable cog in a corporate machine; originally appearing in an article in The Washington Post in 1986 and later popularised by Douglas Coupland's novel Generation X: Tales for an Accelerated Culture.
- McLibel case and McLibel (film)
- McMansion – Quickly-built mansions; a group of large houses built in the same style in the same area.
- McOndo – A Latin American literary movement. The name is a spoof on the fictional village of Macondo.
- McPaper (or McNews) – A newspaper that is considered manufactured and "for the masses" because of its simplistic prose style and flashy use of colors. Typically used in reference to USA Today.
- McRefugee – People who stay overnight in a 24-hour McDonald's.
- McStroke – The eighth episode of season six of the animated comedy series Family Guy.

== See also ==
- Cocacolonization
- Disneyfication
- Walmarting
- "Tesco Value" for a similar usage in the UK, referring to the supermarket Tesco's own budget brand.
- Internet-related prefixes
- Boaty McBoatface and List of Mcface spoofs
