= Impossible Whopper =

Vegetarian burger sold by Burger King

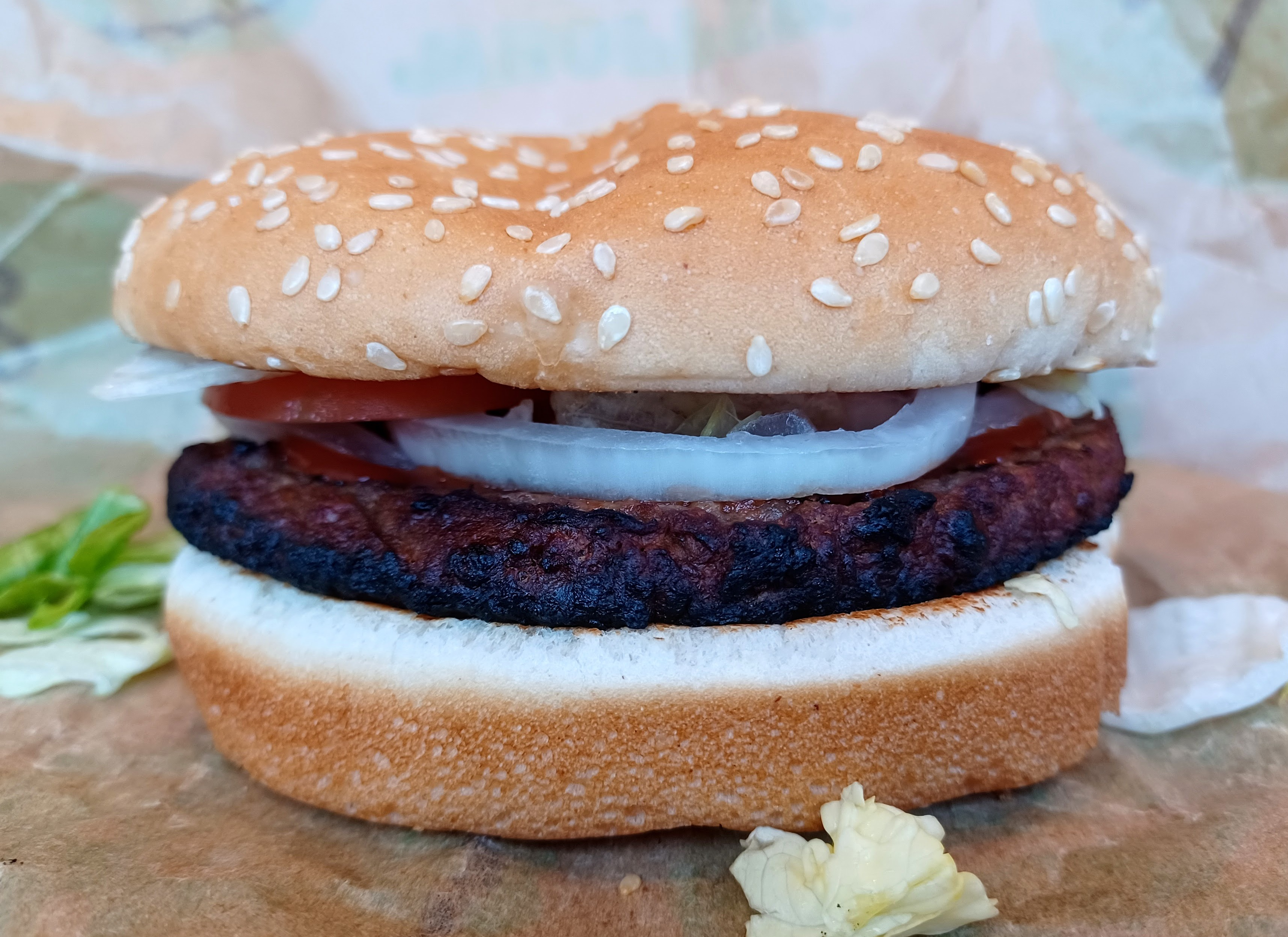
- The Impossible Whopper

Nutritional value per 1 sandwich
- Energy: 630 kcal (2,600 kJ)
- Carbohydrates: 62 g
- Sugars: 14 g
- Dietary fiber: 6.2 g
- Fat: 34 g
- Saturated: 10.1 g
- Trans: 0.2 g
- Protein: 28.5 g
Vitamins and minerals
Minerals	Quantity %DV^{†}
Sodium	59% 1350.3 mg
- Other constituents: Quantity
- Cholesterol: 15.1 mg
- ^{†}Percentages estimated using US recommendations for adults.

The Impossible Whopper is a veggie burger sold by Burger King. It is a variant of the Whopper, with a burger patty made from a meat alternative provided by Impossible Foods. It was first introduced in the United States in 2019 and made available in Canada in 2021.

By default, the Impossible Whopper is topped with tomatoes, lettuce, mayonnaise, ketchup, pickles, and onions; as with any other Burger King sandwich, customers can ask for toppings to be added or removed. It is typically cooked on the same grill as meat patties, though customers can request for it to be cooked separately.

Customers' opinions vary on how closely the Impossible Whopper resembles the beef Whopper. Reviewers have praised the burger's environmental benefits compared to the beef Whopper.

== Development and initial roll-out ==
The Impossible Whopper was rolled out in 2019. Burger King already sold other veggie burgers before this, but they were not intended to be as meatlike as the Impossible Whopper. Burger King considered selling a burger from Beyond Meat but decided on Impossible Foods instead.

In developing the burger, Impossible Foods used the same recipe as their other products (their Impossible Burger was released in 2016) but redesigned the patties to match the shape of the regular Whopper and fit in the same bun. The Impossible Foods factory in Oakland, California, added an additional production line specifically for Impossible Whoppers. Burger King began test marketing the new burger in April 2019 at 59 locations in and around St. Louis, Missouri. This initial launch was accompanied with an April Fools-themed promotional video on April 1, 2019. That month, Burger King restaurants in St. Louis saw an increase in foot traffic, outperforming Burger King's average foot traffic nationwide by 18.5%, according to a market research firm. In May 2019, the trial was expanded to four cities.

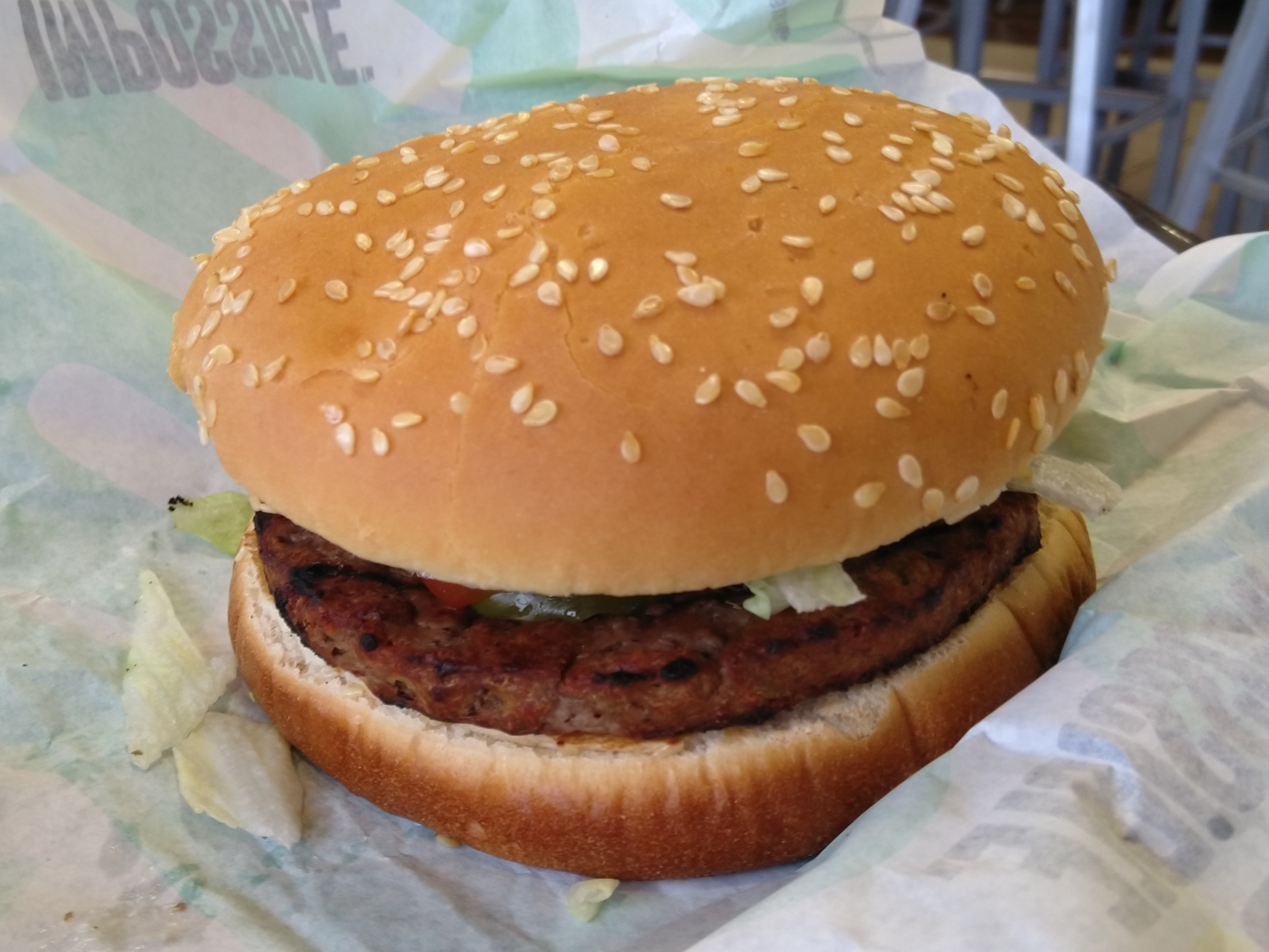
An Impossible Whopper photographed in September 2019

In August 2019, the Impossible Whopper was made available nationwide, initially as a limited-time trial. Its price was $5.59, while the regular Whopper cost about $1 less. It was marketed as "100% Whopper, 0% Beef". As part of the rollout, Burger King offered a taste test box: customers could pay $7 to receive both a regular Whopper and an Impossible Whopper from DoorDash.

Burger King executive Chris Finazzo said that the new burger had "driven new guests into the restaurant", and Jose Cil, the CEO of Burger King's parent company Restaurant Brands International, said that it could "be part of the Burger King menu for the long term". In October 2019, Restaurant Brands International reported strong growth in sales, attributed to the popularity of the Impossible Whopper. The burger stayed on Burger King's menu and was still available in late 2022. As of 2024, Impossible Whopper is still available.

The introduction of the burger was seen as a promising sign for the future of the meat alternative industry. When it was first piloted in St. Louis, The New York Times reported that if Burger King began selling it throughout the United States, this would "more than double the total number of locations where Impossible's burgers are available". The Guardian wrote that the "fanfare" of the August 2019 rollout "would have been unimaginable" a decade before. Eric Bohl, a meat lobbyist, called the burger a wake-up call for his industry, stressing how similar the Impossible Whopper was to a beef burger.

Burger King expanded the Impossible Whopper to Canada in 2021, first in Ontario in March and then nationwide in April. In Europe, Burger King introduced a different veggie burger in 2019: the Rebel Whopper, which is not made by Impossible Foods.

== Comparison with the regular Whopper ==
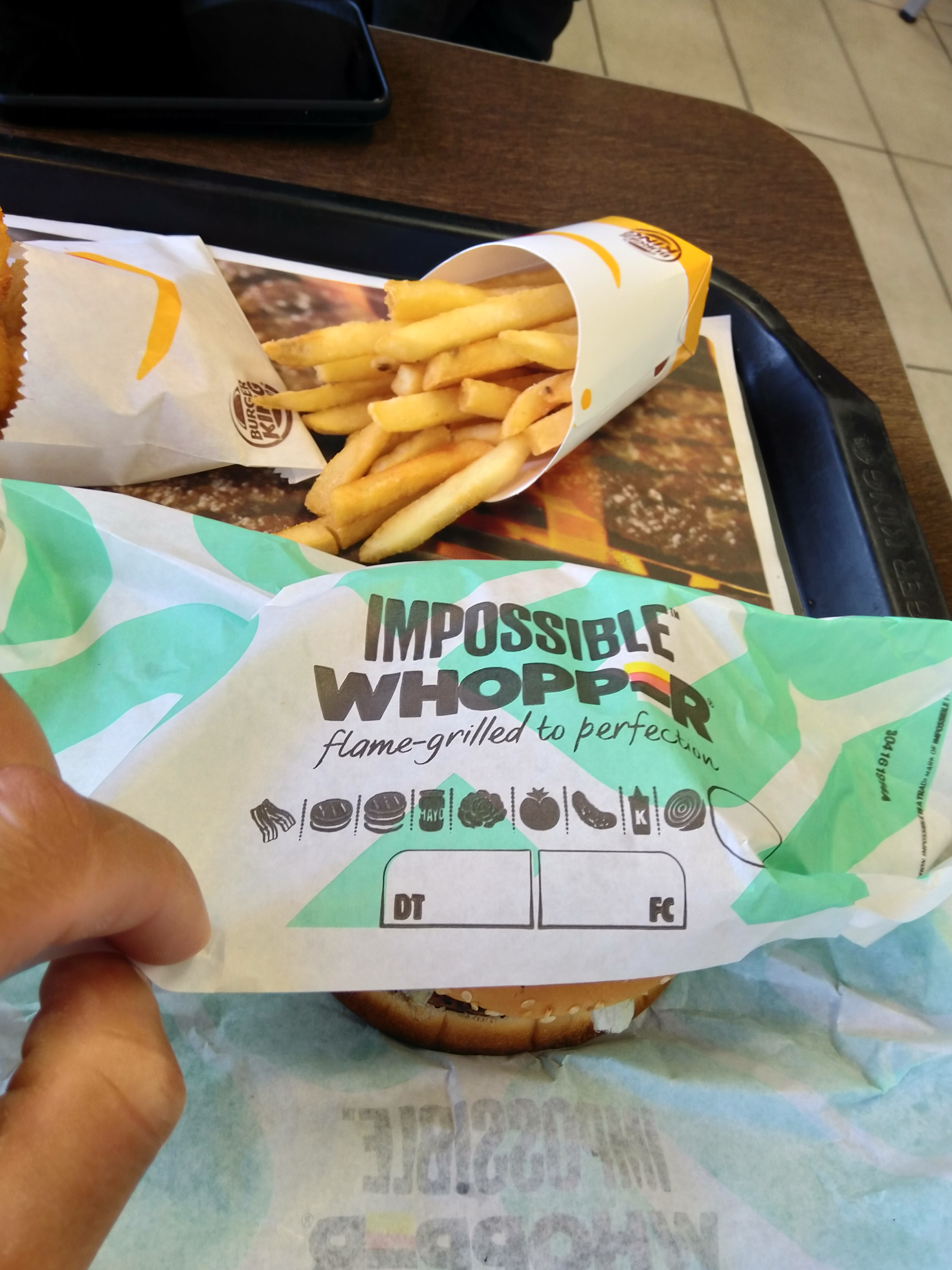
Impossible Whopper in packaging with sides

Burger King executive Fernando Machado said that in taste tests, employees and customers could not distinguish between the Impossible Whopper and a regular beef Whopper. Both types of Whoppers use the same bun and the same preparation by restaurant staff. The Impossible Whopper is wrapped in a distinct wrapper that says "Impossible Whopper". It is more expensive than a regular Whopper, with a price difference of about $1 or $2.

In terms of nutrition, the Impossible Whopper has a similar amount of protein to the regular Whopper but less fat, slightly less saturated fat, slightly fewer calories, and much less cholesterol; it also has slightly more sodium. Nutritionist Mhairi Brown said: "It's difficult to say which one is healthier, because ultimately we know a burger is not a healthy choice." Instead of beef, the Impossible Whopper patty is made from ingredients including soy protein, potato protein, coconut oil, sunflower oil, soy leghemoglobin (containing heme), and methylcellulose. A reviewer for the Tampa Bay Times mentioned that it does not have the antibiotics and hormones often used in beef production.

Reviewers commented that the Impossible Whopper is more environmentally friendly than the regular Whopper. According to the Tampa Bay Times, it uses 95% less land and 74% less water and creates 87% fewer emissions.

== Reception ==
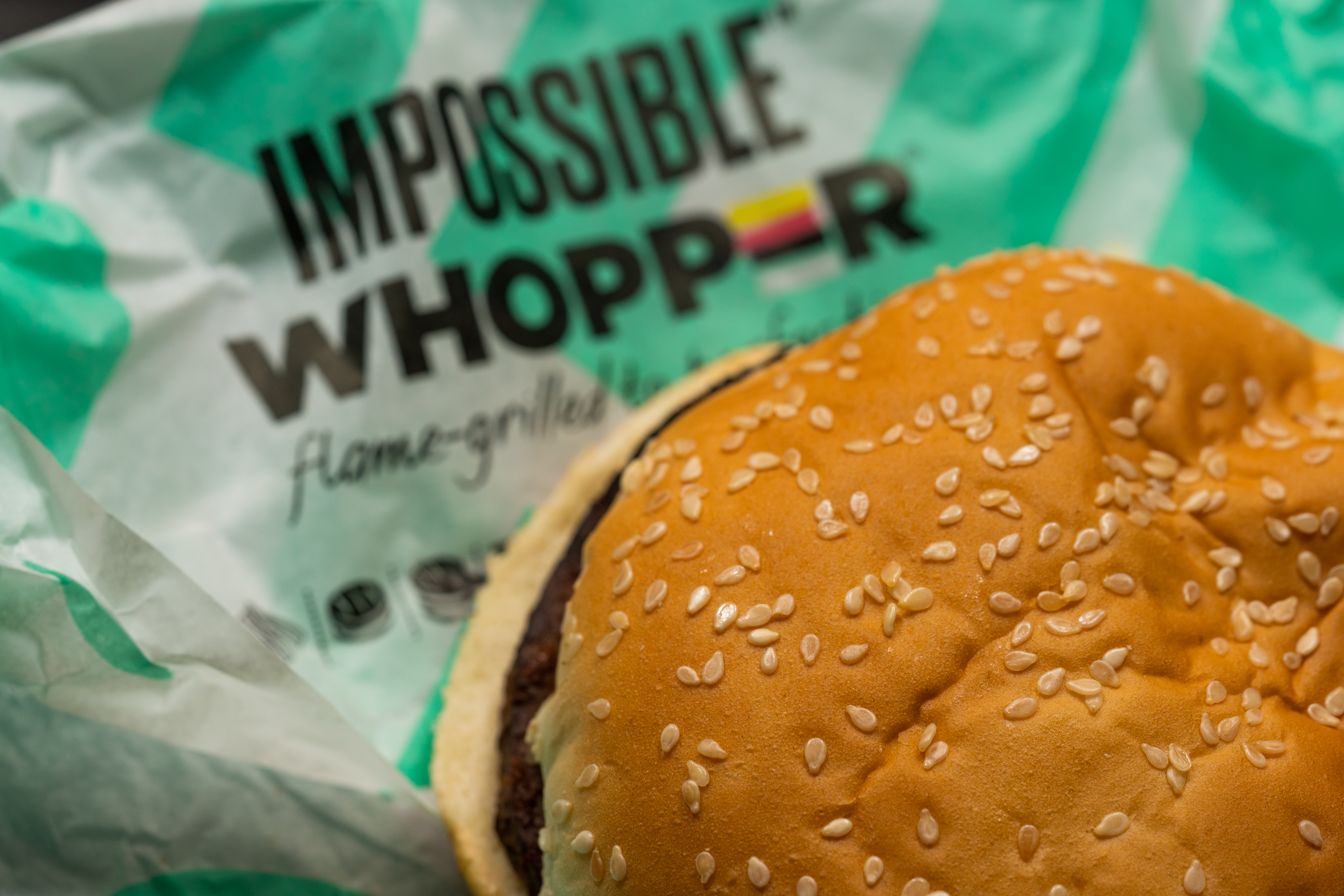
Impossible Whopper and packaging

Customers' opinions vary on how similar the Impossible Whopper is to the regular Whopper; some say that it is almost identical, others think it is not even close. Some reviewers found the texture to be similar, while others found that the Impossible Whopper was dry or missing the crumbliness of beef. Reviewers at Foodology found that they "really couldn't tell the difference at all".

Megan Schaltegger of Delish found that the burger tasted "nearly identical to an OG Whopper", saying that she double-checked her receipt to make sure it really was not meat. Meat industry lobbyist Eric Bohl likewise said "If I didn't know what I was eating, I would have no idea it was not beef." Zachary Fagenson of the Miami New Times said the burger's taste and texture were very similar to the regular Whopper and praised Burger King for providing an environmentally friendly alternative to beef. Another positive review came from Antonio Villas-Boas writing for Business Insider, who said that although the Impossible Whopper was not as good as the regular Whopper, it was better than most veggie burgers. Despite being a meat-eater, Villas-Boas continued buying the Impossible Whopper, saying that "reducing the amount of meat in my diet can only be a good thing".

Writing for The Washington Post, Tim Carman said that the Impossible Whopper patty is more flavorful than the traditional beef patty because the bar is set extremely low. He concluded: "The product is close enough to beef that your brain is willing to fill in the rest of the flavors, even if somewhere in the dark recesses of your cerebral cortex, you know it's all a lie." Adam Bible of Eat This, Not That wrote that the burger was "good, almost great". He was impressed by the burger's meatlike taste, but when he tried a regular Whopper alongside it, he found that the Impossible Whopper paled in comparison. Similarly, the Tampa Bay Times's Christopher Spata said that eating the two versions together made the Impossible Whopper feel inadequate.

Alison Cook of the Houston Chronicle said that although the patty differed from the regular Whopper in taste and texture, this did not matter too much because of the burger's lavish condiments. She called the Impossible Whopper "a burgerlike experience" rather than a burger, and gave it a D+ compared to the regular Whopper's C−. Thrillist's Adam Rothbarth likewise said that the condiments were the main source of flavor compared to the patty itself, which is something that, according to Tim Carman's Impossible Whopper review, is also true of the regular Whopper. Rothbarth found that the burger tasted very much like a regular Whopper but that "the question shouldn't be whether it tastes like a Whopper (it does), it should be whether it tastes good (not especially)." Rothbarth and The Spoon's Chris Albrecht both said that Burger King's interpretation was not as good as other restaurants' versions of the Impossible Burger. Nonetheless, Rothbarth expressed approval for Burger King's decision to introduce the Impossible Whopper.

Food blogger Matt Taylor said the burger "didn't taste exactly like meat, but fairly similar"; he concluded that it was not quite as good as a beef Whopper but that some consumers might not be able to tell the difference. The Spoon's Chris Albrecht said it was good but "definitely wouldn't fool a meat eater", concluding that he would order one again in the future for environmental reasons. Both Taylor and Albrecht commented that the patty's shape looked too perfect. Alison Cook of the Houston Chronicle similarly noted that the edge of the Impossible patty is straight whereas the beef patty's edge is irregular, and Zachary Fagenson of the Miami New Times said it was "a near-perfect circle with right angles at its edges".

Two reviewers from The Diamondback called the Impossible Whopper bland. One called it a "solid meatless option", while the other concluded that like the regular Whopper, it has the characteristic low quality of fast food.

One reviewer from the Tampa Bay Times found the Impossible Whopper to be better than the regular Whopper, saying that the plant-based burger tasted like beef, whereas the beef burger was too greasy and had a soggy bun.

TheReportOfTheWeek enjoyed the Impossible Whopper. He remarked that the burger was distinguishable from the traditional beef patty in terms of taste and texture, but still good in its own way with a rich, organic, and earthy flavor. He said that he would buy it again in the future, and gave it a total score of 8.2/10.

== Vegetarian and vegan options and cross-contamination ==
The Impossible Whopper is prepared with mayonnaise and is cooked on the same grill as all other burgers. As such, it is not strictly vegetarian or vegan by default. Customers who want to avoid cross-contamination with meat products can ask for it to be prepared separately, in an oven or a microwave instead of on the grill. Customers who want to make it vegan can ask for no mayonnaise.

The burger is not marketed as vegetarian, and it is targeted mainly at customers who want to reduce their animal product consumption but are not strictly vegetarian or vegan. When Burger King was still looking into introducing the burger, its North American head Chris Finazzo said he was surprised to learn that much of the demand for meat substitutes comes from flexitarians. Burger King has also said that some vegans are not concerned about cross-contamination from cooking food on the same grill as meat products.

=== Lawsuit ===
In November 2019, a customer by the name of Phillip Williams sued Burger King in a class action lawsuit after he bought an Impossible Whopper without knowing that it was cooked on the same grill as meat burgers. Williams, who is vegan, bought the burger at a drive-through in Atlanta and said that he would not have bought it if he had known that it was "coated in meat by-products". In addition to damages, he asked for an injunction to force Burger King to "clearly disclose" that the different burgers are cooked on the same grill. Williams was joined by six other plaintiffs and filed the lawsuit in Miami, where Burger King is based, in the United States District Court for the Southern District of Florida. In July 2020, the lawsuit was dismissed by district judge Raag Singhal, who said that the plaintiffs did not represent a valid class, that they failed to show they were deceived into paying a higher price for the burger, and that "Burger King promised a non-meat patty and delivered".

== See also ==
- Environmental impacts of animal agriculture – Impact of farming animals on the environment
- List of Burger King products
- List of meat substitutes
- McPlant – McDonald's vegetarian burger
- McVegan – Vegan hamburger sold by McDonald's
- McVeggie – Vegetable hamburger sold by McDonald's
- Rebel Whopper – Plant-based hamburger sold at Burger King and Hungry Jack's
- Plant-Based Whopper - Plant-based hamburger sold at Burger King in Europe and other areas
