= Veggie burger =

Non-meat hamburger

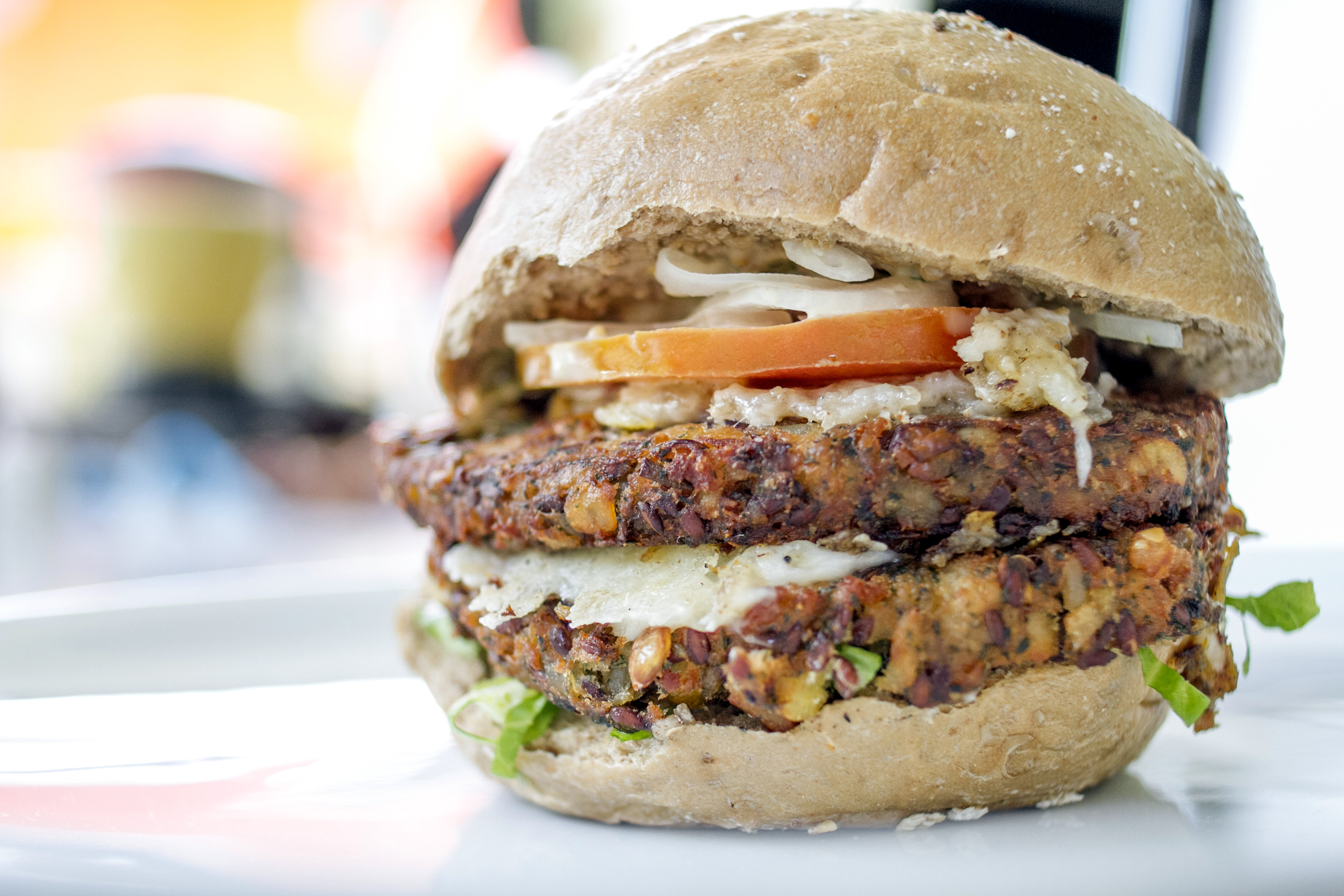
- Double vegan burger with tomato, lettuce and sauce
- Alternative names: Meatless burger
- Type: Sandwich
- Main ingredients: Vegetables, textured vegetable protein, legumes, nuts, mushrooms, or grains or seeds

A veggie burger or meatless burger is a hamburger made with a patty that does not contain meat, or the patty of such a hamburger. The patty may be made from ingredients like beans (especially soybeans and tofu), nuts, grains, seeds, or fungi such as mushrooms or mycoprotein.

The essence of the veggie burger patty has existed in various Eurasian cuisines for millennia, including in the form of grilled or fried meatless discs, or as koftas, a commonplace item in Indian cuisine. These may be made of entirely vegetarian ingredients such as legumes or other plant-derived proteins.

== Preparation ==
Whilst commercial brands of veggie burger are widespread, hundreds of recipes exist for veggie burgers online and in cookbooks, aimed at the home cook and based on cereal grains, nuts, seeds, breadcrumbs, beans, textured soya protein, with starchy flours or flaxseed meal to stabilize the mix. Recipes offer a variety of flavors and textures, often containing herbs and spices and ingredients, like tamari or nutritional yeast, to increase the umami taste. Desirable characteristics include mouthfeel, a seared surface, crunch, chewiness, spiciness and resistance to crumbling. Like a meat burger, they can be pan fried, grilled, barbecued or oven cooked. Some are designed to be eaten in a toasted bun or brioche, with similar accompaniments to a traditional meat burger, such as tomato slices, onion rings, dill pickled cucumber, mayonnaise, mustard and ketchup. Others are stand-alone patties that are eaten with other vegetables, salad or a dipping sauce. Home produced veggie burgers can be frozen and stored, just like commercial varieties.

== Commercial brands ==
Products include dried mixes to which water is added before cooking, or ready-made burgers, often found in the store chiller or freezer compartments. Some popular brands of veggie burger include the Boca Burger, the Gardenburger, Morningstar Farms, and Quorn. In the 2010s, realistic meat-like burgers were developed, led by the companies Beyond Meat and Impossible Foods.

== Origin ==
There have been numerous claims of invention of the veggie burger. The dish, by name, may have been created in London in 1982 by Gregory Sams, who called it the 'VegeBurger'. Sams and his brother Craig had run a natural food restaurant in Paddington since the 1960s; a Carrefour hypermarket in Southampton sold 2000 packets in three weeks after its launch. An earlier reference can be heard in the 7 June 1948 episode of the American radio drama series Let George Do It called "The Mister Mirch Case" where a character refers to "vegeburgers" as a burger made of nuts and legumes.

Food writer Pen Vogler considers a recipe for "benes yfryed" in the 14th century recipe book The Forme of Cury to be similar to a modern broad bean burger: "Take benes and seeþ hem almost til þey bersten. take and wryng out þer water clene. do þerto Oynouns ysode and ymynced. and garlec þerwith. frye hem in oile. oþer in grece. & do þerto powdour douce. & serue it forth."

Using the name Gardenburger, an early veggie burger was developed by Paul Wenner around 1980 or 1981 in Wenner's vegetarian restaurant, The Gardenhouse, in Gresham, Oregon.

== Restaurants ==
Some fast food companies have been offering vegetarian foods increasingly since the beginning of the 21st century.

=== India ===
In India where vegetarianism is widespread, McDonald's, Burger King, Wendy's and KFC serve veggie burgers. In 2012, McDonald's opened its first vegetarian-only restaurant in India. A popular type of burger is the Vada pav, also known as the Bombay burger. It originated in or near the city of Mumbai and consists of a fritter (vada), cooked with potatoes mixed with green chilis and various spices, enclosed in a bread roll (pav).

=== United States ===
Burger King (BK) introduced a veggie burger in 2002, the first to be made available nationally in the U.S. They have also sold veggie burgers in their Australian franchise, Hungry Jack's. In 2019, BK rolled out the Impossible Whopper as a veggie burger that realistically imitates their signature beef-based Whopper hamburger.

Veggie burgers have been sold in certain Subways and Harvey's, as well as many chain restaurants, such as Red Robin, Chili's, Denny's, Friendly's, Culvers, Johnny Rockets, and Hard Rock Cafe. Occasionally the veggie burger option will appear at the bottom of a menu as a possible substitution for beef or turkey burgers, rather than as an individual menu item.

=== Burger King ===
Besides introducing a plant-based variant of its Whopper in the United States (called the Impossible Whopper), Burger King sells a plant-based variant of the Whopper abroad, including in Europe (called the Rebel Whopper or the Plant-Based Whopper). In Germany, Burger King has already introduced plant-based versions of every item on the menu, using plant-based substitutes of beef and plant-based substitutes of chicken.

=== McDonald's ===
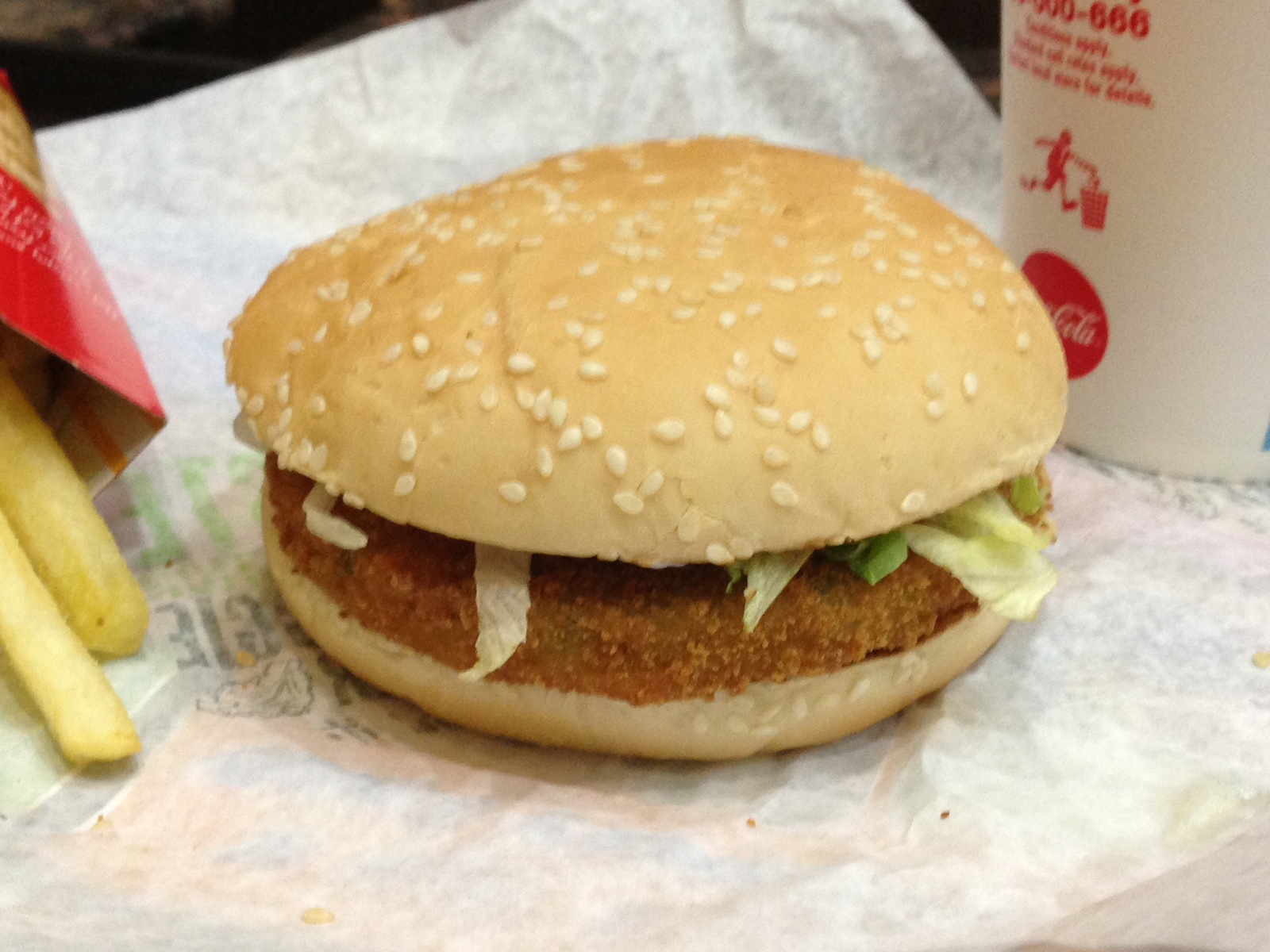
A McVeggie sandwich from a McDonald's in India

Different kinds of veggie burgers, including the vegetarian McVeggie, the vegan McVegan, and the McPlant, are also served permanently in McDonald's restaurants in:

- India (McVeggie, consisting of a fried, breaded patty of ground vegetables, with lettuce and ketchup, in a wholewheat, sesame or focaccia bun)
- Bahrain
- Cheung Chau, Hong Kong (McVeggie, in Cheung Chau Bun Festival)
- Egypt (McFalafel, consisting of a falafel patty with tomato, lettuce and tahini sauce)
- Finland (McVegan)
- Germany since February 2010, McDonald's Germany, its fourth-biggest global market, is serving veggie burgers in all its restaurants.
- Greece (McVeggie, consisting of a breaded and fried vegetable patty with tomato, iceberg lettuce and ketchup, in a sesame bun)
- Malaysia
- The Netherlands (Groentenburger=Vegetable Burger)
- Portugal (McVeggie, since November 2016)
- New Zealand (McVeggie, since December 2019)
- Sweden (McVegan)
- Switzerland (Vegi Mac)
- United Arab Emirates
- United Kingdom (McPlant)

== Manufacturing process ==
Manufacturing often follows certain steps. One commercial recipe runs as follows.

The grains and vegetables used in the patties are first washed and thoroughly cleaned to help ensure the removal of dirt, bacteria, chemical residues, and other materials that may be on the raw products. This process can either be done by hand or through the use of machinery such as high-pressure sprayers. With the use of a conveyor belt, the food is moved along under a high-pressure sprayer to remove the debris listed above. Another method that may be used by companies is the use of a hollow drum which circulates the food while water is sprayed onto it to remove the debris.

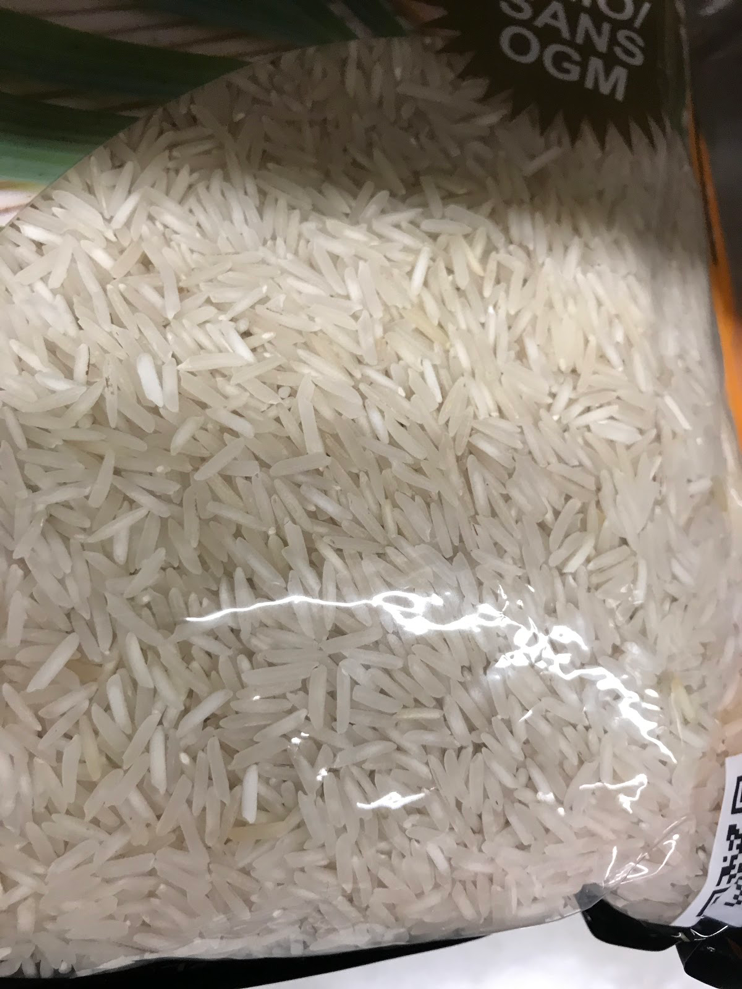
Grains of rice before cooking

Next, a steam-heated mixer is used to cook the grain and remove any extra debris and excess water. The mixer typically has oils within it (such as safflower oil). As the oil simmers, the grains are gradually added in and the blades are used to mix the grains around. The steam created in the mixer allows the grains to cook resulting in a puree.

Next the vegetables are cut up into smaller pieces to allow more surface area for cooking purposes. This can be done by hand or through the use of machines in factories.

The vegetables are then added to the grain mixture in the steam-heated mixture. The exact ratio of grains to vegetables is unique to each company, resulting in different textures and tastes that are produced.

As the vegetables are being cooked in the mixer, their natural sugars release, resulting in caramelization. The sweet flavors thus created from this caramelization are mixed uniformly in the mixer. The technique used for the creation of this caramelization mixture is called mirepoix. This technique is very important to the production of veggie burgers, as it adds both texture and flavor to the patty.

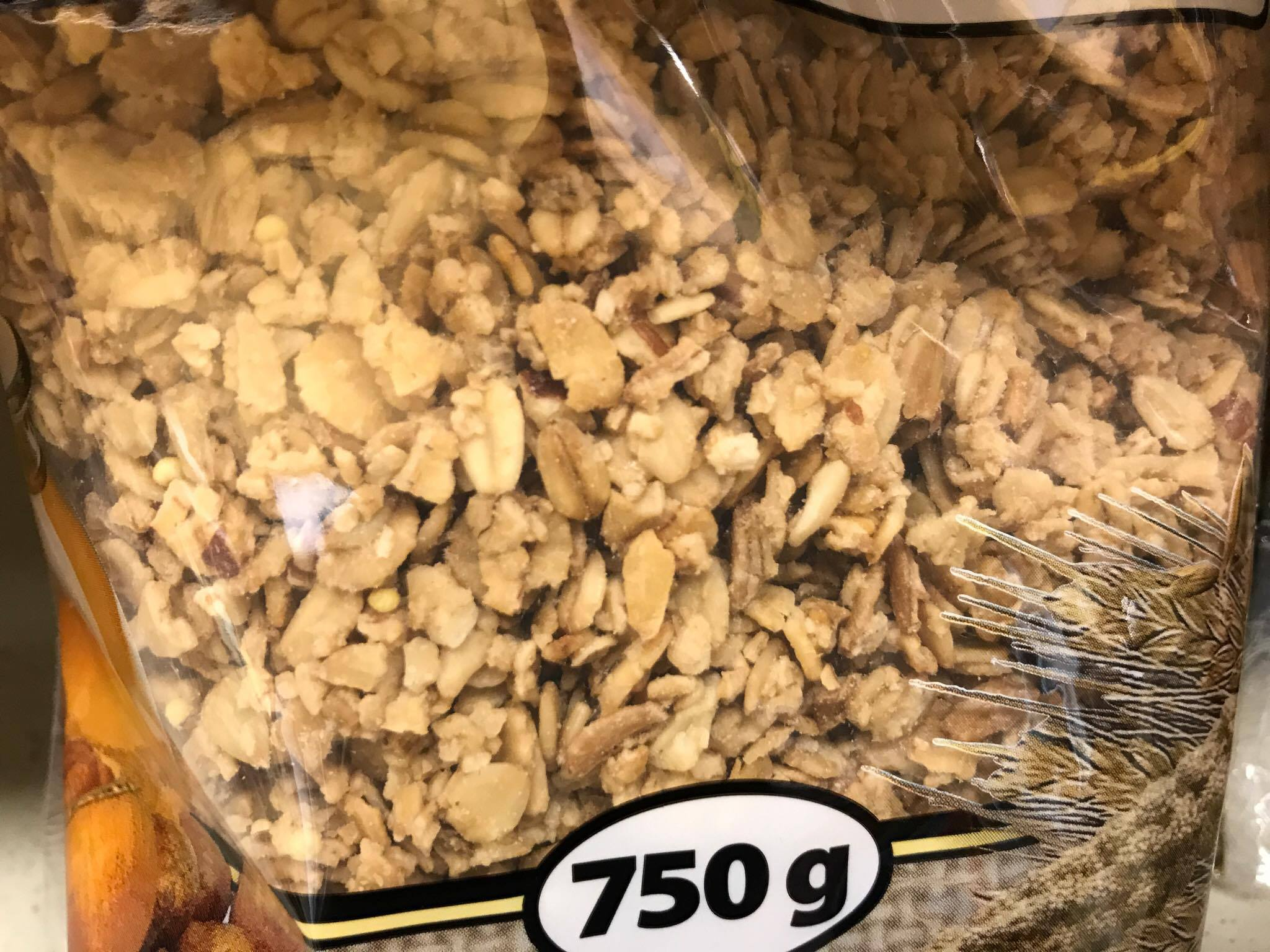
Dry ingredients, such as oats, can be added to the manufacturing process.

The mirepoix mixture is then placed into another mixing tub, where dry ingredients such as oats, walnuts, potato flakes, and more are added. The mixture is then folded together to make a uniform mix. The moisture from the vegetables causes the mixture to become sticky, thus clumping together like cookie dough. This is important, as it allows the veggie burger to stick together to form the patty.

The mixture is now put into an automatic patty-making machine or press. The press then punches out the patties into a disc shape onto a conveyor belt underneath. A constant spray of water may also be used to prevent any of the mixture from sticking to machinery parts. Once on the conveyor tray, the patties move along to be put onto baking trays.

Patties are first inspected to make sure they are the correct shape, size, and texture to ensure a high-quality product. The trays are then put into a heated convection oven at a designated temperature and time.

Once out of the oven, the patties are quickly frozen with techniques such as individual quick freezing and cryogenic freezing. These quick-freezing methods freeze the patties within 30 minutes to lock in nutrients and preserve texture by the formation of a number of small ice crystals.

The frozen patties are again placed on a conveyor belt that takes them to a vacuum-packaging machine. The machine seals the patties into measured plastic sleeves and draws out any excess air. The packages are then loaded into printed cardboard boxes with the aid of another machine or done manually. The flaps on the box are then sealed closed and the product is kept in temperature-controlled storage before, during, and after delivery to grocery stores.

== Purpose of ingredients ==
=== Grains ===
Grains are primarily used in the manufacturing of veggie burgers to act as a meat substitute. The grains, such as rice and wheat, provide carbohydrates and protein components and to provide bulk to the patty. They also provide texture to the burger, which can change depending on the type of grain used. This texture and look is important as they wish to make the patty look like a beef patty.

=== Vegetables ===
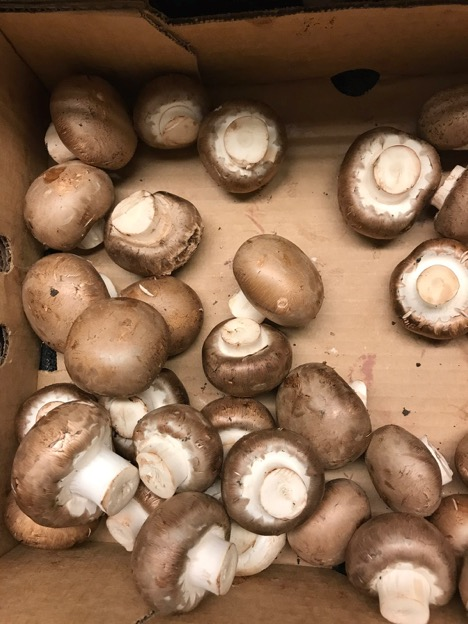
Mushrooms prior to cooking

Vegetables, such as corn, carrots, and mushrooms, provide texture and taste. Additionally, they provide moisture when heated. This allows the disc shape without breaking apart easily. The vegetables also provide nutrients with the addition of some vitamins and minerals.

=== Dry ingredients ===
Adding dry ingredients, such as oats, flours, nuts, or breadcrumbs, can absorb excess moisture and liquid, which results in the patty sticking together tightly. This could turn the moist veggie patties into a sticky consistency, which also helps the patties shape easily. Dry ingredients provide proteins and fiber, which add nutritional value to the veggie patty. Dry ingredients, such as walnuts and almonds, are also rich in energy, vitamins and minerals.

=== Stabilizers ===
Tapioca starch and vegetable gum are two common ingredients used as stabilizers in veggie burger. Tapioca starch is often used as a thickening agent due to its cheaper price. It gets sticky once it is wet, which helps to hold the burger patty tightly together. Vegetable gum also helps to hold everything together in the patty.

=== Oils ===
Oils, such as safflower, coconut, and olive oil, can lubricate the grain mix, and allow further cooking processing when the wheat is added. This facilitates the Maillard reaction and brings out the flavors of the veggie burger. Oils can also prevent the ingredients from sticking to the mixing machine, thus allowing them to be mixed well and heated together.

=== Salt ===
Salt is typically used for flavor, and may also be used as a preservative in veggie burgers. With the use of salt, the water activity of the food is reduced. This helps prevent the growth of micro-organisms and prolongs the shelf life of the food.

== Naming ==
In October 2020, the EU rejected an amendment proposed by the Committee on Agriculture and Rural Development which, if passed, would have resulted in companies being forced to call veggie burgers by the term "veggie discs".

== Gallery ==
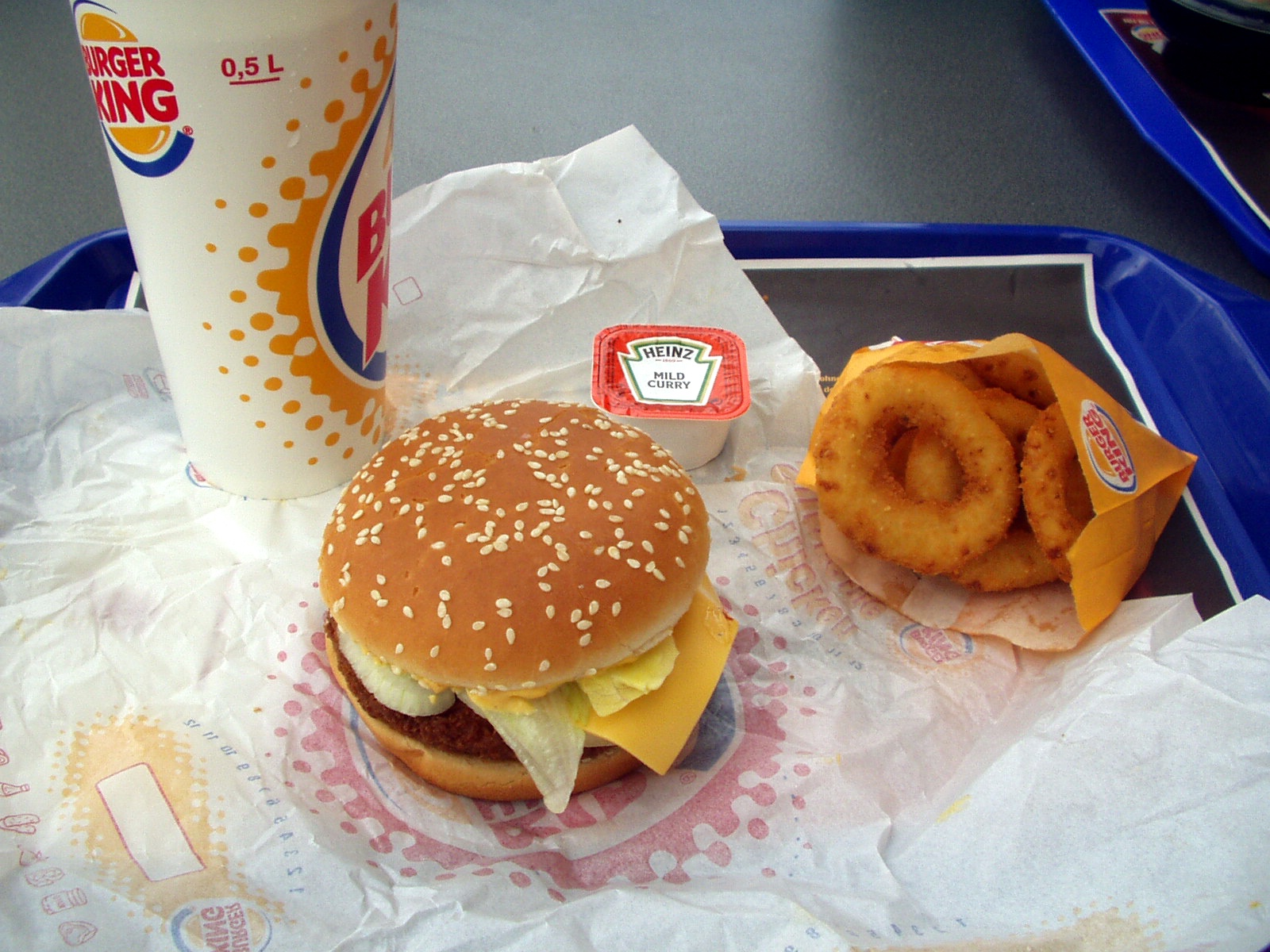
A Burger King Veggie combo meal, including a veggie burger, from Germany

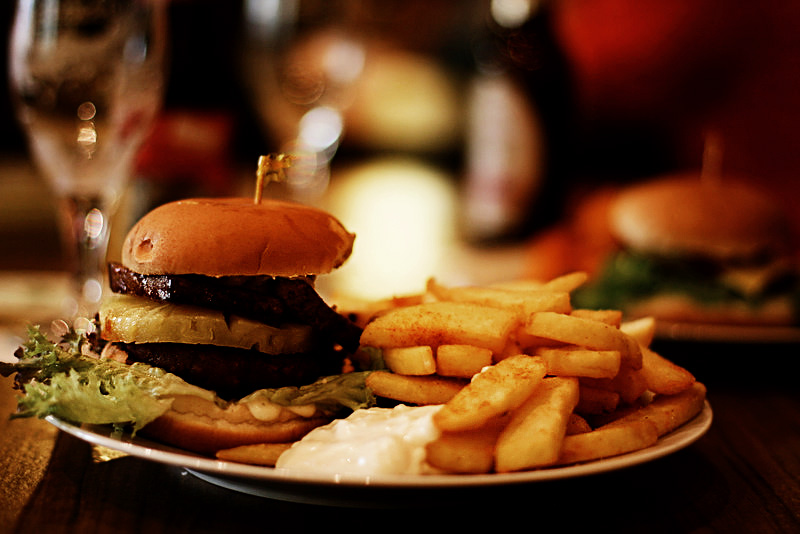
Vegan burger and French fries

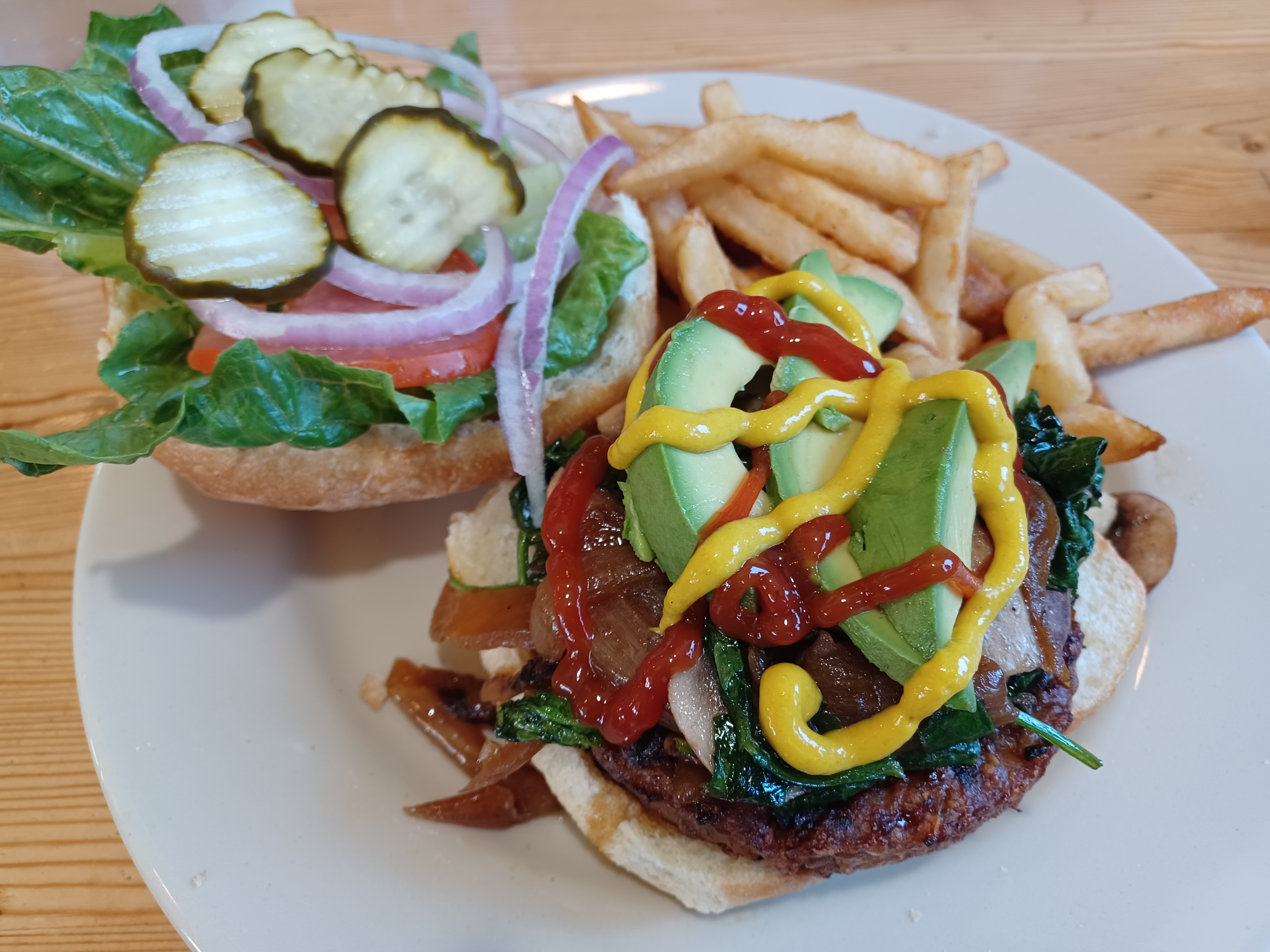
Vegan burger

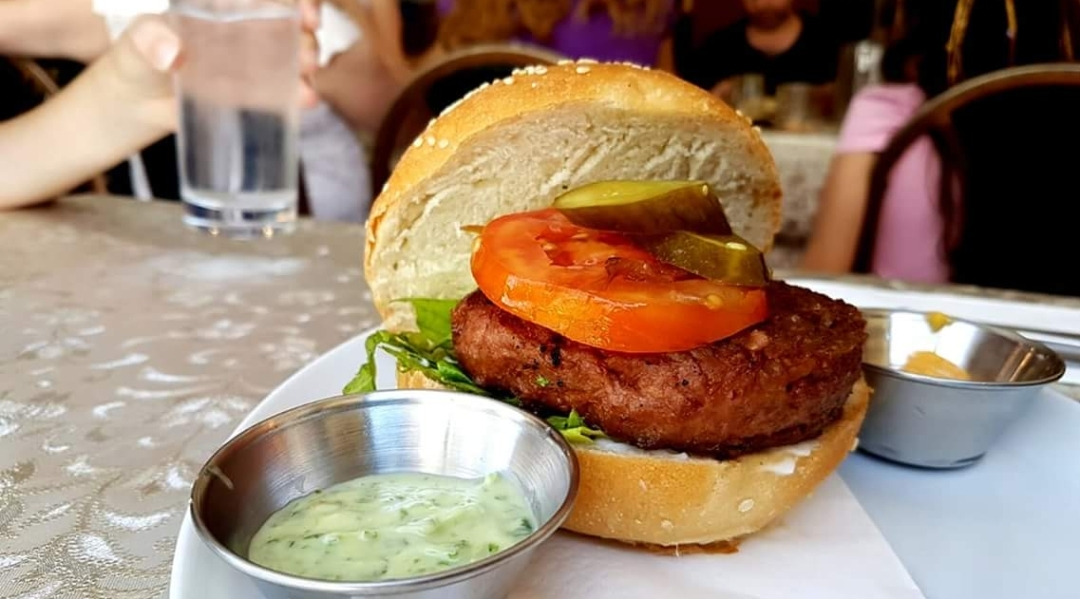
A Beyond Meat vegan burger

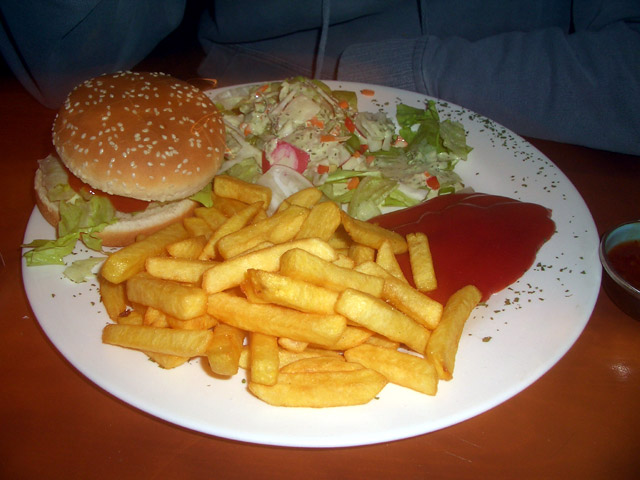
Order from a vegetarian deli: veggie burger with French fries and salad

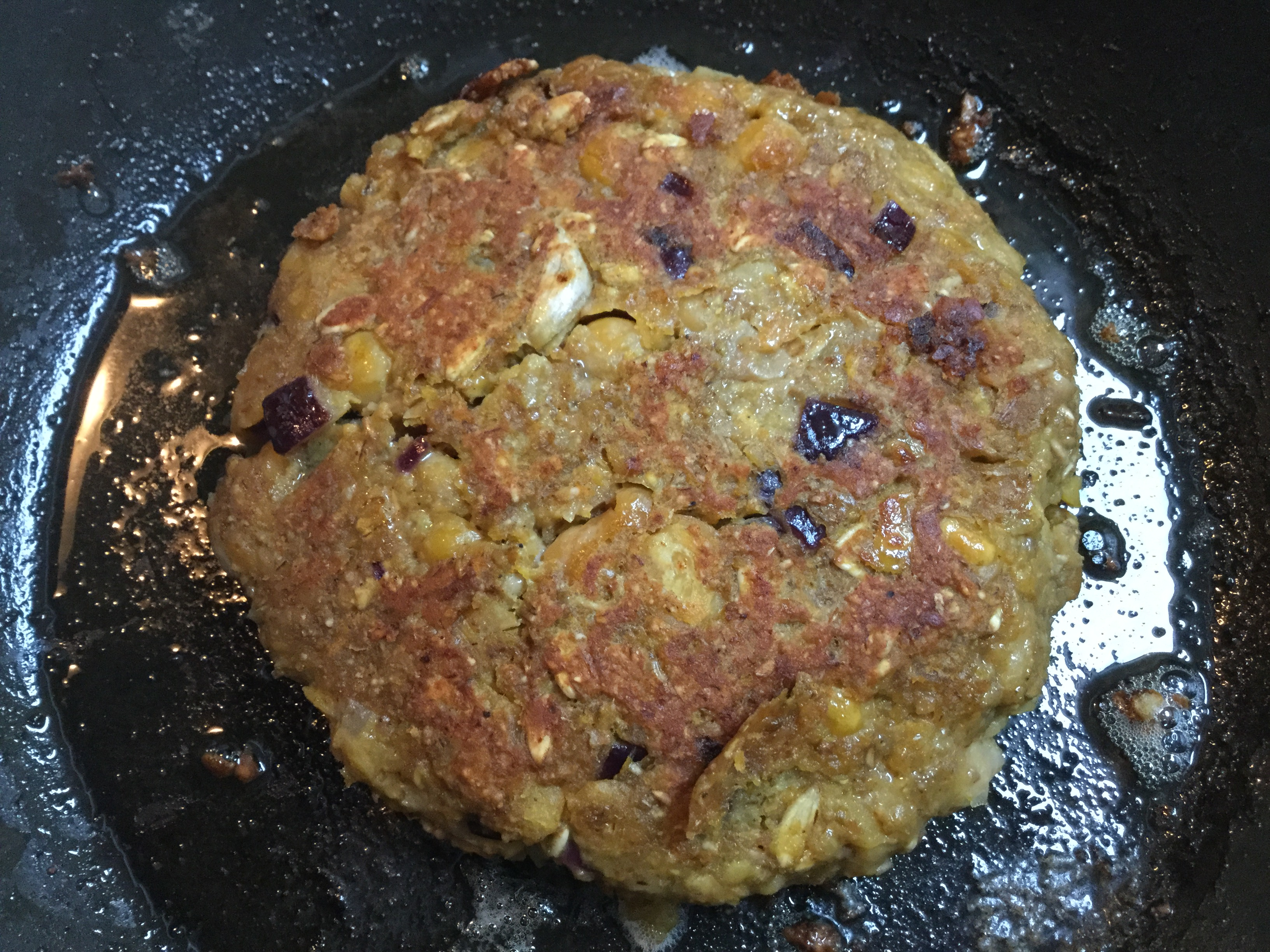
Mostly-veggie burger with the addition of one egg to better bind ingredients together

== See also ==
- Beyond Meat – Producer of plant-based meat substitutes
- BK Veggie – Fast food chain products
- Boca Burger – Veggie burger produced by Kraft Heinz
- Coconut burger
- Gardenburger – American brand of veggie burgers
- Impossible Burger – American meat substitutes manufacturer
- List of hamburgers
- List of meat substitutes
- List of sandwiches
- List of vegetable dishes
- Meat analog – Plant-based food made to resemble meat
- Morningstar Farms – Division of Kellanova
- Quorn – Meat substitute based on mycoprotein
- Sanitarium Health and Wellbeing Company – Business enterprise owned by the Seventh-day Adventist Church
- Soy pulp – Byproduct of soy milk and tofu production
- Tempeh burger – Type of vegetarian burger
- Vada pav – Indian fast food item
- Veganism – Non-usage of animal products
- Vegetarian cuisine – Food not including meat
- Vegetarianism – Abstaining from the consumption of meat
