= Ethan Brown (businessman) =

American businessman (born 1971)

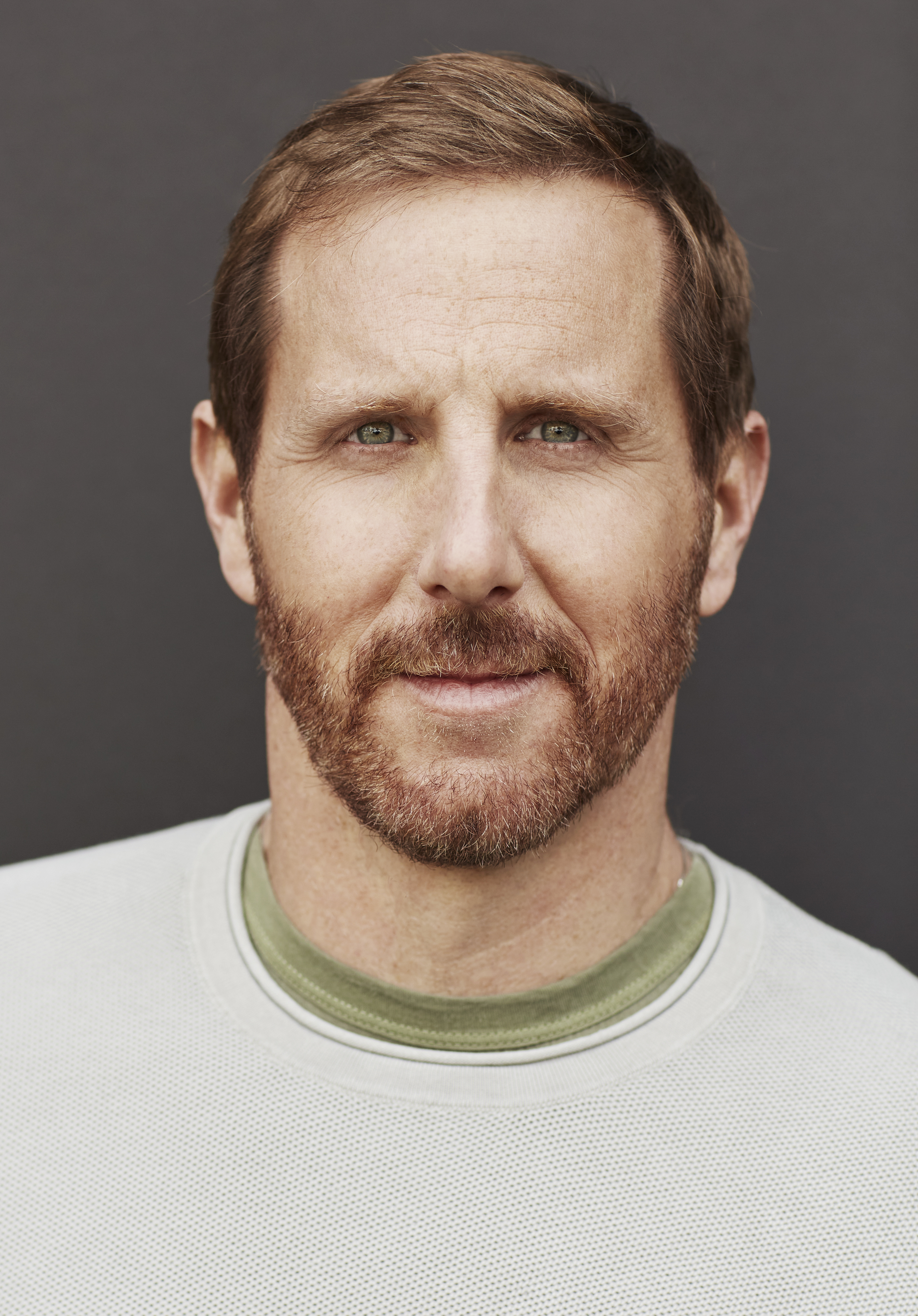
- Brown in 2021
- Born: Ethan Walden Brown; 1971 (age 54–55)
- Education: Connecticut College (BA); University of Maryland (MPP); Columbia University (MBA)
- Occupation: Businessperson
- Known for: CEO and founder of Beyond Meat
- Spouse: Tracy Brown
- Children: 2

Ethan Walden Brown (born 1971) is an American executive who is the founder, president and CEO of Beyond Meat. Before founding Beyond Meat, Brown worked on alternative energy and electricity grid restructuring at the National Governors Association's Center for Best Practices before joining fuel cell manufacturer Ballard Power Systems.

== Early life and education ==
Brown grew up in and near Washington, D.C., and also spent time during his childhood on his family's farm in Maryland. He is a graduate of George School (Newtown, PA).

Brown holds an undergraduate degree from Connecticut College, a Master of Public Policy degree from the University of Maryland School of Public Policy, a school founded by his father Dr. Peter G. Brown, and a Master of Business Administration from Columbia Business School in 2008.

== Career ==
=== Early career ===
Brown served as Vice Chairman of the Board at the National Hydrogen Association and Secretary of the U.S. Fuel Cell Council.

=== Beyond Meat ===
In 2009, Brown visited a research center at the University of Missouri that was looking for additional uses for soybeans, a major Missouri resource. There, he met researchers Fu-hung Hsieh and Harold Huff, who were working on technology to replicate the texture of meat using plant proteins. Brown acquired the technology license for the process, and founded Beyond Meat in 2009. On May 2, 2019, Brown rang the opening bell at Nasdaq when Beyond Meat went public under the symbol BYND. Brown is also a director of The PLANeT Partnership, Beyond Meat's joint venture with PepsiCo.

== Awards and recognition ==
In 2014, Brown was listed on Fast Company's Most Creative People in Business 1000. In 2017, Brown was named an Aspen Institute Henry Crown Fellow. In 2018, Brown was selected as one of the UNEP's Champions of the Earth in the category of science and innovation for his "work towards reducing our dependence on animal-based foods." In 2019, Brown was listed on Bloomberg Media's 50 Most Influential ranking. Brown was also named that year to Well+Good's "2020 Changemakers" list.

== Personal life ==
Brown is married to Tracy Brown, has two children, and lives in Southern California. He became a vegetarian in high school and is now vegan.
