= Tempeh burger =

Type of vegetarian burger

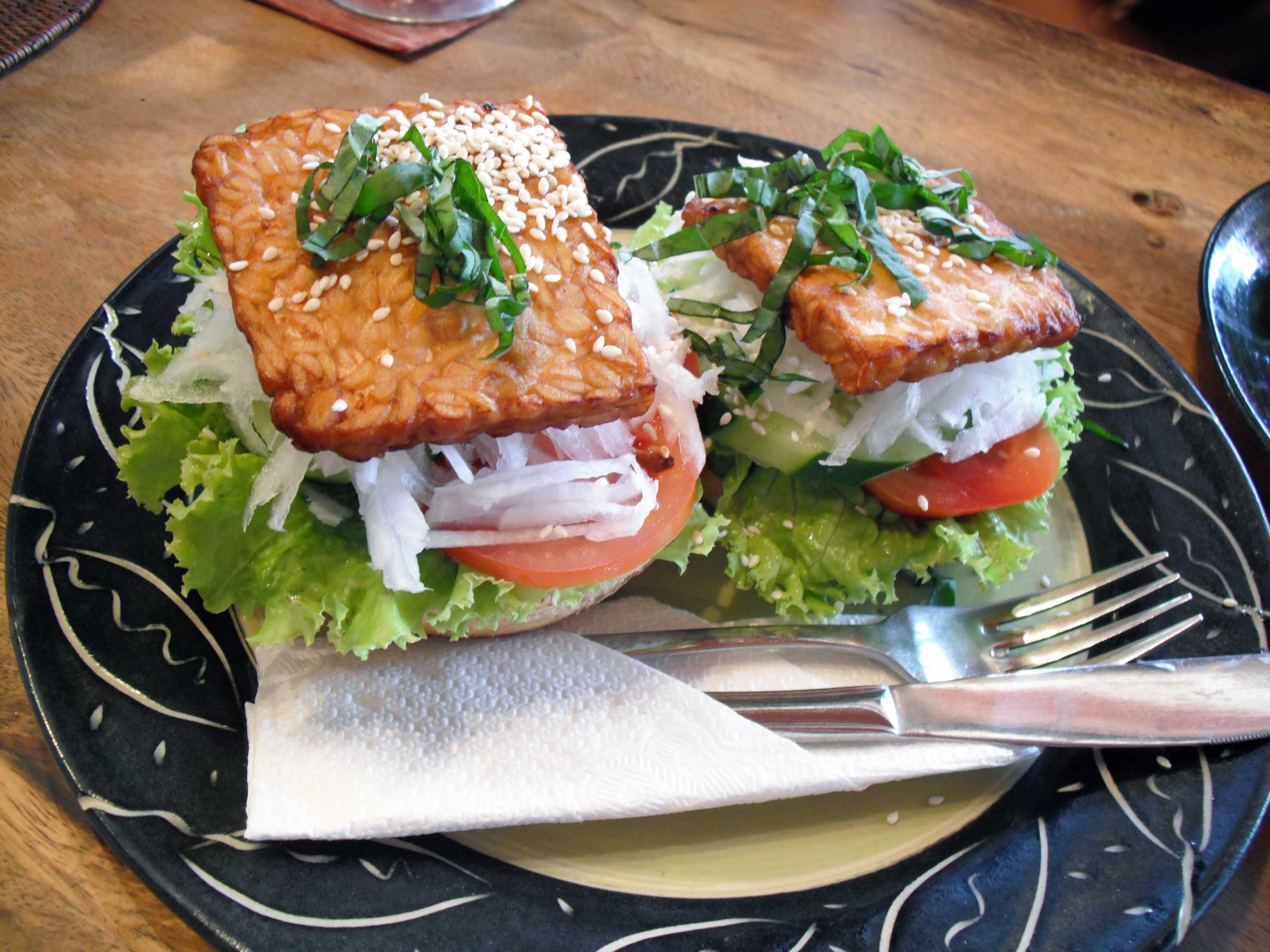
- Tempeh burger meal
- Course: Main course
- Serving temperature: Hot
- Main ingredients: Tempeh patty, bun, salad, sauces, seasonings, cheese (optional)

A tempeh burger is a vegetarian hamburger variant with tempeh (Indonesian fermented soybean cakes) as its main ingredient.

== Ingredients ==
This vegetarian fusion dish consisting of hamburger buns with patty made of ground tempeh and other mixture such as mushroom, onion and seasonings, served with vegetables such as lettuce, avocado and tomato, with vegan sauces and condiments, mayonnaise and cheese (optional).

Tempeh burger often uses tempeh as a meat substitutes to create vegan patties, in which ground meat was replaced by ground tempeh as protein source with other admixture and seasonings. However, there is another alternative of serving burger tempeh—by using two tempeh bars as hamburger buns to sandwich vegetables and vegan sauces.

== See also ==
- Fusion cuisine
- Hamburger
- Tempeh
