= Boca Burger =

Veggie burger produced by Kraft Heinz

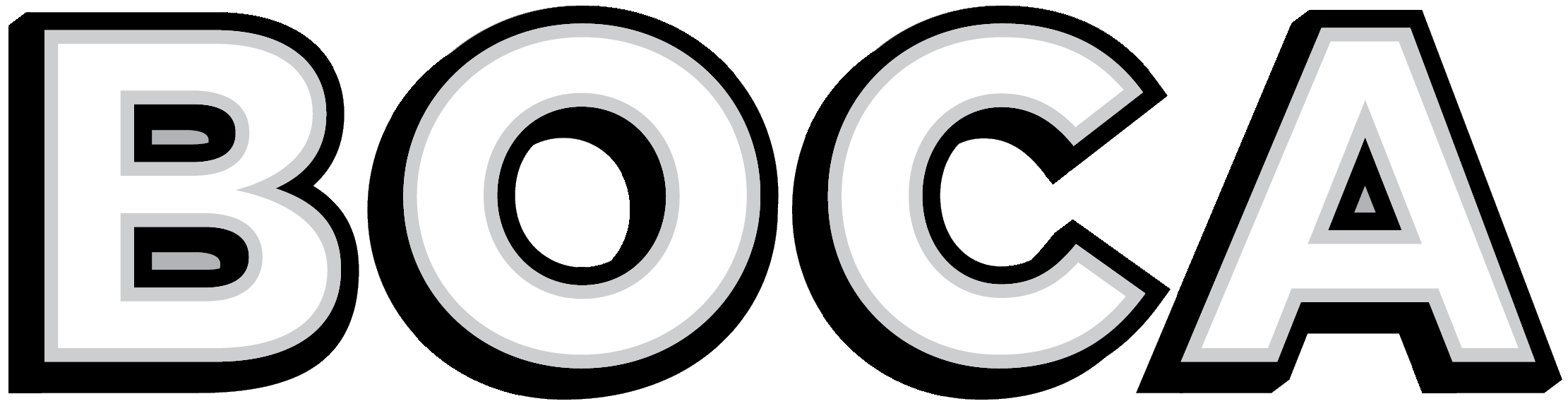

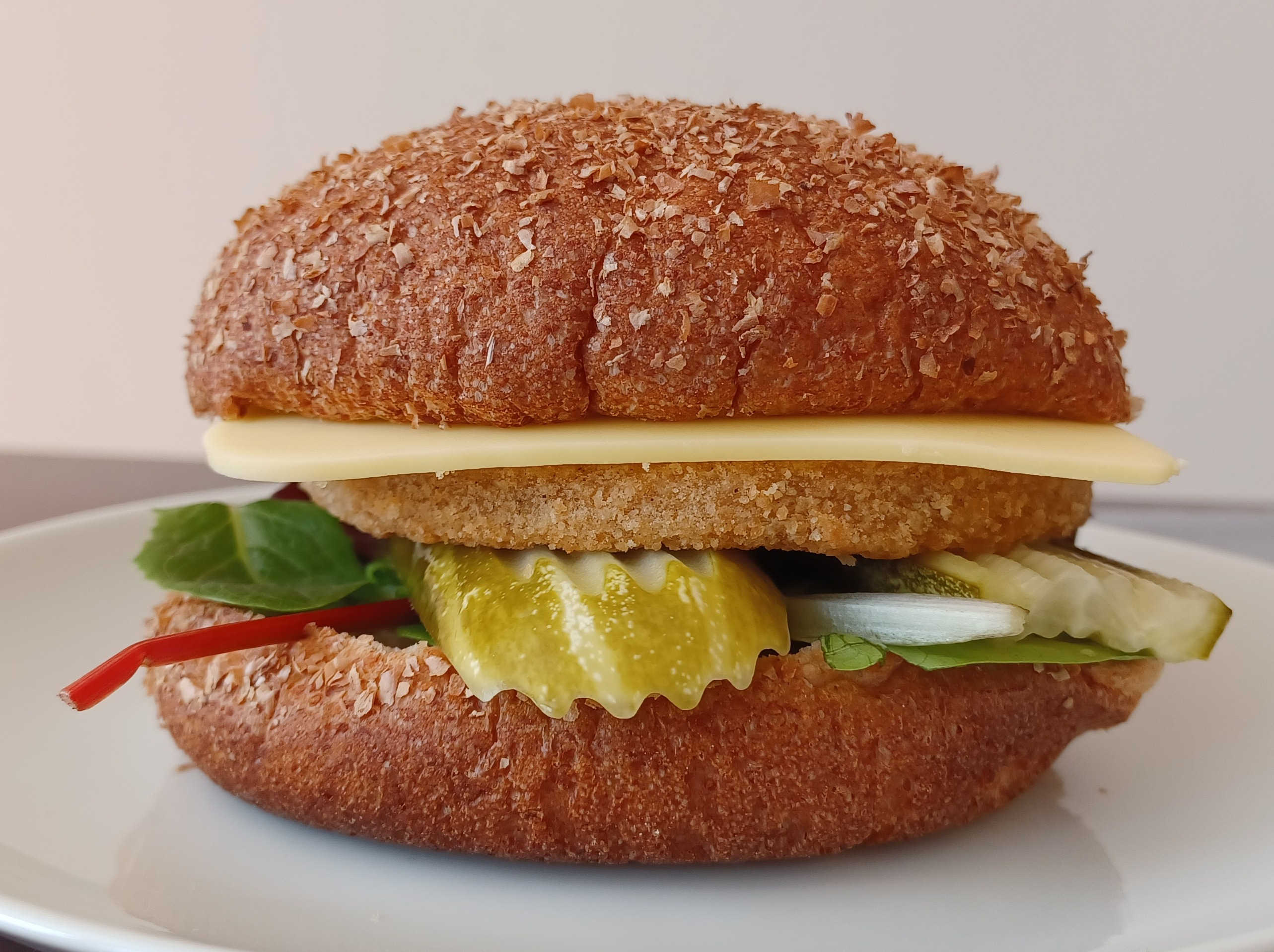
- An "original chick'n" veggie patty
- Product type: Veggie burger
- Current owner: Kraft Heinz
- Produced by: Kraft Foods
- Country: U.S.
- Introduced: 1979; 47 years ago
- Website: bocaburger.com

Boca Burger is a veggie burger produced by Kraft Heinz in Chicago, Illinois. Like all of Boca Foods' products, Boca Burgers serve as a meat alternative.

== History ==
The Boca Foods Company began in 1979 with the vegetarian "Sun Burger" product, as one of the first frozen, plant-based burger replacement products. Over the next decade, more burgers were introduced, as well as meatless versions of ground beef, chicken nuggets, various toppings on pizza, chili, lasagna, and sausages. Organic versions of some Boca products appeared in 2001.

Kraft Foods, the United States' largest packaged foods company, announced in early 2000 that it had reached agreement to purchase Boca Burger, Inc., a privately held manufacturer and marketer of soy-based meat alternatives. The announcement was made when Kraft Foods was represented by Gordon James and Clifford A. Wolff. The products are sold in the United States through retail grocery and club stores, natural foods stores and food service channels nationwide. Boca Burger, based in Chicago, Illinois, had 1999 revenues of about $40 million, almost double the previous year. By 2002, sales had grown to $70 million per year.

As of April 2020, Boca also offers meatless skillet meals.

== Awards ==
| Year | Award | Result |
|---|---|---|
| 2008 | PETA: The Golden Bun Awards | Won |

== See also ==
- List of meat substitutes
- List of vegetarian and vegan companies
- Veganism
- Veggie burger
