= McVeggie =

Vegetable hamburger sold by McDonald's

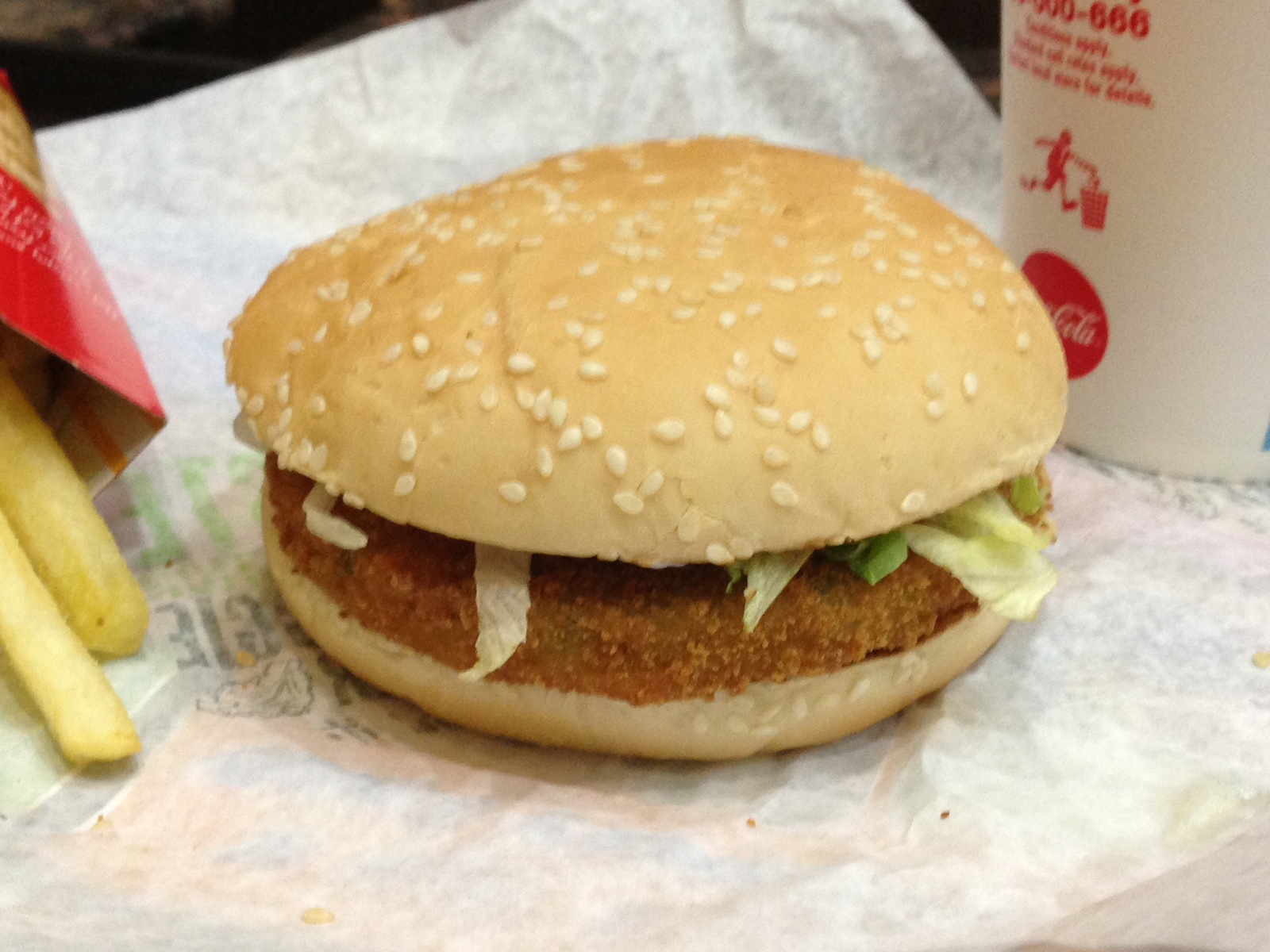
- McVeggie in India

Nutritional value per 100 g (3.5 oz)
- Energy: 400 kcal (1,700 kJ)
- Carbohydrates: 57 g
- Fat: 14 g
- Protein: 10 g
Vitamins and minerals
Minerals	Quantity %DV^{†}
Sodium	31% 710 mg
- Other constituents: Quantity
- Cholesterol: 2.5 mg
- ^{†}Percentages estimated using US recommendations for adults. Source: Nutrition values for the Indian McVeggie.

The McVeggie is a veggie burger sold by the American multinational fast food restaurant chain McDonald's. It was introduced in 2012 in India when McDonald's opened its first vegetarian-only restaurant in the country.

== Description ==
The vegetarian-based burger contains a battered and breaded patty which is made of peas, corn, carrots, green beans, onions, potatoes, rice and spices, served in a sesame toasted bun with eggless mayonnaise and lettuce.

== History ==
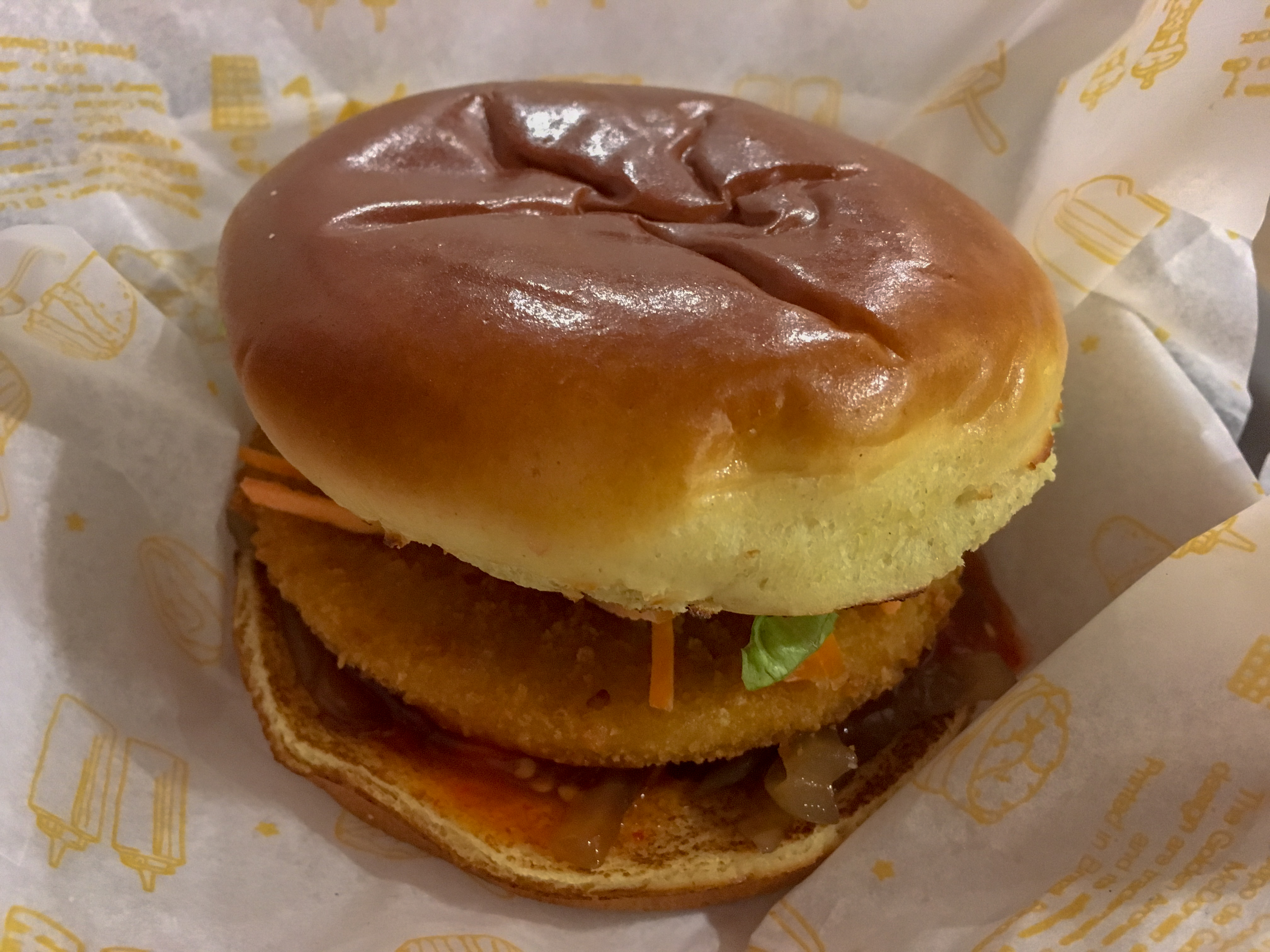
McVeggie in Brazil in 2018

Because of the widespread populations practicing vegetarianism in India, in 2012 McDonald's opened its first vegetarian-only restaurant and served McVeggie. They also serve it in Hong Kong, Germany in February 2010, South Australia in May 2019, Finland and Sweden in 2017, Belgium and Greece, Malaysia, Portugal in 2016, Switzerland, in New Zealand as of December 2019, and in Canada as of September 2025.

In Sweden and Portugal, McVeggie was replaced by the McPlant in 2022, but it didn't last in either country. By 2024, McDonald's reintroduced the McVeggie in Portugal.

A plant-based Beyond Meat burger was tested at 52 locations in Canada from 2019 to 2020 called the Plant, Lettuce, Tomato (PLT). It was considered to be unsuccessful and discontinued. The McVeggie was then introduced to test markets in March 2025, with a different formulation than the one used in other countries. As a result of the PLT's failure, the Canadian McVeggie was designed to be vegetable-based rather than mimicking meat, with "chunky greenery". The sandwich is paired with lettuce, can be ordered with either mayonnaise or habanero sauce, and is fried in the same fryer vat used for fish. The McVeggie became a permanent menu item in September 2025.

== Reception ==
The McVeggie has received mixed reviews. While the trend meat eaters to eat more "flexitarian" was successful, according to the New Zealand Vegetarian Society, the offer of a McVeggie was not quite vegetarian and it represented a "missed opportunity". McDonald's website ended up with them saying the burger is "Not vegetarian due to our cooking method". When the New Zealand Vegetarian Society shared a post on Facebook about the McVeggie for people's opinion, multiple user complained and claimed it misleading, and expressed their annoyance that they are unable to consume the burger as it was contaminated with meat. While some people said that they feel the burger is a tiny step in the right direction, some of them described it as "disappointing", and some also said that "They have made completely the wrong call, the world is moving towards plant-based eating and this is so off the mark, it's almost funny".

== See also ==
- Impossible Whopper
- McPlant
- McVegan
