= McChurch =

Derogatory term for a consumerist or commercialist church

McChurch is a McWord used to suggest that a particular church has a strong element of entertainment, consumerism or commercialism which obscures its religious aspects. The term is sometimes used as a derogatory synonym for megachurch.

== Definitions ==
The precise origins of the term McChurch are unclear, dating back to at least the early 1990s. Prominent media sources using the term include:

- Robert McClory's 1992 article "Superchurch", published in the U.S. alternative newsweekly The Chicago Reader. This article describes Willow Creek Community Church, a megachurch in South Barrington, Illinois as a McChurch.
- Charles Colson's 1994 book The Body, which describes a McChurch that the author attended in Japan. The author also uses the term "Hot Tub Religion" to express the same sentiment.
- Dan Schaeffer's article "McChurch" in the 2002 issue of the Christian-themed Plain Truth Magazine. Schaeffer states that many Christian churches have "gone Las Vegas" in order to grow their congregations.
- Maine State Representative Stan Moody's 2006 book McChurched which describes a pervasive consumerism in the evangelical Christian community. Moody, a Democrat, attributes this sentiment to the incorporation of Republican pro-capitalist influence into the religious community.
- Robert Lanham's 2006 book The Sinner's Guide to the Evangelical Right uses the term among others, in describing Megachurches throughout its pages.

While precise definitions of a McChurch also differ, McClory attempted to list the following common elements, which he found at Willow Creek and other similar churches:

- Presentations and sermons with an emphasis on entertainment, use of modern theatrical technology, and a heavy "feel-good" tone, at the expense of religious experiences such as guilt and self-sacrifice. McClory described the overall sermon content of such churches as "the basic salvation message in contemporary dress and without any of the bitter side effects".
- The incorporation of revenue-generating businesses within the main church building. This included bookstores, nurseries and day-care centers, gyms, and cafeterias.
- Majority of attendance and offerings come from meetings that, according to the church's own theology, are not valid church services. For example, the pastor of Willow Creek, Bill Hybels, emphasized that his popular weekend and Sunday services (attendance at the time of the article, 16,000) are "not intended as worship in any formal sense", and are officially designated as informal meetings to attract the "unchurched". The church held its official services (attendance, 4,500) on Wednesday and Thursday nights.
- Primarily located in suburban and exurban areas, ostensibly to attract higher-class attendees and boost donations. McClory noted that Willow Creek is located in a remote, wooded area, and all attendees required an automobile to attend. He also reported that the church's attendees are almost all drawn from the surrounding upper-class subdivisions of northwest Chicago suburbs.
- Near-complete lack of religious symbols in and outside the church. Except for a cross-shaped cork bulletin board, no religious symbols could be found either in or around the Willow Creek complex. Likewise, traditional church elements were replaced (e.g., instead of pews, attendees sat in cushioned movie-theater chairs).

== Popular culture references ==
- The Simpsons episode "She of Little Faith"
- King of the Hill episode "Church Hopping"
- Bordertown episode "Megachurch"
