= McPlant =

McDonald's vegetarian burger

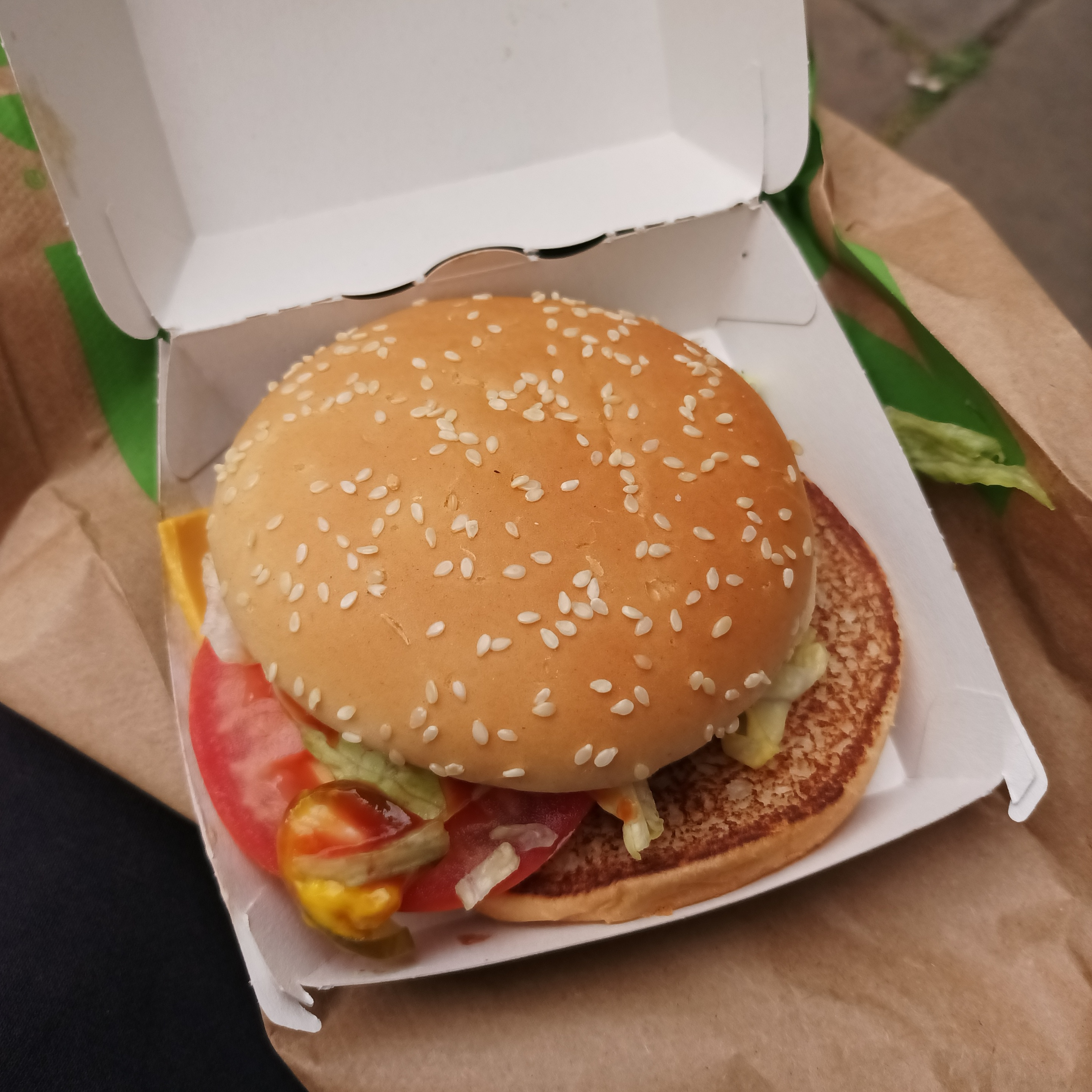
- The McPlant in its box

Nutritional value per 1 sandwich
- Energy: 510 kcal (2,100 kJ)
- Carbohydrates: 45g
- Sugars: 11g
- Dietary fiber: 5g
- Fat: 27g
- Saturated: 8g
- Protein: 22g
Vitamins and minerals
Minerals	Quantity %DV^{†}
Sodium	29% 670 mg
- Other constituents: Quantity
- Cholesterol: 25mg
- ^{†}Percentages estimated using US recommendations for adults.

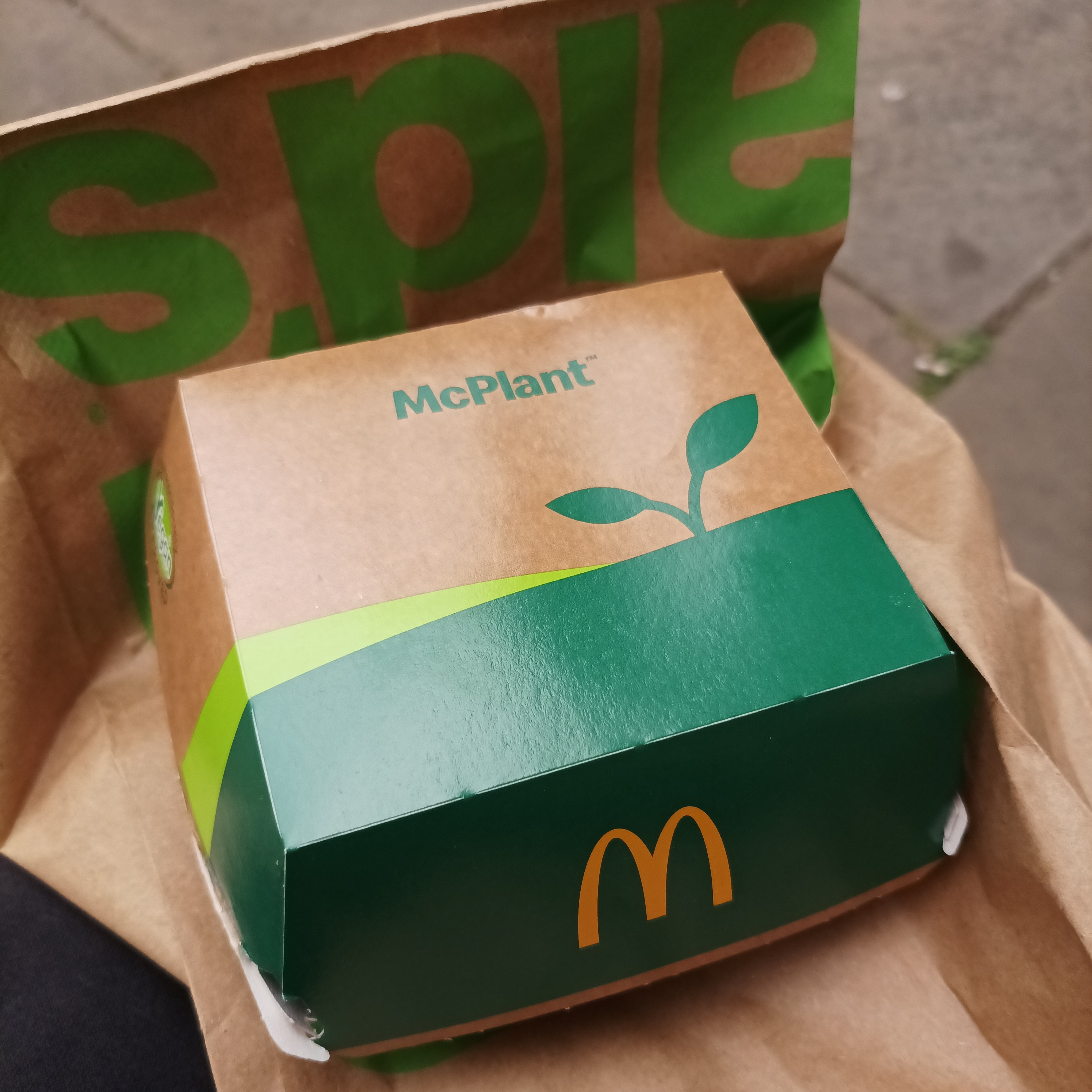
The McPlant's packaging as it is in the United Kingdom

The McPlant is a vegetarian (and in some regions vegan) burger sold by the American multinational fast food chain McDonald's in several European countries. In 2021, McDonald's partnered with Beyond Meat, a Los Angeles–based producer of plant-based meat substitutes, to create the McPlant platform. It features a plant-based meat alternative burger patty made from plant ingredients such as potatoes, peas and rice.

The McPlant was launched in the United Kingdom in January 2022, after tests in October 2021. It is also available in Ireland and Slovenia. In both the United Kingdom and Ireland, the burger is vegan due to the use of vegan sandwich sauce and a vegan cheese alternative, it is also cooked in an oven separately from meat products using different utensils and is approved by the Vegetarian Society. The McPlant is also sold in a non-vegan variant (with cheese and egg-based mayonnaise) in Austria, Germany, and Portugal, as well as in the Netherlands with cheese and a vegan sandwich sauce. When the McPlant was launched in Germany in February 2023, it replaced the Fresh Vegan TS burger, leading to some criticism from vegan customers. McDonald's Germany targets flexitarians and lists all ingredients of the burgers. In Germany an additional McPlant Tomato Chargrill became a permanent menu item after a collaboration with two members of the band Tokio Hotel in 2024. The McPlant was removed from the menu in Austria in July 2025 and in Germany in October 2025, with McDonalds citing "low demand."

In January 2023, McDonald's launched the Double McPlant with two patties in the United Kingdom and Ireland. In Austria, McDonald's also sells the McPlant Steakhouse, a variant of the burger with steakhouse sauce. In Germany and France, it also sells McPlant Nuggets made from wheat and pea protein. The full list of ingredients is not disclosed. In Germany, McPlant nuggets are fried in the same fryers as chicken McNuggets and thus might not be vegan or vegetarian either. McDonalds Germany lists the ingredients, the nuggets are based on wheat and pea protein.

In several other countries, the McPlant was tested but not introduced in the permanent menu. The first tests occurred in Sweden and Denmark between January and April 2021. In the United States, the product was initially tested in November 2021, with expanded tests in California and Texas from February 2022. The trial run of the McPlant in the United States was discontinued in August 2022, reportedly due to low sales. From July until November 2022, the McPlant was served in Victoria, Australia, as a limited run item.

== See also ==
- McVeggie
- McVegan
- The Impossible Whopper, by Burger King
