= McVegan =

Vegan hamburger sold by McDonald's

McVegan is a veggie burger sold by the fast-food restaurant chain McDonald's. In 2017, McDonald partnered with the Swedish food company Orkla to create a plant-based patty inside a small steel kitchen in Malmö, where they began the creation of the product. In Germany, the chain's vegan burger is sold as the Big Vegan TS.

== Product description ==
The burger is made of a soy patty, bun, tomatoes, lettuce, pickle, onion, ketchup, mustard, oil and an egg-less sandwich sauce.

== History ==
In 2017, due to a petition which was signed by 220,000 people asking McDonald's for a plant-based food and an increase in US flexitarian foods which are vegan, McDonald's decided to introduce a plant-based food on the menu. It was also introduced to compete with Burger King's Impossible Whopper, and also depicted the competition as Burger wars as the demand of plant-based protein is increasing, and has become a trend. The company also made the food a permanent product on the menu in Sweden and Finland. Since the release of the McVegan, McDonald's owner and operator said that “Customers have expressed interest in items from McDonald’s restaurants located in India and we’re excited to offer them the opportunity to try the long time vegetarian favorite”. The product was also made to decrease the slaughter of animals such as chickens. The product was first tested in Finland and eventually spread to more countries, after being successful there. For instance, it was released in Germany in April 2019.

== Reception ==
The burger was well received by vegan customers in Sweden and Finland, and PETA praised McDonald's for accepting "how massively popular animal-friendly foods are". In a taste test review of the product's launch in Finland, Business Insider found the burger "quite neutral, with a good texture" and described it as "a very decent burger", while noting that it was late in competing with similar vegan products from other companies in Nordic countries. A Finnish reviewer for the British Metro wrote that the McVegan burger "looked and tasted like a classic McDonald's burger".

== See also ==
- Impossible Whopper
- McPlant
- McVeggie
