= McArabia =

Pita bread sandwich sold by McDonald's

- A chicken McArabia in Dubai (2024)

Nutritional value per 1 sandwich
- Energy: 590.0 kcal (2,469 kJ)
- Carbohydrates: 47.0 g
- Sugars: 4.0 g
- Dietary fiber: 4.0 g
- Fat: 33.0 g
- Saturated: 9.6 g
- Trans: 0.2 g
- Protein: 26.0 g
Vitamins and minerals
Minerals	Quantity %DV^{†}
Calcium	2% 20.0 mg
Iron	0% 0 mg
Sodium	37% 860.0 mg
- ^{†}Percentages estimated using US recommendations for adults.

The McArabia is a pita bread sandwich available at all McDonald's outlets in Arab countries and Pakistan. It is known as the Grilled Chicken foldover in Singapore, Malaysia and South Africa, as McOriental in Spain, France and the Netherlands, the McTurco in Turkey, Greek Mac in Greece, Cyprus and Russia (limited time offer), and as the McKebab in Israel. The sandwich was originally made to meet West Asian tastes.

== History ==
The Sandwich was introduced as the Greek Mac in 2001 in Greece.

The McArabia was introduced in Saudi Arabia and UAE in March 2003 in response to a sharp fall of profits in 2002, and declared a permanent product, due to boycotts on American brands and restaurants over the war in Iraq and claims that the ingredients were not from local vendors. The first version of the sandwich used grilled chicken with pita bread which was imported from the UK for the first week, then was switched to local bakers. In 2004, the Kofta variant was added, while in 2005, the sandwich was introduced in Malaysia and a limited spicy beef variant in 2006.

== Product description and variants ==
- McArabia: Grilled chicken, which contains two grilled chicken patties with tomatoes, lettuce and topped with garlic sauce wrapped in pita bread served in the UAE, KSA, Kuwait, Qatar, Oman, Lebanon, Morocco, Pakistan (the only non-Arab country), and Bahrain. It was served in Malaysia for a limited time in April 2020 and April 2022 as the Grilled Chicken Foldover.
- McArabia Grilled Kofta: served with lettuce, tomatoes, onions, and garlic mayonnaise in addition to two patties of grilled kofta, all in an Arabic-style pita bread, was served in Egypt and also withdrawn from other countries in early years; it was available as a limited-time sandwich in September 2014, served in Malaysia in April 2022 as the Beef Foldover with 2 sauce variants garlic and special sauce.
- McArabia Crispy Chicken: a variant that replaces the grilled chicken, was available September 2014.
- McArabia Veggie: a variant with a plant-based patty was available in Kuwait around September 2014.
- McArabia Sujuk: a variant that replaces the kofta and was available in the UAE in September 2014.
- McArabia Saveur Tagine was a variant that had cumin bread, basil sauce, onions, cumin and coriander, combined with grilled vegetables (tomatoes, grilled red and yellow peppers), with a spicy basil sauce. It was only available in Morocco in April 2009.
- McArabia Saveur Badinjan was a variant that had cumin bread and grilled vegetables consisting of eggplants, pepper and tomatoes. The sandwich was only available in Morocco in April 2009.
- Crispy Fish Foldover: contains tomatoes, white onion, lettuce and a special sauce resembling Sriracha mayo, over a large crispy fish fillet in pita bread. Served in Malaysia for a limited time in April 2020.
- Mini McArabia, also known As P'tit McArabia, was a variant that was similar to the McArabia; its ingredients and price were cut in half from the regular McArabia, making it have one single patty and fewer vegetables. Its patty variants were Sujuk and Grilled Chicken.
- McArabia Halloumi is a breakfast item consisting of pita bread that had a lightly grilled Halloumi cheese accompanied by lettuce, tomatoes and black olives.
