= Beyond Meat =

Producer of plant-based meat substitutes

Beyond Meat, Inc.

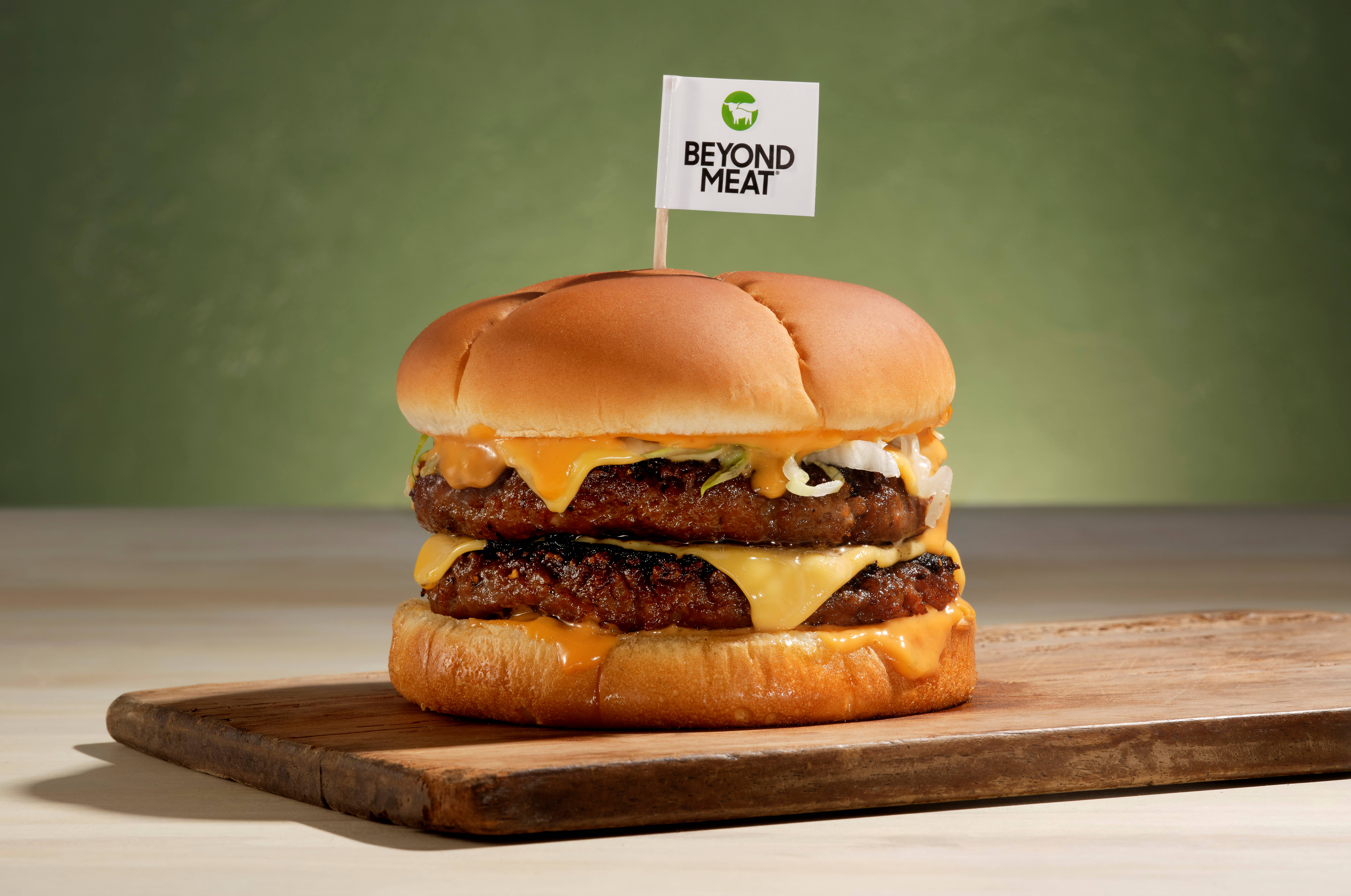
- A Beyond Meat burger
- Type: Public
- Traded as: Nasdaq: BYND; Russell 2000 component
- Industry: Food
- Founded: 2009; 17 years ago
- Founder: Ethan Brown
- Headquarters: El Segundo, California, U.S.
- Revenue: ▼US$326 million (2024)
- Net income: ▲ -US$160 million (2024)
- Total assets: ▼US$678 million (2024)
- Total equity: ▼ -US$601 million (2024)
- Owner: Ethan Brown (4.6%)
- Number of employees: 754 full-time employees and 54 contract workers (2024)
- Website: beyondmeat.com

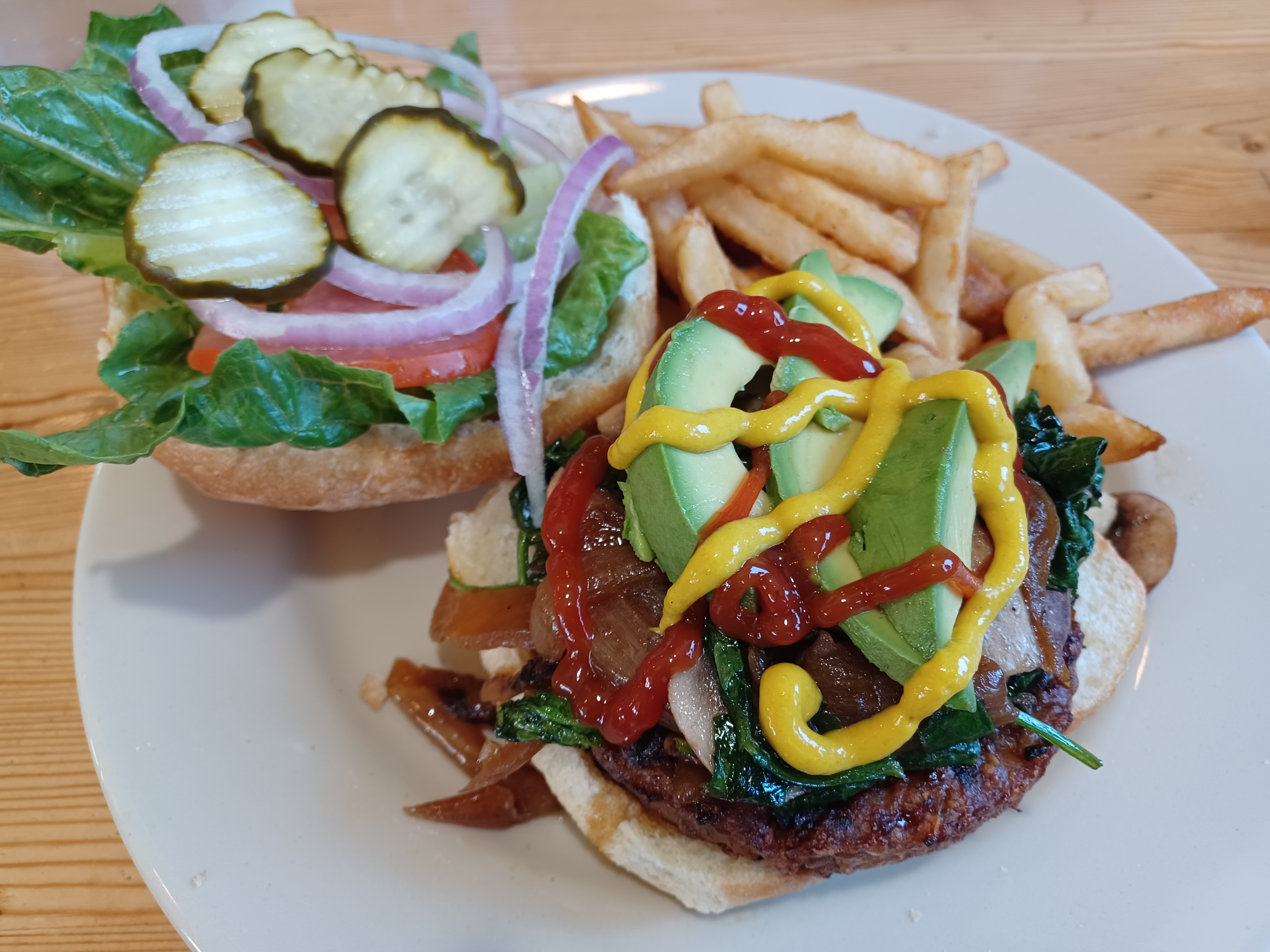
A Beyond burger served at a restaurant in Tuolumne County, California, United States

Beyond Meat, Inc., branded as Beyond, is a producer of plant-based meat alternatives founded in 2009 by Ethan Brown. The company's products were first launched in the United States in 2012.

Beyond Meat's signature product is its plant-based beef 'Beyond Burger'. It also makes plant-based chicken and pork products. The primary ingredient in the company's products is pea protein, supplied by Roquette Frères.

As of December 2024, the company's products were available at 27,000 retail outlets in the United States, 38,000 retail outlets internationally, 38,000 foodservice outlets in the United States, and 26,000 foodservice outlets internationally. The company's products are available in 65 countries worldwide.

== History ==
=== Founding ===
The company was founded in 2009 by Ethan Brown to mitigate climate change. Brown licensed technology from two University of Missouri professors, Fu-hung Hsieh and Harold Huff, who had been developing their meatless protein since the 1980s.

Beyond Meat launched its first product, Beyond Chicken Strips (originally called "Chicken-Free Strips"), at Whole Foods Market in 2012 and expanded nationally in 2013. In 2014, Beyond Meat developed its first plant-based beef product, Beyond Beef Crumbles. That same year, it announced that it had begun development of a new product emulating a beef burger.

=== Financing and revenues ===
Between 2013 and 2016, the company received venture funding from GreatPoint Ventures, Kleiner Perkins, Obvious Corporation, Bill Gates, Biz Stone, the Humane Society and Tyson Foods.

By 2018, Beyond Meat had raised US$72 million in venture financing.

In May 2019, Beyond Meat became a public company via an initial public offering on the Nasdaq, raising $240 million. It was the first plant-based meat alternative company to became a public company. On the day of its IPO, the company's stock price surged 163%, the best-performing public offering by a major U.S. company since 2000, during the dot-com bubble.

By 2020, celebrity and athlete investors included Leonardo DiCaprio, Jessica Chastain, Mark Rober, Snoop Dogg, Liza Koshy, Chris Paul, Kyrie Irving, and DeAndre Hopkins.

The company's largest customer is Dot Foods, accounting for 12% of revenue in 2024.

==== Layoffs ====
In October 2022, the company announced layoffs of 19% of its staff, or approximately 200 employees, due to revenue declines.

In November 2023, Beyond Meat announced additional layoffs after a 9% decline in sales.

In February 2025, the company halted operations in China and announced additional layoffs. In August 2025, the company announced an additional 44 layoffs, or 6% of its workforce.

== Products ==
=== Plant-based beef ===
==== Beyond Burger (2016–present) ====
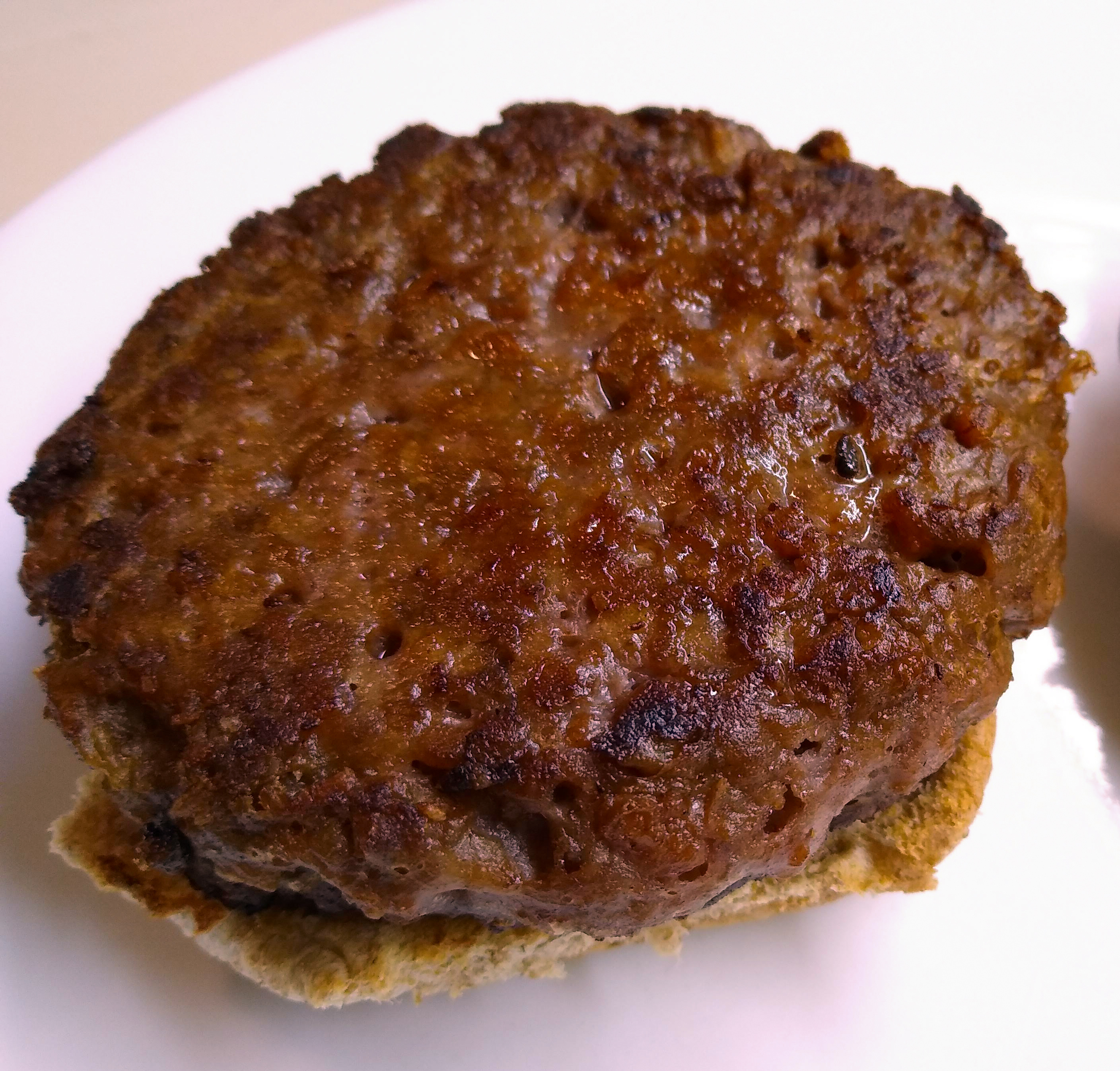
Beyond Burger patty on a bun, cooked

In May 2016, Beyond Meat launched its signature product, the 'Beyond Burger' patty.

In 2019, the company launched its 'Beyond Burger 2.0', which was a 'meatier' design with less saturated fat than the original product. In 2021, this was followed by its 'Beyond Burger 3.0', which further reduced its fat and calorie content whilst maintaining the same amount of protein.

In 2024, Beyond Meat changed its recipe to achieve a healthier 'Beyond Meat IV'. This updated recipe replaced the canola oil and coconut oil with avocado oil.

===== Ingredients =====
The Beyond Burger patty is made from pea protein isolates, rice protein, red lentil protein, avocado oil, potato starch, pea starch, faba bean extract, apple extract, and pomegranate powder. Its blood-color and ability to "bleed" comes from the addition of red beet juice.

===== Patty variants =====
In 2023, Beyond introduced a 'smashable' version of their Beyond Burger patty, which is thinner and can be cooked quickly to make a smash burger. That same year, the company also introduced a 'stackable' version of the patty.

==== Beyond Mince (2021–present) ====
In 2021, the Beyond range in the UK expanded to include 'Beyond Mince;.

==== Beyond Steak (2022–present) ====
In 2022, Beyond launched plant-based beefsteak slices called 'Beyond Steak', which are made mainly of fava bean protein. TIME magazine named it as one of the Best Inventions of 2022.

In 2025, Beyond added two new pre-seasoned flavours of Beyond Steak, chimichurri and Korean BBQ-style.

=== Plant-based pork ===
==== Beyond Sausage (2017–present) ====
In December 2017, the company announced a plant-based pork sausage called 'Beyond Sausage'. This launched the following year and was named by TIME Magazine as one of the Best Inventions of 2018.

The three flavours of Beyond Sausage are 'Brat' (bratwurst), 'Hot Italian', and 'Sweet Italian'. They are made primarily of pea protein, rice, fava beans, potato starch, and coconut oil.

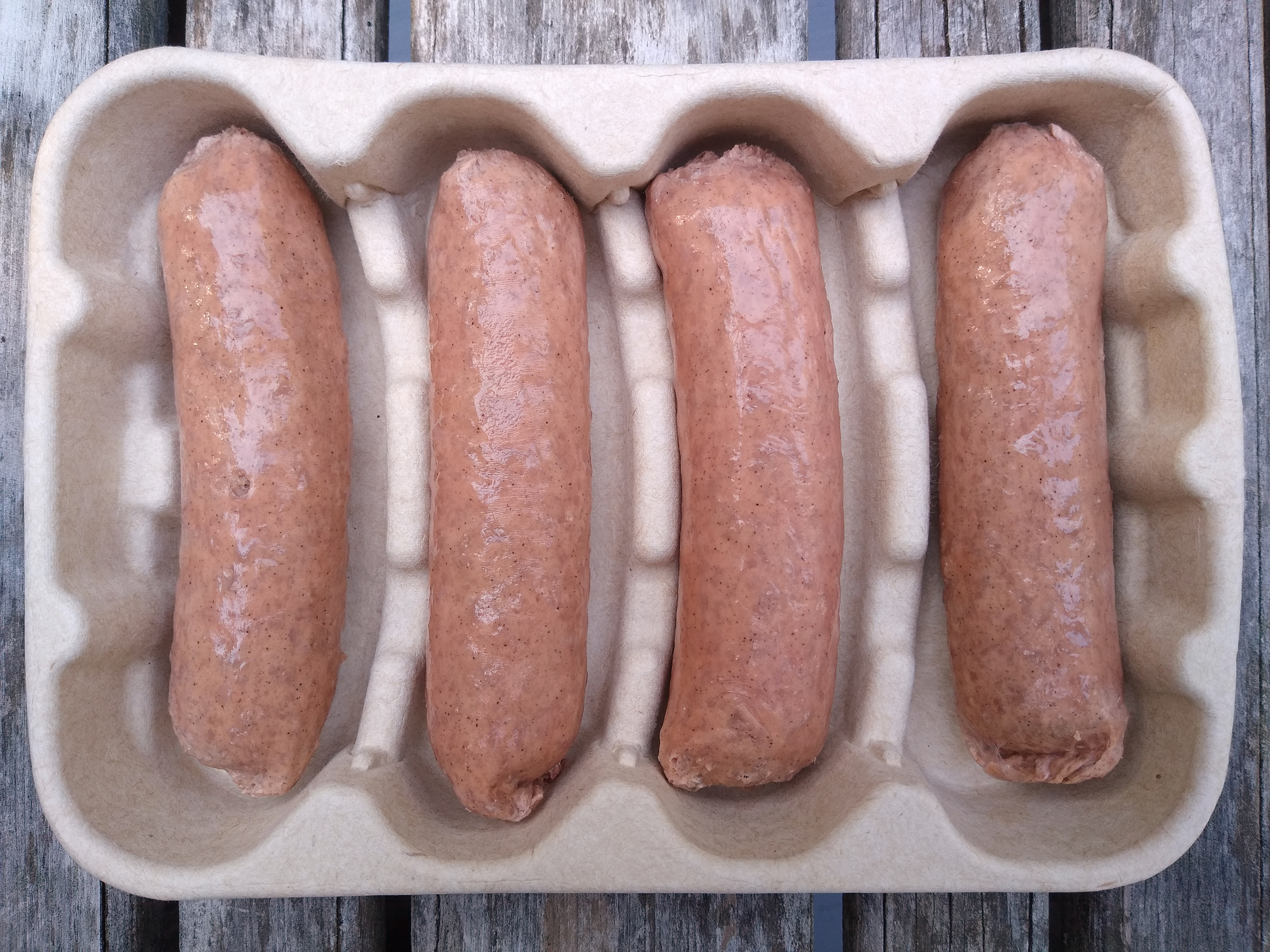
Beyond Sausage, raw

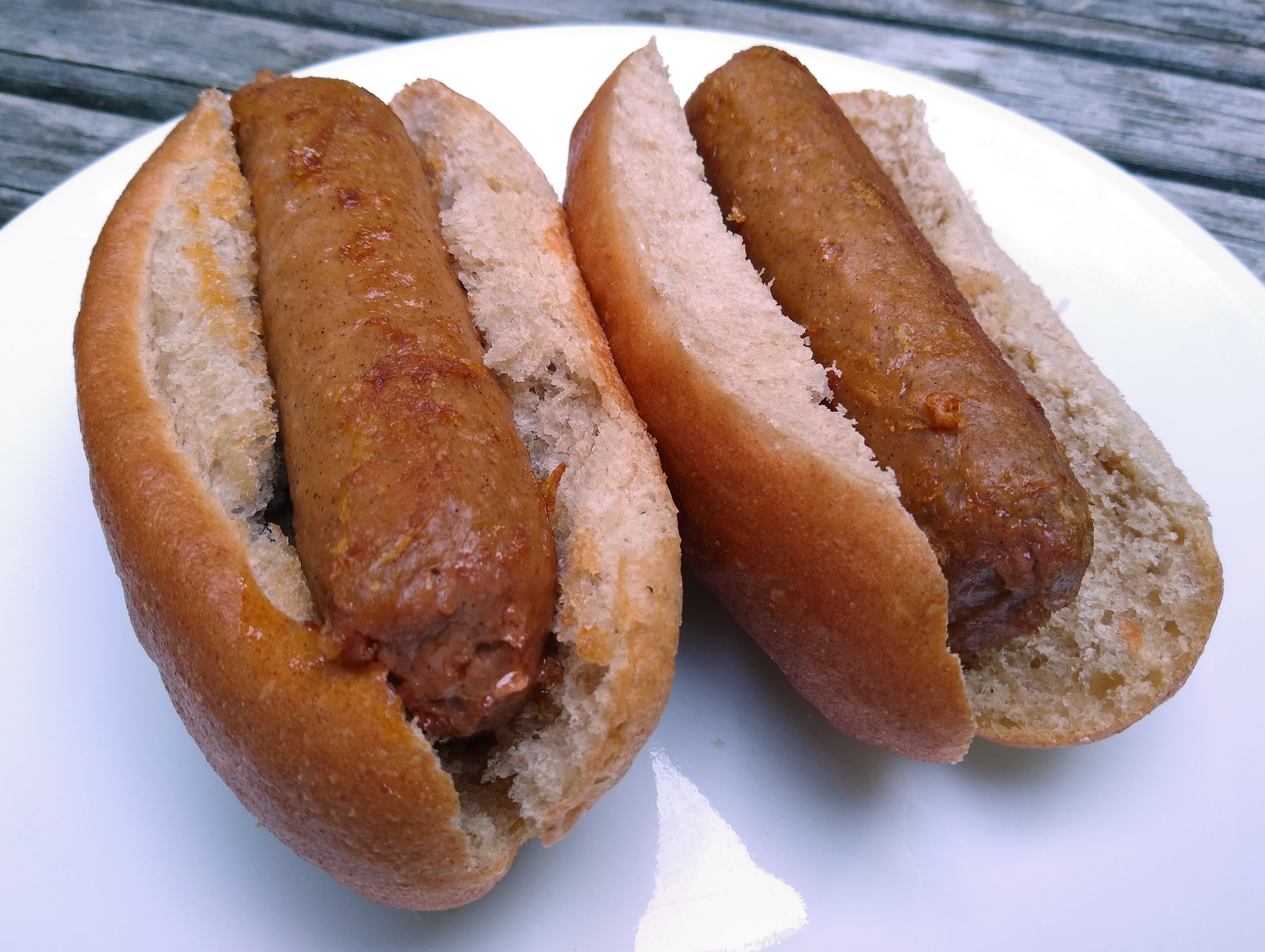
Beyond Sausage, cooked

===== Beyond Breakfast Sausage =====
In March 2020, Beyond released its ‘Beyond Breakfast Sausage’ patty in selected retail stores in the USA, then to more retail stores in September 2020. This was followed by the introduction of a sausage-links version in the USA in October 2020 and Canada in September 2021.

==== Beyond Meatballs (2019–present) ====
'Beyond Meatballs', a plant-based alternative to traditional beef-and-pork meatballs, were first introduced at Subway in 2019 through the Beyond Meatball Marinara sub. In September 2020, Beyond Meatballs were rolled out at select grocery stores across the U.S.

Beyond Meatballs are made mainly of pea protein, rice protein, and seasoning.

=== Plant-based chicken ===
==== Beyond Chicken Nuggets (2022–present) ====
In January 2022, 'Beyond Chicken Nuggets' were released in KFC stores across the USA. This was expanded to retail in November 2022.

=== Discontinued products ===
==== Chicken strips (2012–2019) ====
The company's first product, launched in 2012, was designed to emulate chicken and sold frozen. The product was licensed from Harold Huff and Fu-Hung Hsieh at the University of Missouri. They were made from "soy powder, gluten-free flour, carrot fiber and other ingredients". Although praised by some celebrities, journalists who tasted it said the "likeness to real chicken was tolerable, at best", and the chicken product was discontinued in 2019.

==== Beyond Meat Jerky (2022–2024) ====
In March 2022, Beyond Meat launched its jerky product in conjunction with PepsiCo. It was Beyond Meat's first shelf-stable product and came in original, teriyaki, and "hot & spicy" flavors. Beyond Meat discontinued it in February 2024.

== Nutrition ==
The original Beyond Burger patty contained 1,100 kilojoules (270 kilocalories) of food energy, 20 grams of protein, 20 grams of fat (of which five grams was saturated fat) and one gram of salt. Whilst the protein and fat content was similar to a beef patty of a similar weight, the salt content was "much higher" but without any cholesterol. The number of ingredients and processes involved in making the products mean they were classified as ultra-processed foods in the Nova classification.

In February 2024, Beyond Meat updated its beef recipe to reduce the ingredient list and decrease the content of salt by 20% and saturated fat by 60%. This new recipe achieved certification from the American Heart Association and the American Diabetes Association.

Beyond Meat products are certified as not containing genetically modified ingredients, added hormones or antibiotics, or cholesterol and are certified Kosher and Halal.

== Market distribution ==
In July 2019, Dunkin' Donuts announced that they would begin selling breakfast sandwiches using the Meatless Sausage product in Manhattan, with plans for national distribution beginning on 6 November 2019.

In November 2020, Beyond Meat announced a collaboration with McDonald's for development of the McPlant option, a plant-based patty and chicken substitute. It started testing the McPlant in Denmark and Sweden in February 2021. Testing of the McPlant burger by McDonald's in the USA ended in July 2022 after poor sales in 600 restaurants, but McDonald's sells the product in several European countries.

In 2020, Beyond Meat launched an e-commerce site to sell products directly to consumers. It also announced the launch in China of a plant-based version of minced pork.

In January 2021, Taco Bell announced a collaboration with Beyond Meat, initially as a test and then as a permanent option for a new plant-based protein food. Also in January 2021, Beyond Meat and PepsiCo announced a joint venture, called The PLANeT Partnership, to develop and market plant-based snacks and drinks.

From 2019 to 2023, Beyond Meat was in partnership with Del Taco. From 2019 to 2024, Beyond Meat was in partnership with Carl's Jr..

In September 2021, Beyond Meat announced it would begin selling their vegan chicken tenders in retail stores, including Walmart.

=== Production locations ===
In the United States, Beyond Meat has several manufacturing facilities in the United States, including in Columbia, Missouri, and Pennsylvania. In June 2018, Beyond Meat opened its second production facility in Columbia, Missouri, resulting in a three-fold increase of the company's manufacturing space. In 2020, Beyond Meat acquired a manufacturing facility in Devault, Pennsylvania. In 2018, Beyond Meat opened a 26,000 square feet (2,400 m^{2}) R&D lab in El Segundo, California. In January 2021, Beyond Meat announced that it will be opening a new global headquarters in El Segundo, CA later that year. The company says the facility will house three to four times its current number of R&D team members once the campus is complete.

In Europe, Beyond Meat has two facilities in the Netherlands: a co-manufacturing facility in Zoeterwoude owned and operated by Dutch company Zandbergen, and an owned facility in Enschede. These two facilities service the distribution network across Europe, the Middle East and Africa.

In China, Beyond Meat operated an owned manufacturing plant in Jiaxing, Zhejiang. It is the company's first "end-to-end manufacturing facility" outside of the United States and began full-scale production in 2021.

=== Supplier civil suit ===
In March 2019, a civil suit was filed against Beyond Meat by its former business partner and supplier, Don Lee Farms. This was prompted by Beyond Meat's switch to different suppliers in 2017, with whom Don Lee Farms alleged Beyond Meat then shared details about the manufacturing process. Don Lee Farms alleged breach of contract, and further alleged that they had expressed "significant concerns" about food safety protocols for raw materials produced at Beyond Meat's facility which were then given to Don Lee Farms for further processing. In 2022, the parties settled the dispute, with neither admitting liability or wrongdoing.

== See also ==
- Impossible Foods
- List of meat substitutes
- Veganism
