= Jambon =

Savoury pastry snack

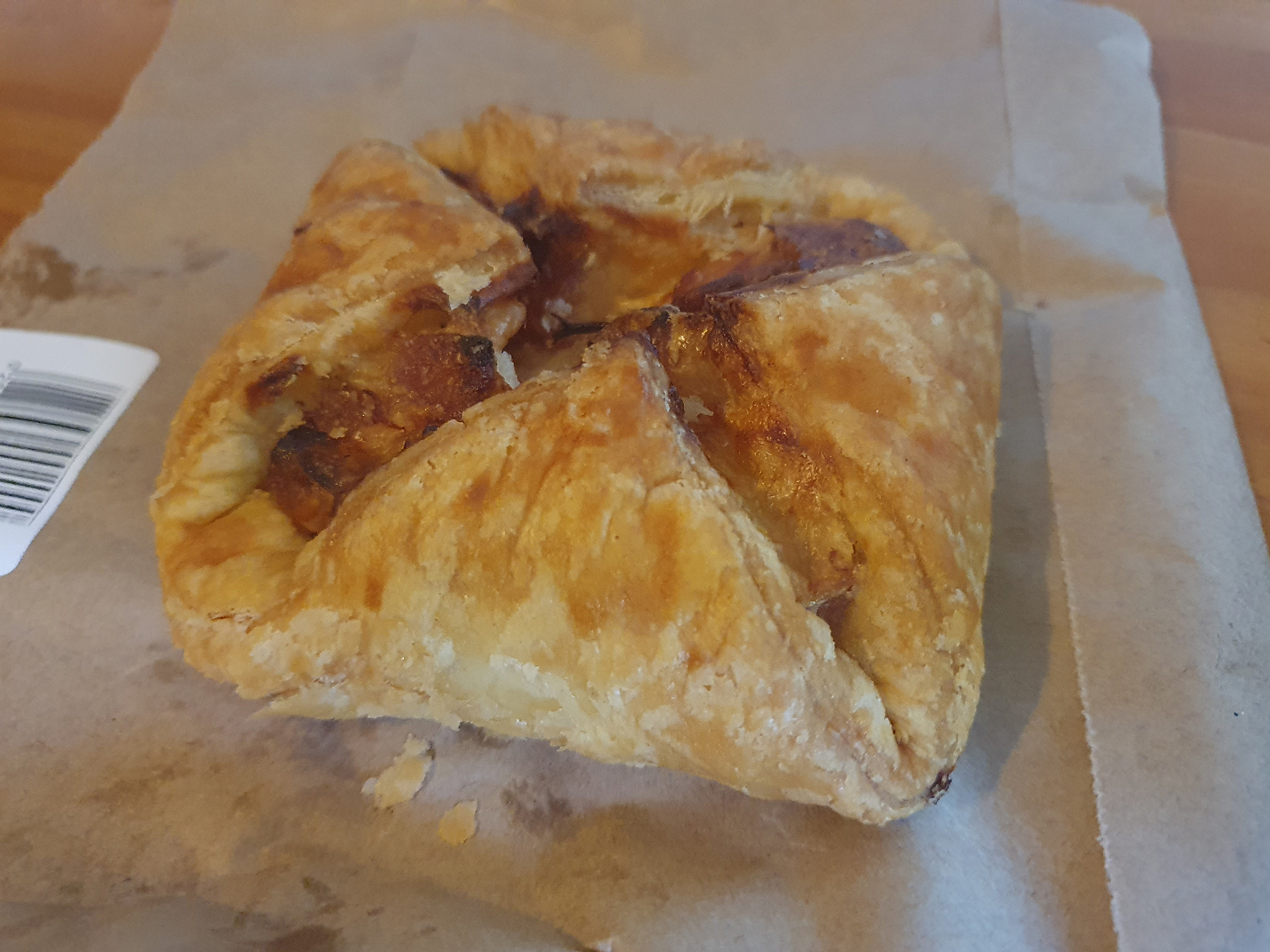
- A jambon
- Type: Pastry
- Course: Lunch / Snack
- Associated cuisine: Ireland
- Main ingredients: Puff pastry, ham, cheese

Jambons (from French jambon 'ham'; Irish: siamban, [ˈʃiəmˠbˠənˠ]) are square pastries filled with cheese and chunks of ham. They are a deli item popular in Ireland.

== History ==
The product emerged during the 1990s as part of a broader movement towards "food to go". The multinational bakery company Délifrance says that it adapted and launched the jambon as a new product in the Irish market in 1997.

Twenty million jambons were purchased by Irish consumers in 2020. Following the trend of meat-free sausage rolls, vegan jambons have also been available since 2020. These pastries are produced in a similar manner, using meat substitutes and cheese analogues for the filling.

Jambons are known in France as paniers feuilletés au jambon et au fromage (puff pastry baskets with ham and cheese).

On March 19, 2021, Jambons Limited registered a trademark in Ireland for 'Jambons'. The trademark covers two images of the word 'Jambons'. Jambons Limited also registered another 'Jambons' trademark in the United Kingdom on October 8, 2021.

== Variants ==
Jambons Limited, part of the Golden Bake Group in Ireland, markets several variants of jambons, including:

- Golden Bake Jambons
- Mini Jambons
- Mini Pepperoni Jambons

Events and competitions involving jambons have also been hosted and popularised in Ireland, including the annual National Jambons Day (March 18th), and campaigns such as Golden Bake seeking their new 'Head Jambons Taster'.

== In popular culture ==
In the RTÉ comedy series Hardy Bucks, one of the main characters, Buzz McDonnell, has an obsession with jambons.

== See also ==
- Sausage roll
- Puff pastry
- Croissant
