= Frank McCoy =

Frank McCoy may refer to:

- Frank McCoy (American football) (1881–1954), American football coach
- Frank McCoy (author) (1887/88–1940), health specialist and author
- Frank Ross McCoy (1874–1954), American army officer
- Frank McCoy (baseball) (1906–1982), American Negro leagues baseball player
