= Vegetarian hot dog =

Hot dog made with plant-based ingredients

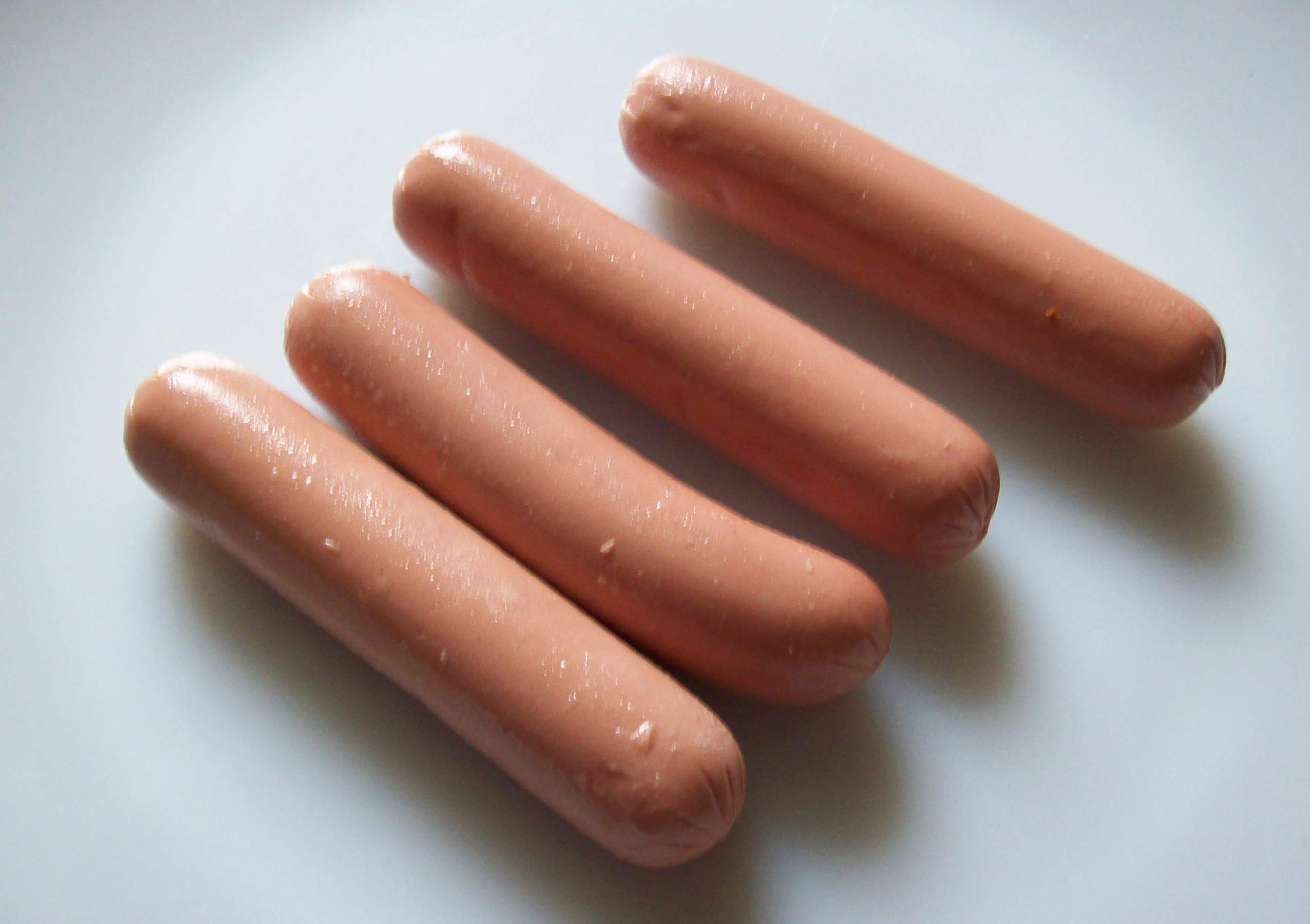
- Vegetarian hot dog sausages from Germany
- Alternative names: Veggie dog, not dog
- Type: Hot dog, meat alternative
- Place of origin: United States
- Main ingredients: soy

A vegetarian hot dog is a hot dog produced completely from non-meat products. Unlike traditional homemade meat sausages, the casing is not made of intestine, but of cellulose or other plant-based ingredients. The filling is usually based on a soy protein, wheat gluten, or pea protein. Some may contain egg whites, which would make them unsuitable for a lacto-vegetarian or vegan diet.

== History ==
The history of the vegetarian hot dog is not clear, but Worthington Foods' Veja-Link meatless wieners claim to have been the world's first vegetarian hot dogs in 1949. Since the 1980s, other manufacturers have entered the vegetarian hot dog market, such as SoyBoy, Lightlife Foods, Field Roast Grain Meat Co, and Beyond Meat. Massachusetts-based LightLife first sold its Tofu Pups in 1985. In 2000, the Chicago White Sox's Comiskey Park became the first baseball venue to sell vegetarian hot dogs during games. In 2019, Moving Mountains began selling a vegan hot dog in London. The Nathan's Famous hot dog stands in New York City began selling vegan hot dogs in 2021, with dogs made by Meatless Farm.

== Carrot hot dogs ==
A carrot hot dog is a carrot cured to taste like a hot dog, then grilled and placed in a roll to resemble a traditional hot dog. Philadelphia magazine reported photos of carrot hot dogs appeared on Instagram and Pinterest in 2016. The Kennebec Journal reported in 2017 that carrot hot dog recipes were "an emerging trend" in cookbooks. Epicurious said it has been trolled ever since posting a carrot hot dog recipe in 2017.

Some restaurants sell them. In 2019, Harry & Ida's Meat and Supply Co. in New York sold a carrot dog. United States beverage firm Bolthouse Farms in 2020 began producing grill-ready cured carrot hot dogs to sell to retailers.

Actress Tabitha Brown first published a carrot hot dog recipe in 2020. In 2021, pop star Lizzo posted about carrot hot dogs. Vegan food columnist Avery Yale Kamila said in 2021: "For people who love vegetables, carrot hot dogs are a really exciting addition to backyard barbecues."

== Vegetarian sausage rolls ==
Sausage rolls are a common fast food snack across Britain made from a sausage inside a pastry crust. Vegetarian versions or meat-free sausage rolls are now common. The small bakery chain Poundberry began selling vegetarian sausage rolls in 2016 and then a vegan version in 2018. In 2019, large bakery chain Greggs began selling vegan sausage rolls and the BBC reported the vegan rolls "caused an immediate sensation" and sold out fast.

== Vegetarian sausages ==
Vegetarian and vegan sausages are commonly eaten in Britain. The United States company Beyond Meat began selling its vegan sausages in the United Kingdom in 2019.

== See also ==
- Meat-free sausage roll
- Vegetarian bacon
- Vegetarian sausage
- List of hot dogs
- List of meat substitutes
