= Lightlife =

American company producing vegetarian and vegan meat substitutes

Lightlife Foods, Inc.
- Type: Wholly-owned
- Industry: Food
- Genre: Food manufacturing
- Founded: 1979
- Headquarters: Turners Falls, Massachusetts, United States
- Key people: Dan Curtin (President)
- Products: Vegan meat substitutes; plant-based foods
- Owner: Greenleaf Foods SPC
- Website: lightlife.com

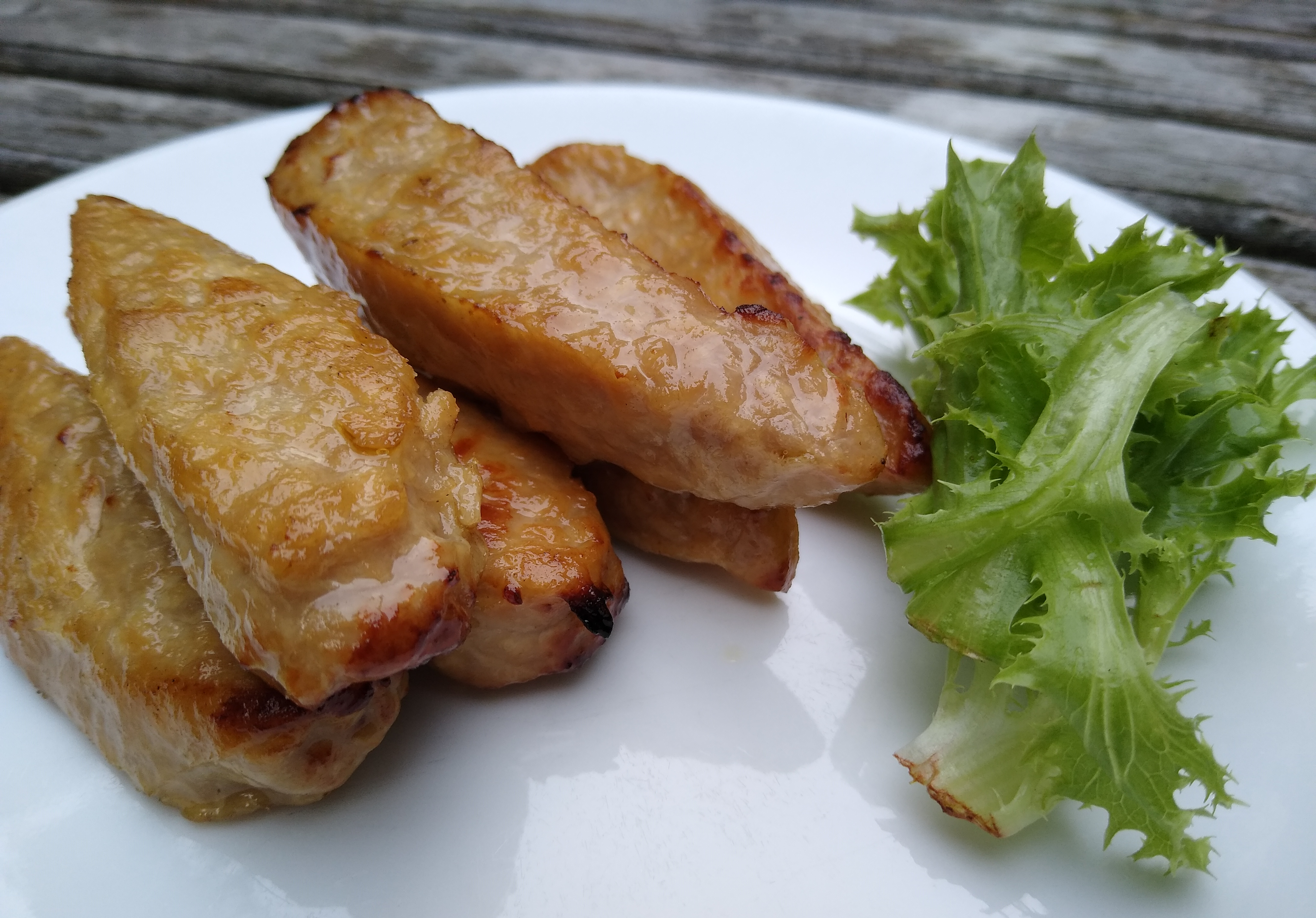
Lightlife "Smart Tenders"

Lightlife Foods is a company that produces food for plant-based diets. In 2018, its worth was estimated at $80 million. It is best known for its plant-based veggie dog, Smart Dog, which launched in 1993. In 2019, the company launched a plant-based burger to compete with Impossible Foods and Beyond Meat. Lightlife Foods is a carbon-neutral company.

== History ==
Lightlife was founded in Greenfield, Massachusetts, by Michael Cohen and Chia Collins in 1979 before relocating to Turner Falls, Massachusetts, in 1998. It was first founded as Tempeh Works in an old, converted car wash and officially became Lightlife in 1984 and tempeh was its main product. Chia Collins, the President, on founding the company stated, "We were just two hippies in 1970s. We did not plan on building this size of a company...We were just into vegetarian eating, the wonders of the soybean, and we started out with tempeh." They expanded their products to include plant-based meat alternatives, including now discontinued items Tofu Pups, Fakin Bacon, and Phoney Bologna. These were later revamped to Smart Sausage, Smart Bacon, and Smart Deli respectively with new recipes. They also created the popular Gimmie Lean Sausage, the name being a play on the Jimmy Dean sausage.

In the summer of 2000, ConAgra Foods acquired LightLife Foods, which was generating about $25 million in annual revenue at the time. The sale was made due to the changing landscape of the natural foods industry; competitors were purchased by Kellogg's and Kraft Foods, and a small independently owned company would not be able to compete with such huge food conglomerates. In an effort to keep the company engaged in the community, Michael Cohen, Lightlife's CEO at the time, said, "The deal calls for Lightlife to remain at its new facility in the Turners Falls section of Montague [Massachusetts], to retain its 145 employees, and to preserve Lightlife’s social mission," indicating the company's dedication to social consciousness, especially regarding its local community.

In 2010, ConAgra dissolved the administrative jobs and moved them to its Omaha headquarters, by 2013, it was still one of the area's largest employers. They remain involved in the local rural community donating to the Green River Festival, the Greenfield Triathlon, and most recently Monte's March, an annual stunt that raises money for the Food Bank before thanksgiving.

Brynwood Partners acquired the company, which had roughly 90 employees at the time, from ConAgra Foods in September 2013. In 2017, Maple Leaf Foods bought Lightlife Foods for $140 million plus related costs. In 2019, LightLife introduced a plant-based burger produced with pea protein, garlic powder and beet powder for color. Lightlife Foods launched its plant-based burger in foodservice before bringing it to retail stores. Known for making products from soy protein and tempeh, the Lightlife Plant-Based Burger was instead developed with pea protein, coconut oil, and beet powder because pea protein provided a meatier texture than soy protein. Competitor Beyond Meat also uses pea protein in its plant-based burger.

To meet the heightened demand of production, Lightlife Foods' parent company, Greenleaf Foods, broke ground of a new food processing plant in Shelbyville, Indiana in 2019 and bought more than a year's worth of the pea protein the same year. At the time, the Shelbyville plant was reported to be "North America's biggest plant-based protein facility" by the time it was fully operational. The plant cost $310 million and would double the production capacity of Lightlife and Field Roast, another Greenleaf Foods brand, with a forecast output of 60 million pounds of plant-based meat annually. In March 2020, before the COVID-19 pandemic, the plant-based meat category was reported to have experienced 18% growth year over year. By May 2020, sales for fresh meat alternatives increased 255%, accelerated by an unavailability of traditional meat that was created by supply chain issues during the COVID-19 pandemic. In June 2020, Lightlife Foods reported that, despite a loss of foodservice business because of the pandemic, it expected sales to grow 30% in 2020. In its 2020 annual report, the company reported increased sales of about $25 million compared to the previous year.

A partnership between Soldier Field in Chicago and Lightlife Foods was announced in 2019. As part of the partnership, Lightlife's plant-based burgers would be sold at home games for the Chicago Bears. In October 2020, Lightlife announced a deal with Bowlero Corporation, which operates bowling lanes in North America. As part of the deal, Lightlife's plant-based burger would be sold at Bowlero and Bowlmor Lanes locations and Lightlife sponsored the 2020 PBA Tour.

In January 2021, Lightlife Foods' parent company, Greenleaf Foods, a subsidiary of Maple Leaf Foods, announced that it would purchase a food processing plant in Indianapolis, Indiana to exclusively produce tempeh products, putting construction of the Shelbyville, Indiana plant on hold. The cost of the purchase was estimated at $100 million. Dan Curtin, the President of Greenleaf Foods, claimed that "Lightlife Tempeh accounted for about 80% of total US tempeh dollar sales" in 2020. The tempeh product line is available at over 18,500 retail locations after Lightlife expanded the line into 3,500 Walmart stores in November 2020.

== Products ==
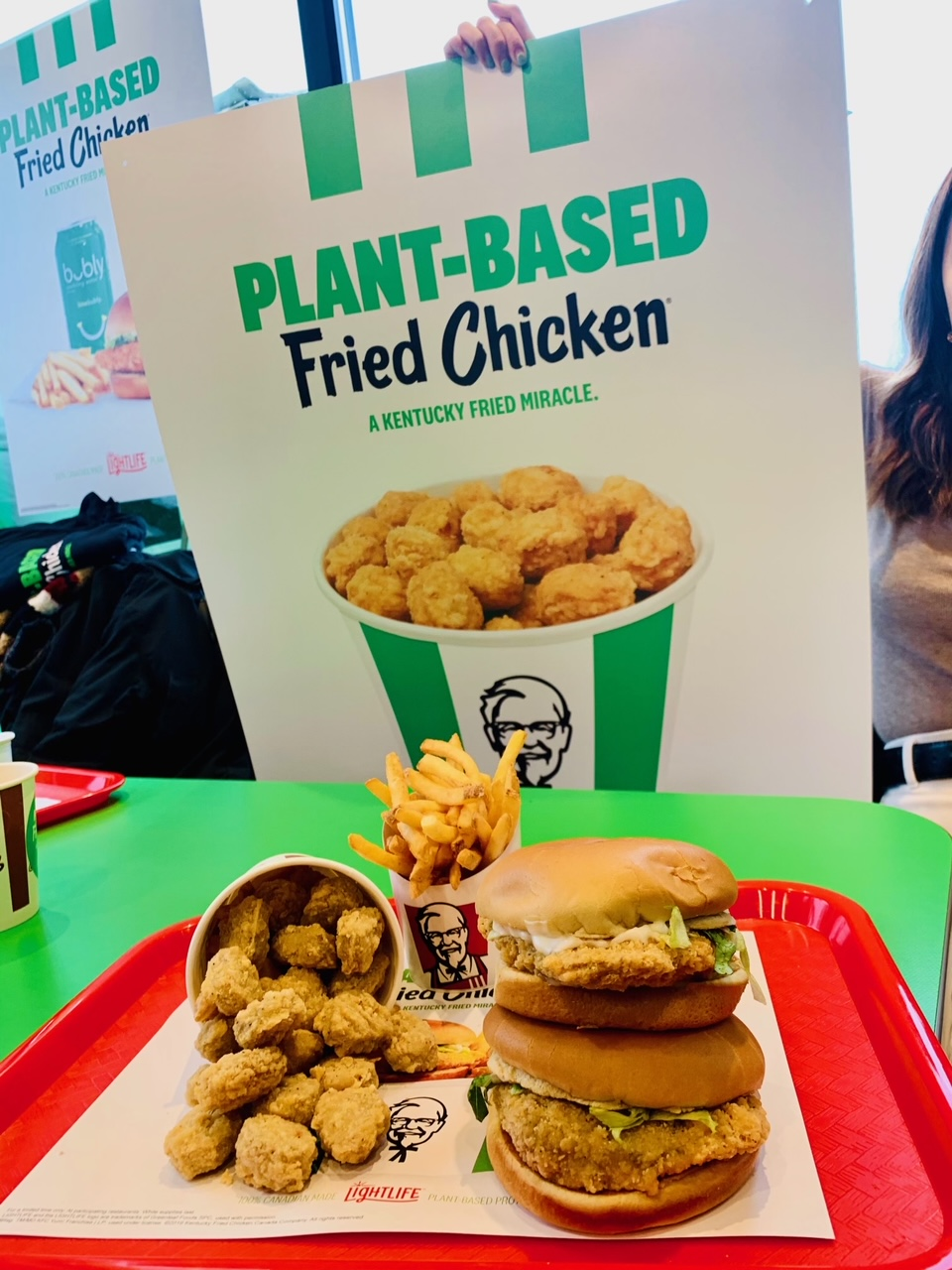
KFC Plant-Based Chicken in Canada

Lightlife Foods produces an assortment of tempeh, soy protein, and pea protein products.

- Smart Dogs - Launched in 1993, Lightlife Smart Dogs are plant-based veggie dogs that were originally developed with soy protein, before being relaunched in 2012 with a new formula that included pea protein in addition to soy protein.
- Plant-Based Burger - Launched in 2019, the Lightlife Plant-Based Burger is made with pea protein, coconut oil and beet powder. The burger was sold at Harvey's restaurant locations across Canada and at Dave & Buster's restaurant locations across the United States and Canada. The Lightlife burger was discontinued by Harvey's in July 2022.
- Plant-Based Chicken - Lightlife Smart Tenders are plant-based chicken made with soy protein. In August 2020, Lightlife plant-based chicken became a permanent menu item at KFC restaurant locations in Canada.

== Advertising campaigns ==
Lightlife launched a campaign called "A Taste of Honesty" with actors Kristen Bell and Dax Shepard in 2019. The campaign was promoted across social media with a two-minute video and the hashtag #ATasteOfHonesty. The ad was chosen by AdWeek as the ad of the day on October 8, 2019. When a commenter on Instagram was concerned about possible exploitation of the children in the ad, Kristen Bell responded to clarify that the children in the ads were actors and not her own.

=== Clean Break campaign ===
On August 25, 2020, Lightlife published an open letter advertisement in The New York Times and The Wall Street Journal to challenge competitors Impossible Foods and Beyond Meat about their use of "unnecessary additives, fillers, and fake blood" in their plant-based burgers. In response, Impossible Foods published a blog post on the website Medium calling Lightlife's Clean Break campaign a "disingenuous, desperate disinformation campaign attempting to cast doubt on the integrity of our products".

Lightlife Foods partnered with vegetarian late night host Lilly Singh to create an Instagram campaign called "Make a Clean Break with Lilly Singh" in October 2020. The social campaign was featured on Lightlife's Instagram profile as a continuation of its Clean Break Campaign. In the campaign, Singh provided advice to followers looking to "make a clean break from something in their lives".

== See also ==
- List of meat substitutes
- List of vegetarian and vegan companies
