= Morningstar Farms =

Division of Kellanova

- Type: Division
- Industry: Food
- Founded: 1974; 52 years ago
- Headquarters: United States
- Parent: Kellanova
- Website: www.morningstarfarms.com

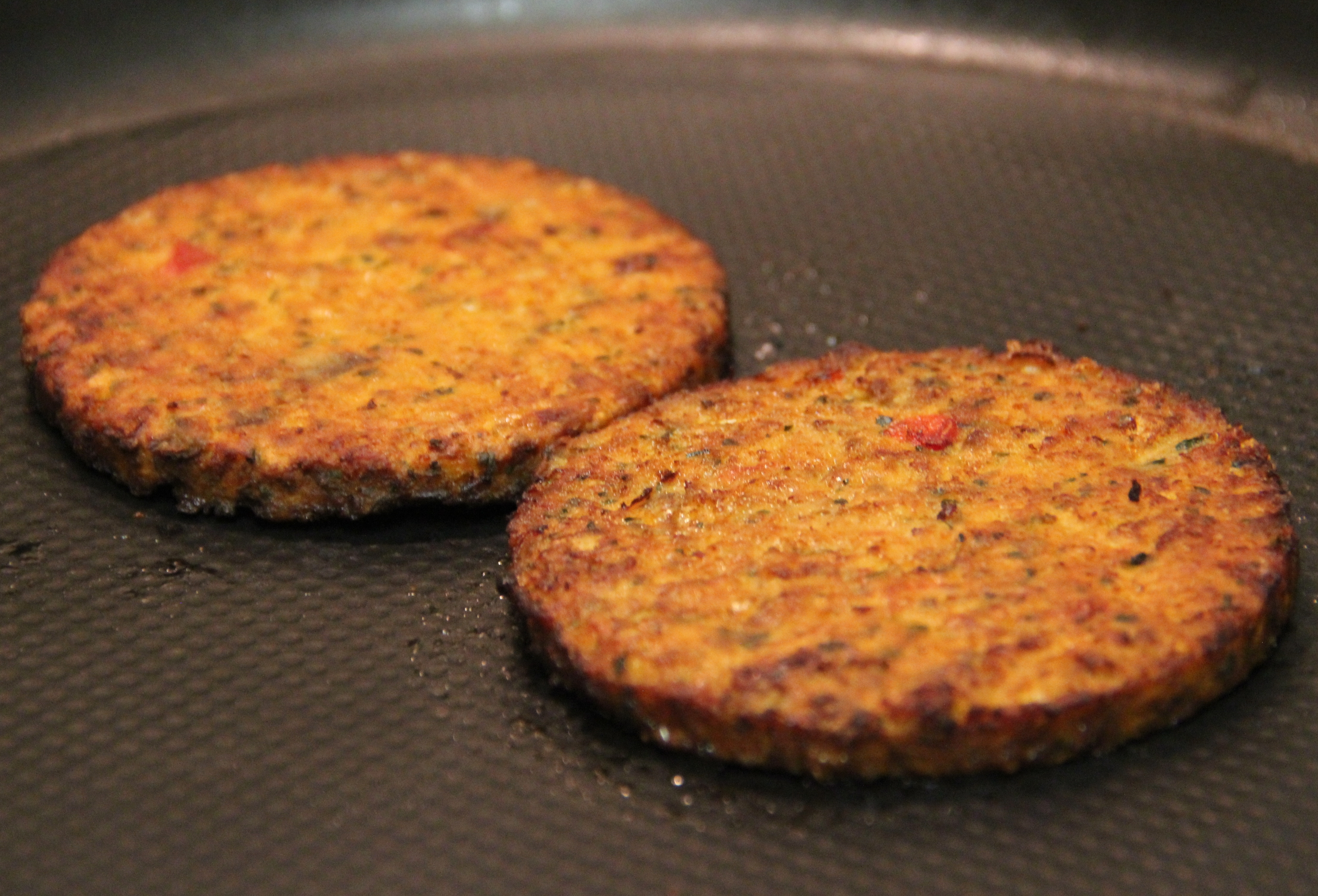
Two Morningstar veggie burgers on a frying pan

Morningstar Farms (stylized as MorningStar Farms) is a division of Kellanova that produces vegan and vegetarian food. Many of their offerings are plant-based variations of traditionally meat products. Their products include meatless chicken nuggets, popcorn chicken, corn dogs, breakfast sausage, burgers, hot dogs, bacon, and pizza rolls with vegan cheese. Originally, Morningstar offered some, but not all vegan products. In 2019, Morningstar Farms announced all products would be vegan by 2021, but had not yet done so as of May 2024.

== History ==
Morningstar Farms was introduced by Worthington Foods (originally part of Miles Laboratories). The frozen food line of soy-based meatless meats was introduced into supermarkets and grocery stores in the U.S. in 1975. It was widely advertised and introduced Americans to the use of soy as a base for meat analogs. Kellogg's purchased Worthington Foods from Bayer AG's North American division for $307 million in October 1999, at which point it acquired the Morningstar Farms brand. Kellogg sold Worthington in 2014 but retained the Morningstar line of products. In 2021, Kellogg's announced it would spend $43 million to expand their Zanesville, Ohio, Morningstar Farms manufacturing plant.

== See also ==
- List of meat substitutes
- List of vegetarian and vegan companies
