= Meat-free sausage roll =

Savoury pastry snack

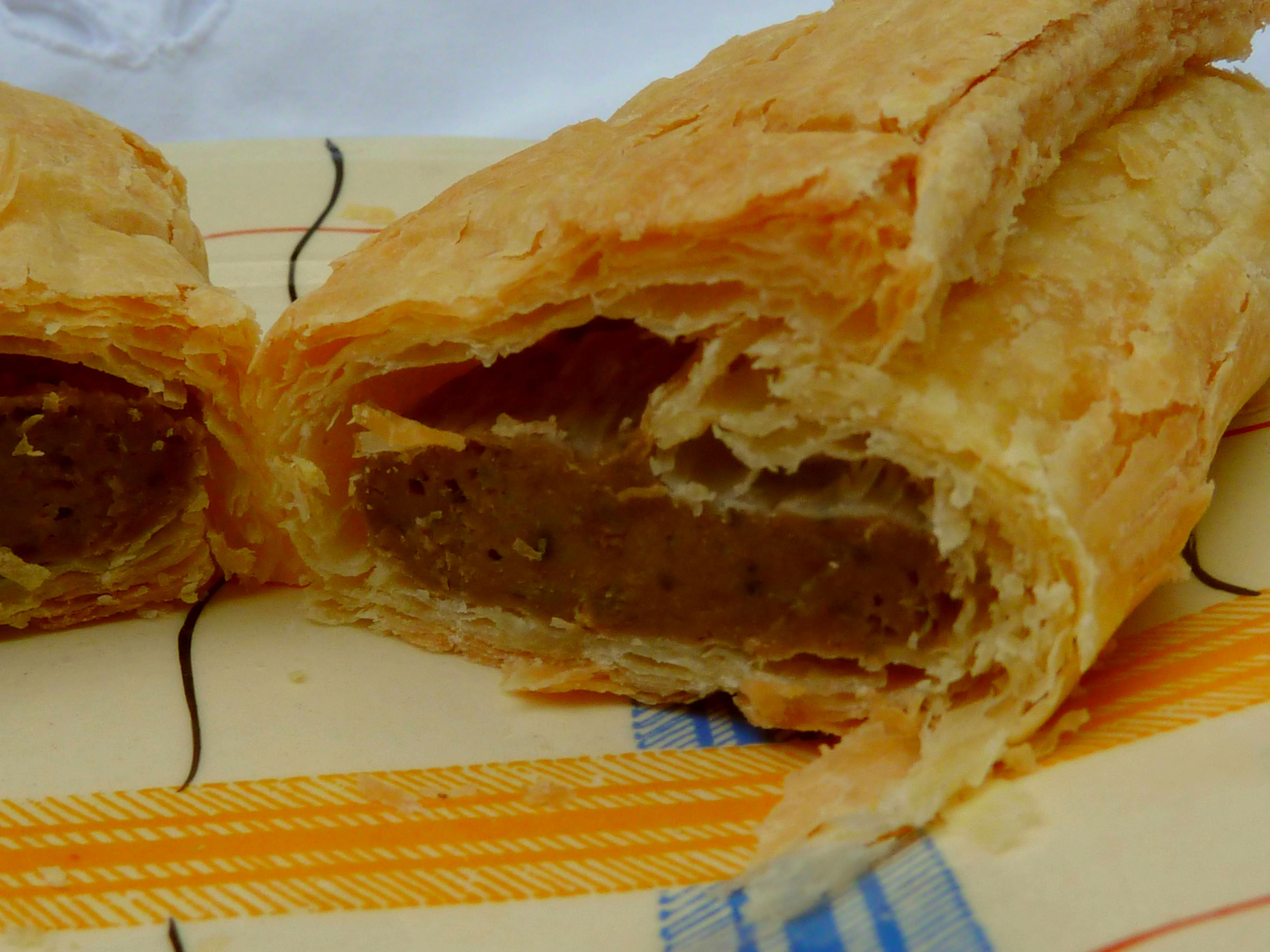
A meat-free sausage roll, sliced in half

A meat-free sausage roll (also known as a vegetarian sausage roll or vegan sausage roll) is a savoury pastry snack that contains a non-meat filling. The snack is an alternative to the conventional sausage roll that generally contains pork or beef. Meat-free sausage rolls are sold at retail outlets and are also available from bakeries as a takeaway food.

== Composition ==
The basic composition of a meat-free sausage roll is sheets of puff pastry formed into tubes around a meat alternative filling, before being baked. Common meat alternatives used to create the meatless sausage in a meat-free sausage roll include pea protein, mushrooms, soybean products, lentils, quinoa, and beans.

Linda McCartney Foods produce meat-free sausage rolls based on soya.

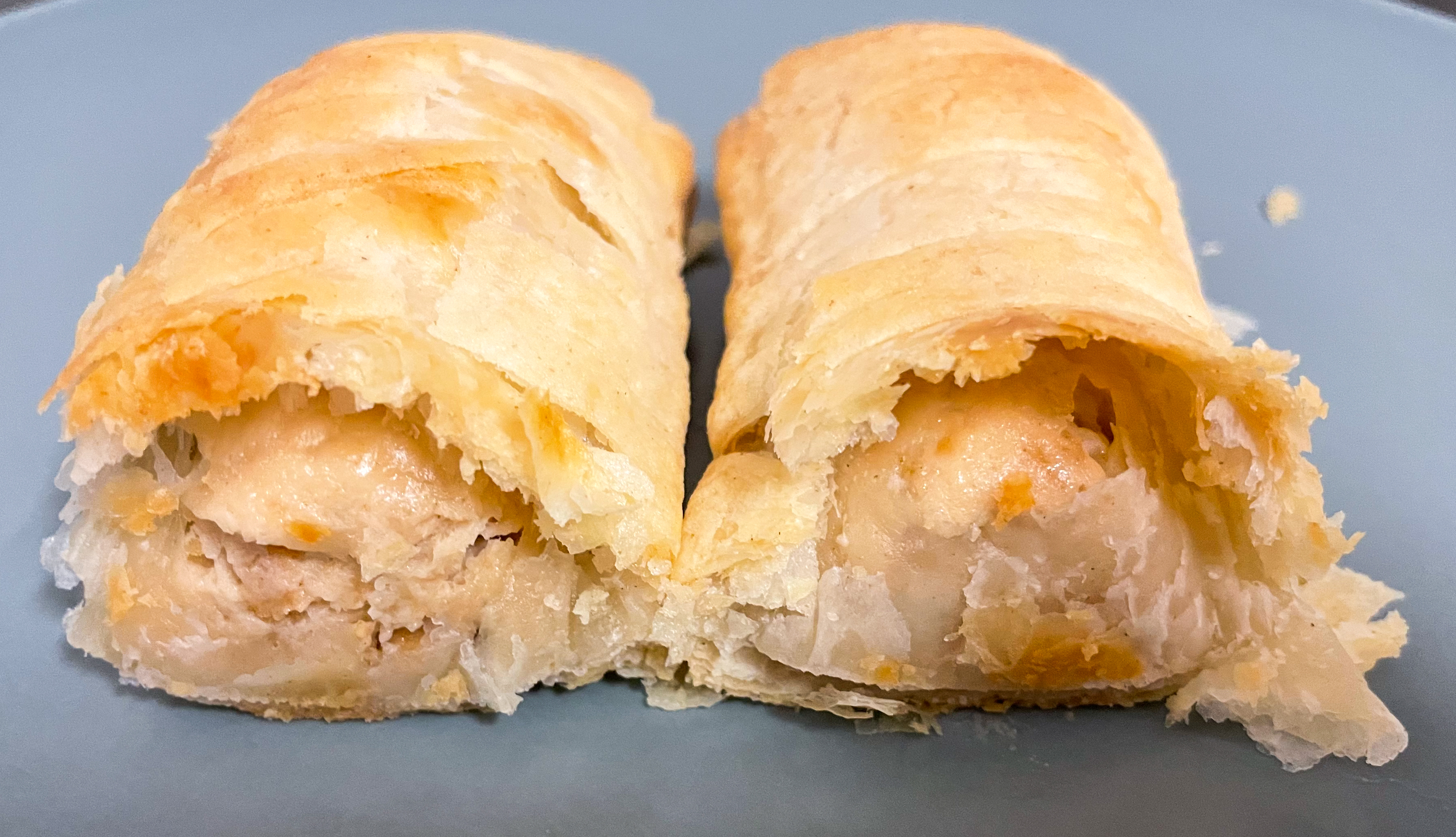
The Greggs meat-free sausage roll (home-baked); sliced in half

In the UK in 2019, the bakery chain Greggs launched a meat-free sausage roll made using the mycoprotein mixture Quorn. It became one of the company's five best-selling products, and contributed to a 50% increase in their profits.

== See also ==
- Vegetarian hot dog
- Vegetarian bacon
- Vegetarian sausage
- Meat alternative
