= Vegetarian bacon =

Vegetarian food emulating bacon

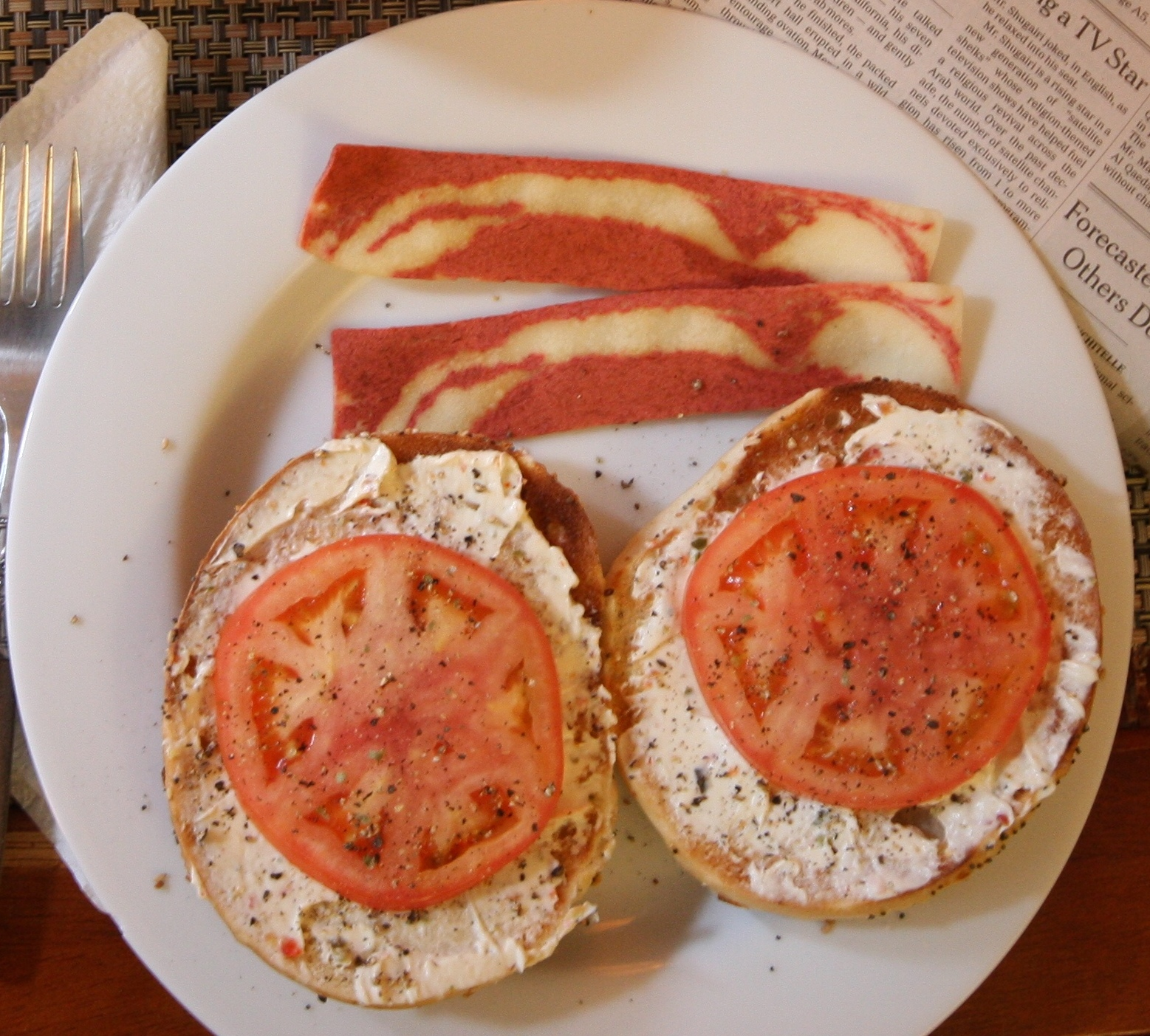
A breakfast of vegetarian bacon, bagel halves, cream cheese, and tomato

Vegetarian bacon, also referred to as veggie bacon, vegan bacon, vegan rashers, vacon, or facon (a portmanteau of "fake" and "bacon"), is a plant-based imitation of bacon.

== Nutrition ==
It is high in protein and fiber, yet low in fat, and has no cholesterol. Many vegan bacon products are lower in salt than pork bacon, and some have less than 10% of the fat. Two slices of one particular brand average 310 kilojoules (75 kilocalories) of food energy.

== Range ==
Brands include Morningstar Farms, LightLife, Quorn, Tofurky, Soy Boy, Sweet Earth, Upton's Naturals, and Hooray Foods.

In 2015, the Media Wales reported vegan restaurant Anna Loka in Cardiff served vegan rashers. In 2021, Aldi supermarkets in the United Kingdom added No Pork Streaky Bacon Rashers. Sainsbury's sold vegan sausages wrapped in vegan rashers during Christmas 2021. In 2023, Burger King added vegan bacon, made by La Vie Bakon, to its UK menus.

== Homemade recipes ==
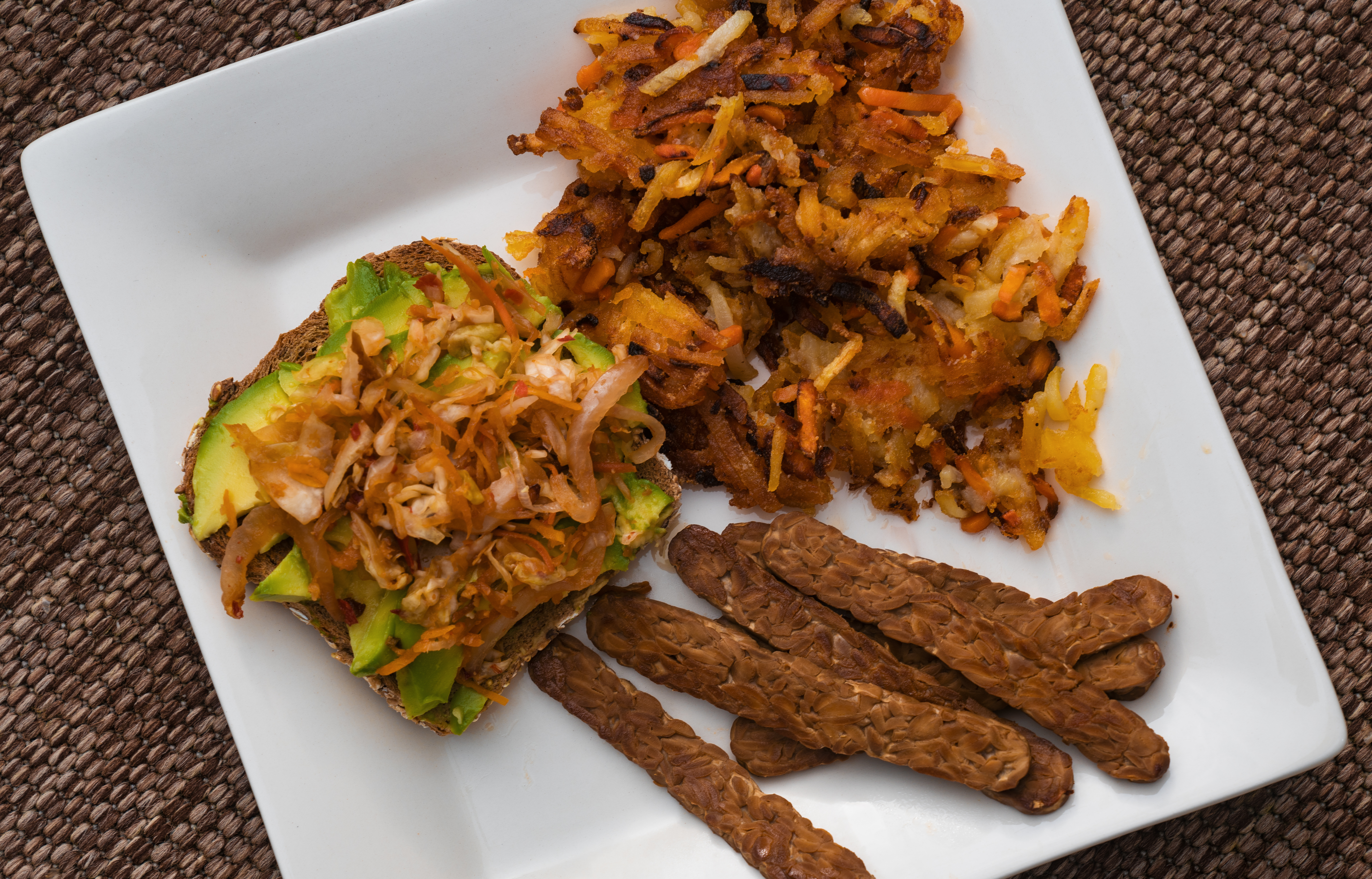
A breakfast with strips of tempeh bacon

Welsh chef Gaz Oakley makes a vegan version of bacon bits from coconut flakes. The Bangor Daily News reported that vegan expert Avery Yale Kamila said homemade vegan bacon can be made from shiitake mushrooms, rice paper, coconut, eggplant, or banana peels. Vegetarian bacon can also be made at home by marinating strips of tempeh or tofu in various flavorings, such as soy sauce or liquid smoke, and then either frying or baking. Aficionados of raw food also use coconut meat as a bacon substitute. Seitan can also be formed into vegetarian bacon.

Food writer David Goldbeck suggests frying provolone cheese in a skillet to produce a bacon substitute he calls "cheeson".

Plant based recipes for vegetarian bacon often utilise seitan or rice paper. Flavourings include liquid smoke, nutritional yeast, smoked paprika, and barbecue sauce. American musician Lizzo cooks vegan bacon in maple syrup.

== See also ==
- List of meat substitutes
- Vegetarian hot dogs
- Vegetarian sausage
- Meat-free sausage roll
