= Harry & Ida's Meat and Supply Co. =

Coordinates: 40.729008°N 73.981693°W

- Interactive map of Harry & Ida's Meat and Supply Co.

Restaurant information
- Location: New York City, New York, United States

Harry & Ida's Meat and Supply Co. was a smokehouse and delicatessen located in Alphabet City, Manhattan, New York City that operated from 2015 to 2019.

== History ==
It was opened in 2015 by Will Horowitz and his sister Julia Horowitz. The owners also opened a restaurant in Tribeca called Harry and Ida's Luncheonette. Harry and Ida's is named after their grandparents, who owned a delicatessen in Harlem.

The shop closed in 2019 because the owners felt selling pastrami wasn't sustainable for the planet.

The shop did not offer any seating because it was regulated by the New York Department of Agriculture and not the New York City Department of Health, which oversees restaurants. The Gothamist has written that the rules of the Department of Agriculture allow Will Horowitz to "more fully pursue and experiment with the 'heritage techniques' of smoking, drying, fermentation, and aging that are his current passion."

== Pastrami sandwich ==
Its pastrami sandwich was considered one of the best in New York. It was served on a Pain d' Avignon club roll, instead of the tradition rye bread, with cracked rye berries, anchovy mustard, and buttermilk-fermented cucumber kraut. Their pastrami was brined with juniper berries and seasoned with coriander and black pepper before being smoked.

Besides pastrami, it also served a smoked eel sandwich (the live eels are butchered and smoked in-house), smoked bluefish and a smoked apricot chicken sandwich with green apple, red cabbage saurkraut, basil, and a charred poblano pepper sourcream seasoned with ras el hanout.

== Vegetable-based meats ==
It also had vegetarian options including a "vegetarian chopped liver" sandwich made from mushroom-walnut puree and an amaranth quinoa and sorghum grain salad topped with coconut babaganoush and baked tofu. In 2019, it added carrot hot dogs, smoked watermelon ham, prosciutto radish, and carpaccio from smoked celery root.
