= Sausage roll =

Savoury pastry snack

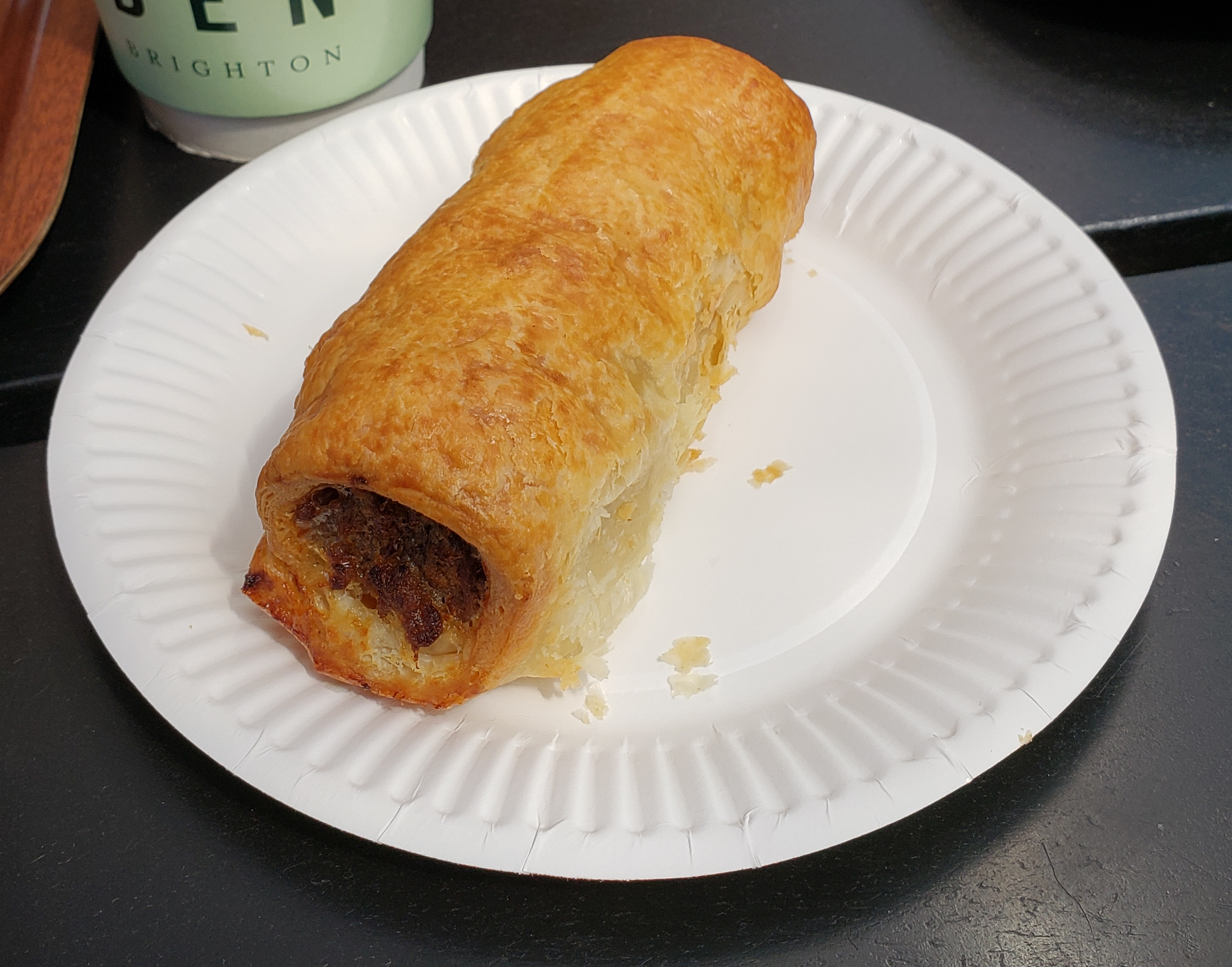
- Associated cuisine: United Kingdom
- Serving temperature: Hot or room temperature
- Main ingredients: Puff pastry, sausage meat

A sausage roll is a savoury dish, popular in current and former Commonwealth nations, consisting of sausage meat wrapped in puff pastry. Although variations are known throughout Europe and in other regions, the sausage roll is most closely associated with British cuisine. The British bakery chain Greggs sells around 2.5 million sausage rolls per week, or around 140 million per year.

== Composition ==
The basic composition of a sausage roll is sheets of puff pastry formed into tubes around sausage meat and glazed with egg or milk before being baked. They can be served either hot or cold. In the 19th century, they were made using shortcrust pastry instead of puff pastry. A vegetarian or vegan approximation of a sausage roll can be made in the same manner, using a meat substitute.

== History ==
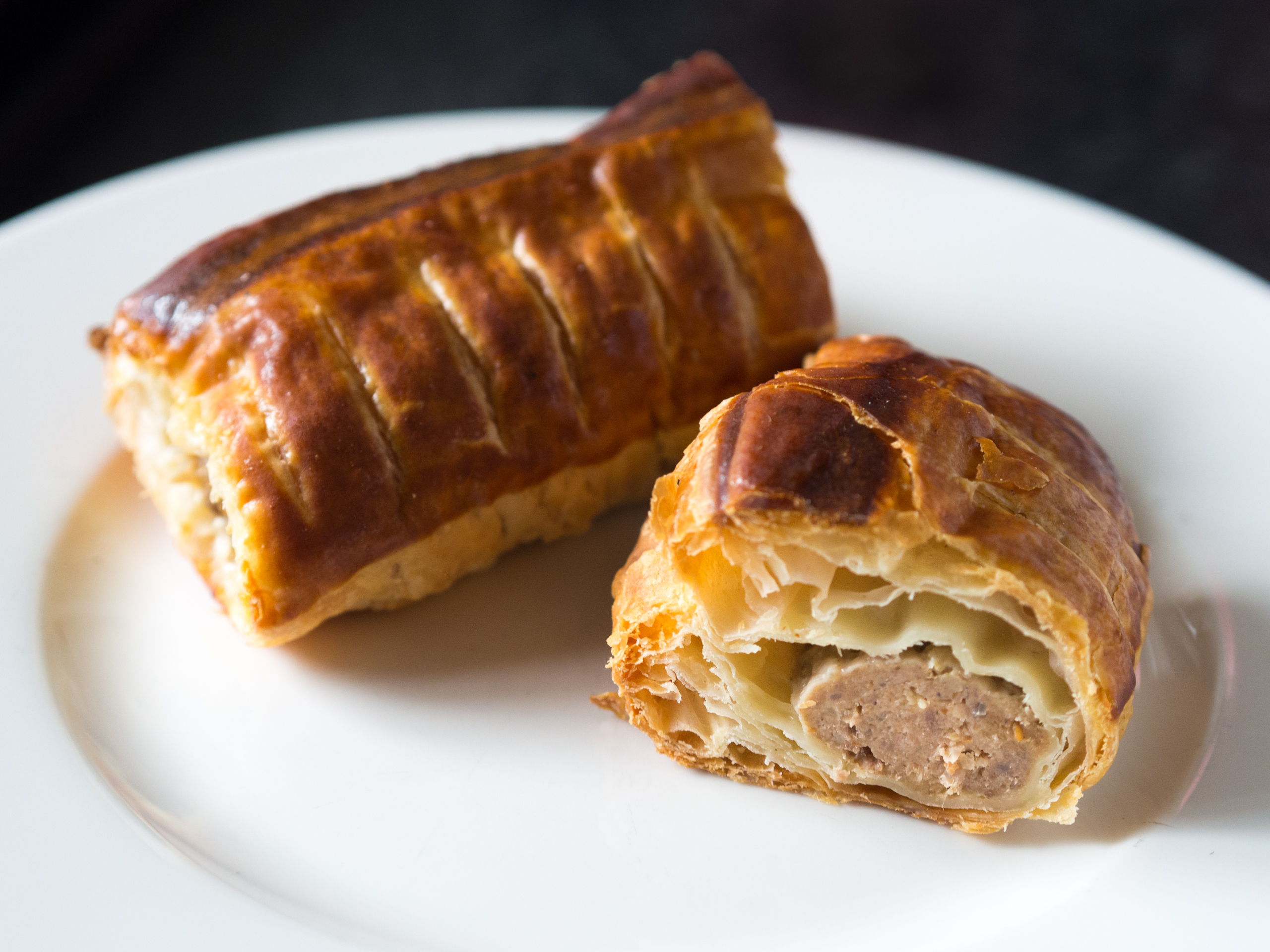
A Dutch sausage roll (saucijzenbroodje) showing the puff pastry surrounding the roll of minced meat inside

The wrapping of meat or other foodstuffs into dough can be traced back to the Classical Greek or Roman eras. Early versions of the roll with pork as a filling proved popular in London during the Napoleonic Wars and it became identified as an English dish.

On 20 September 1809, the Bury and Norwich Post mentions T. Ling, aged 75, (an industrious vendor of saloop, buns, and sausage rolls). The Times first mentions the food item in 1864 when William Johnstone, "wholesale pork pie manufacturer and sausage roll maker", was fined £15 (£1,300 in 2021), under the Nuisances Removal Act (Amendment) Act 1863, for having on his premises a large quantity of meat unsound, unwholesome and unfit for food. In 1894, a theft case provided further insights into the Victorian sausage roll production whereby the accused apprentice was taught to soak brown bread in red ochre, salt, and pepper to give the appearance of beef sausage for the filling.

== National variants ==
Similar meat and pastry recipes include the Czech klobásník, the Belgian worstenbroodje, the Dutch saucijzenbroodje, the German Münsterländer Wurstbrötchen and sausage bread in the United States. Hong Kong has developed its own style of sausage roll. Instead of having sausage meat wrapped in puff pastry like the traditional Western style, the Hong Kong style "sausage bun" (Chinese: 腸仔包) consists of a sausage wrapped inside a soft milk bread style bun.

== Sales and legacy ==
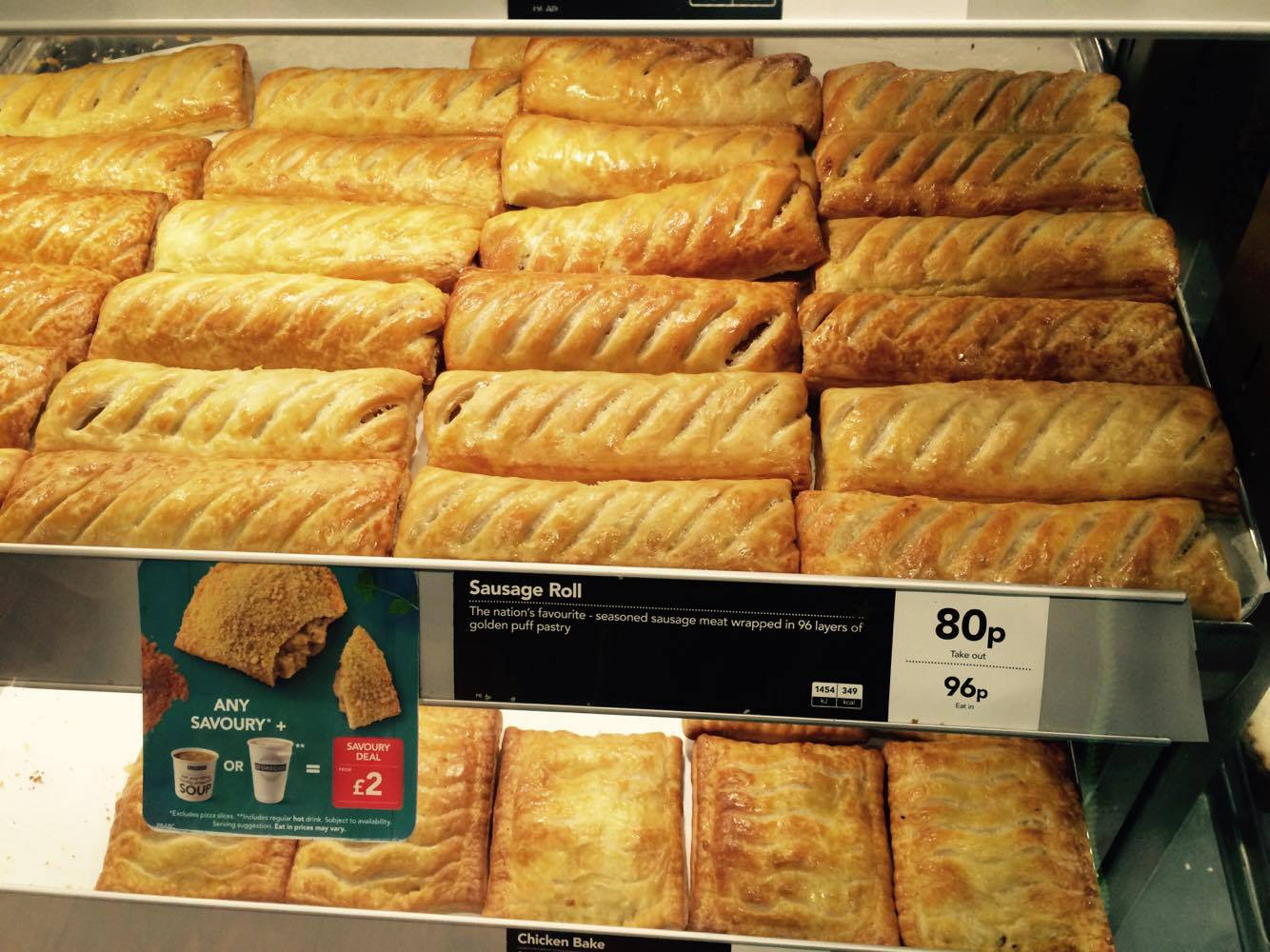
Sausage rolls for sale in the UK at a branch of Greggs

In the UK, the bakery chain Greggs sells around 2.5 million sausage rolls per week, or around 140 million per year. The sausage roll is most closely associated with British cuisine.

== In popular culture ==
- The 1896 Gilbert and Sullivan operetta The Grand Duke features sausage rolls as a plot device, where conspirators recognise one another by eating sausage rolls.
- From 2018 to 2022, English YouTuber LadBaby had five consecutive Christmas number ones on the UK Singles Chart with cover versions of songs where the lyrics were rewritten to reference sausage rolls, including "I Love Sausage Rolls", "Don't Stop Me Eatin'", and "Sausage Rolls for Everyone".

== See also ==
- Beef Wellington
- Jambon
- List of sausage dishes
- List of stuffed dishes
- Pigs in a blanket
