= Frank McCoy (author) =

Health author (1888–1940)

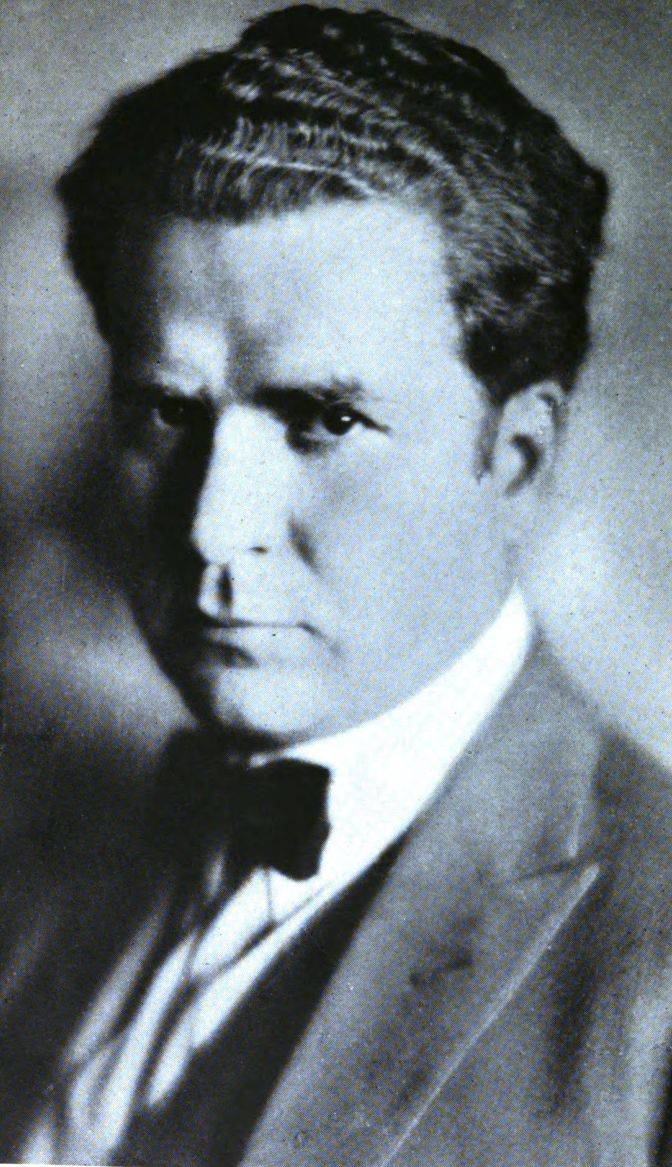
- Born: 1888; Milan, Ohio
- Died: 1940 (aged 51–52); Rustic Canyon, Los Angeles
- Occupation(s): Chiropractor, writer

Frank Joseph McCoy (March 4, 1888 – March 31, 1940) was an American chiropractor and alternative health author, known for his book The Fast Way to Health, as well as his nationally syndicated health- and nutrition-related newspaper columns and radio broadcasts. He was active between 1923 and 1940. His ideas were criticized by medical experts as quackery.

== Biography ==
He was born in Milan, Ohio, and received training in Chicago, in chiropractic. He is referred to in publications as "Dr. Frank McCoy" but did not have an M.D. degree.

His book, The Fast Way To Health, was first published in 1923 by the Times-Mirror Press. His first newspaper column "Health and Diet Advice" ran in the Los Angeles Times from 1927 to 1932 and was syndicated in other cities. During roughly this time, he also lectured and had a radio program in the Los Angeles area.

Other newspaper columns he has authored include "How to Keep Well" and "Here's To Your Health." He died at the age of 52 in his home at the Uplifters Club in Southern California. His death was related to liver disease.

== Criticism ==
McCoy was criticized for making dangerous pseudoscientific claims about fasting. For example, he stated that fasting could cure everything from deafness and diarrhoea to cancer. McCoy's book The Fast Way To Health developed a "Philosophy of Scientific Fasting" that was described by health writer Carl Malmberg as a "collection of misinformation".

His opinions drew criticism in The American Journal of Public Health and in a 1934 JAMA editorial which stated:

How long will newspapers and periodicals which share some responsibility for the public health continue to advise the uninformed in regard to infectious diseases in such ways as to encourage the spread and the virulence of these infections? It is not known how many newspapers print these daily discourses of Frank McCoy, pet of the Los Angeles Times. Surely editors fail their readers when they continue to promulgate such superlative nonsense as emanates from McCoy and his Los Angeles Times associates.

== Publications ==
- The Fast Way to Health (Los Angeles: Times-Mirror Press, 1923)

== See also ==
- Mildred Lager
