= Henrietta Latham Dwight =

American artist and writer (1840–1909)

- Born: Henrietta Marshall; October 21, 1840; Philadelphia, United States
- Died: February 8, 1909 (aged 68); Paris, France
- Other name: Henrietta Latham
- Occupations: Watercolor artist, cookbook writer
- Spouses: James Hoge Latham (m. 1860; died 1876) James F. Dwight (m. 1880)
- Children: 3

Henrietta Marshall Latham Dwight (born Henrietta Marshall; other married name Henrietta Latham; October 21, 1840 – February 8, 1909) was an American watercolor artist and cookbook writer. She was known for her landscapes and authored the vegetarian cookbook The Golden Age Cook-Book, in 1898.

== Biography ==
=== Early and personal life ===
Dwight was born in Philadelphia as Henrietta Marshall. Her parents were Charles Manchester Marshall of England and Henrietta Cole of Kentucky.

In 1860 she married James Hoge Latham, they had three children. In 1876, her husband died and she married Colonel James F. Dwight in 1880. She moved into a fifty-room mansion, Thrulow Lodge, in Menlo Park.

=== Art ===
Dwight was known for her watercolor landscapes. She studied with Christian Jorgensen and her artwork focused on Californian coastal life.

=== The Golden Age Cook-Book ===
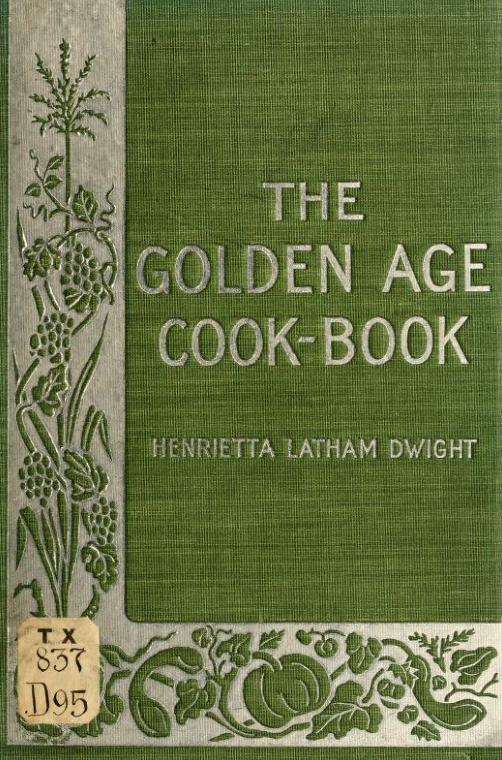
The Golden Age Cook-Book, 1898

Dwight authored an early vegetarian cookbook, The Golden Age Cook-Book, in 1898. The cookbook was lacto-ovo vegetarian and utilized "mock meat" recipes, such as mock chicken croquettes and mock fish soup. Her mock chicken recipe was made from breadcrumbs, eggs, lemon juice and walnuts. Dwight stated that meat eating was "not necessary to the perfect health of man".

=== Death ===
Dwight died during the diphtheria epidemic in Paris in 1909. She was buried in Mountain View Cemetery, California. In 1918, in memory of Dwight and her first husband, their children Edith and Milton Latham formed the Latham Foundation with the aim of promoting humane education and respect for all living creatures.

== Selected publications ==
- The Golden Age Cook-Book (1898)
