= Meat alternative =

Plant-based food made to resemble meat

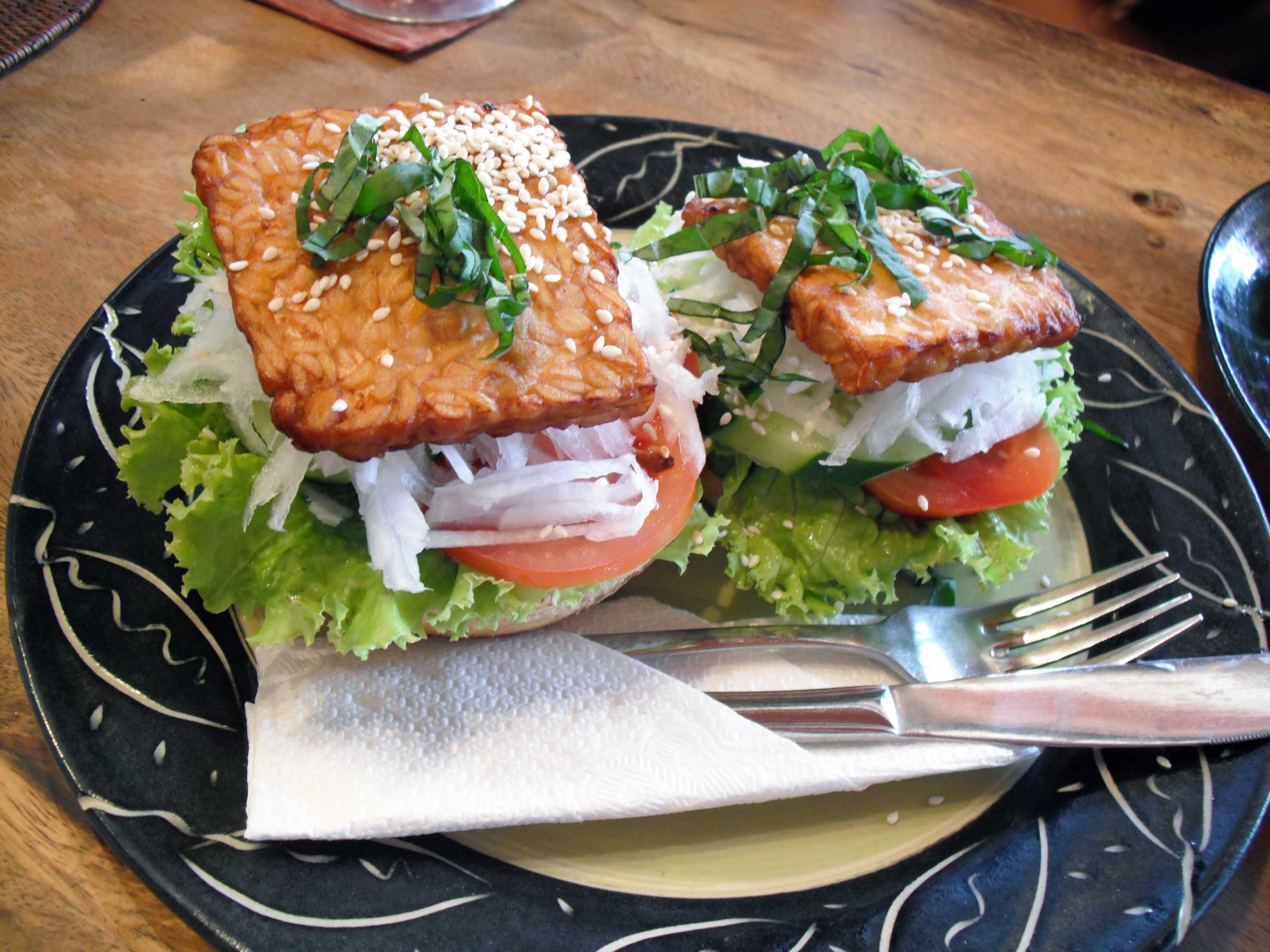
A tempeh burger

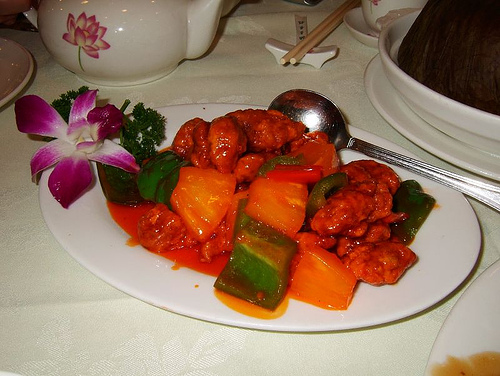
Chinese style tofu from Buddhist cuisine is prepared as an alternative to meat.

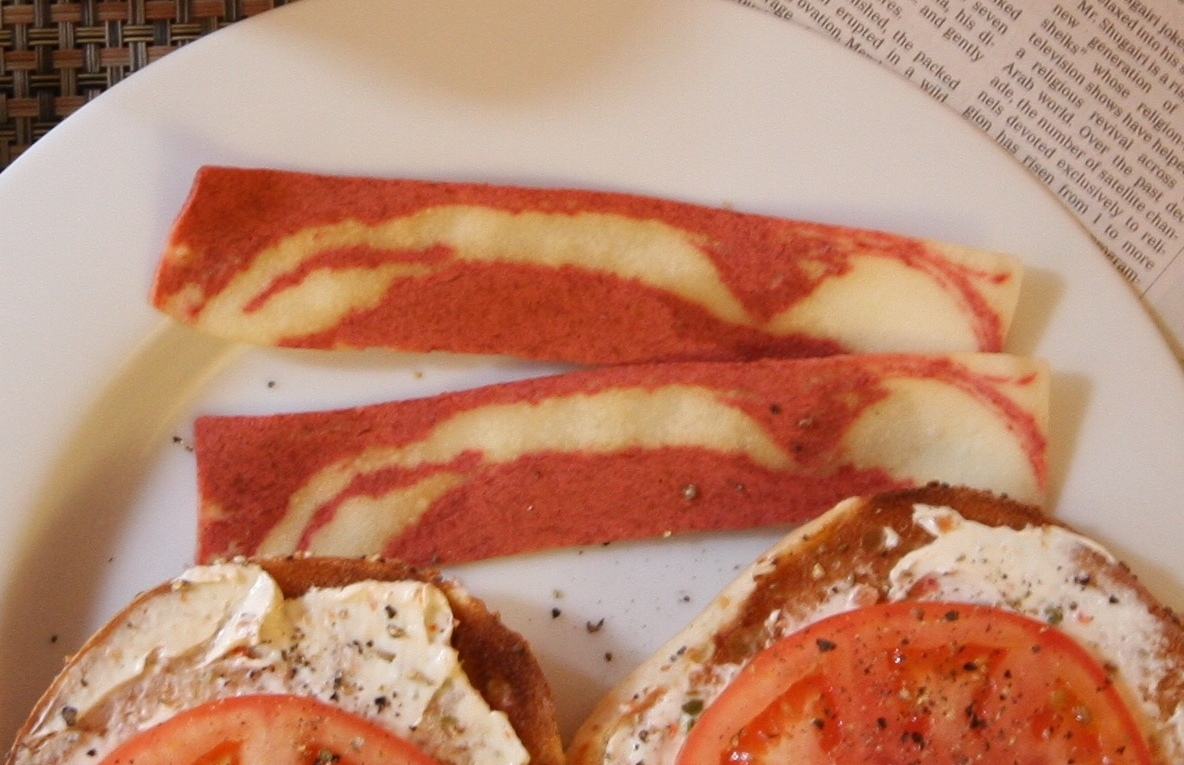
Two slices of vegetarian bacon

A meat alternative or meat substitute, also referred to as a plant-based meat, mock meat, or alternative protein, is a food product that is made from vegetarian or vegan ingredients and is consumed as a replacement for meat. The objective of meat alternatives is to replicate the qualities of meat, including its mouthfeel, flavor, appearance and nutritional values. Plant- and fungus-based substitutes are frequently made with soy (e.g., tofu, tempeh, and textured vegetable protein), but may also be made from wheat gluten as in seitan, pea protein as in the Beyond Burger, or mycoprotein as in Quorn. Alternative protein foods can also be made by precision fermentation, where single cell organisms such as yeast produce specific proteins using a carbon source; or can be grown by culturing animal cells outside an animal, based on tissue engineering techniques. The composition of meat alternatives varies widely by product and may include plant or fungal proteins, fats or oils, flavorings, binders and coloring agents.

Meatless tissue engineering involves the cultivation of stem cells on natural or synthetic scaffolds to create meat-like products. Scaffolds can be made from various materials, including plant-derived biomaterials, synthetic polymers, animal-based proteins, and self-assembling polypeptides. It is these 3D scaffold-based methods that provide a specialized structural environment for cellular growth. Alternatively, scaffold-free methods promote cell aggregation, allowing cells to self-organize into tissue-like structures.

Meat alternatives are typically consumed as a source of dietary protein by vegetarians, vegans, and people following religious and cultural dietary laws; however, global demand for sustainable diets has also increased their popularity among non-vegetarians and flexitarians seeking to reduce the environmental impact of animal agriculture. Life-cycle assessments generally find that plant-based meat alternatives have lower greenhouse-gas emissions than conventional meat products, although impacts vary according to ingredients, processing methods and production systems. Meat substitution has a long history. Tofu was invented in China as early as 200 BCE, and in the Middle Ages, chopped nuts and grapes were used as a substitute for mincemeat during Lent. Since the 2010s, startup companies such as Impossible Foods and Beyond Meat have popularized pre-made plant-based substitutes for ground beef, burger patties, and chicken nuggets as commercial products.

== History ==
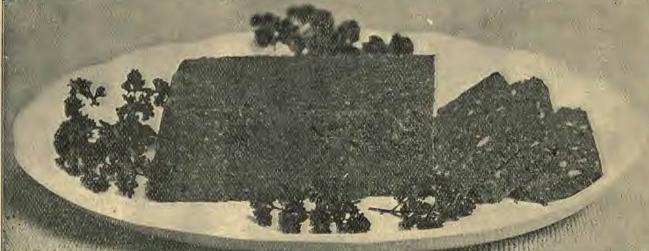
A nut and lentil roast from the Good Health journal, in 1902

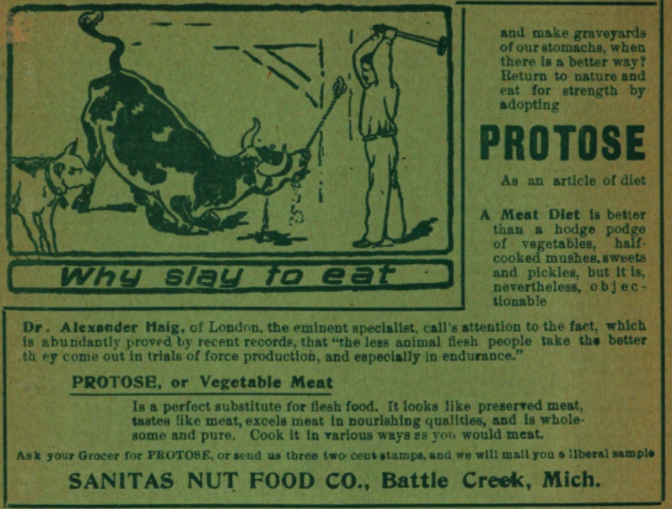
Advert for John Harvey Kellogg's Protose meat substitute, 1900

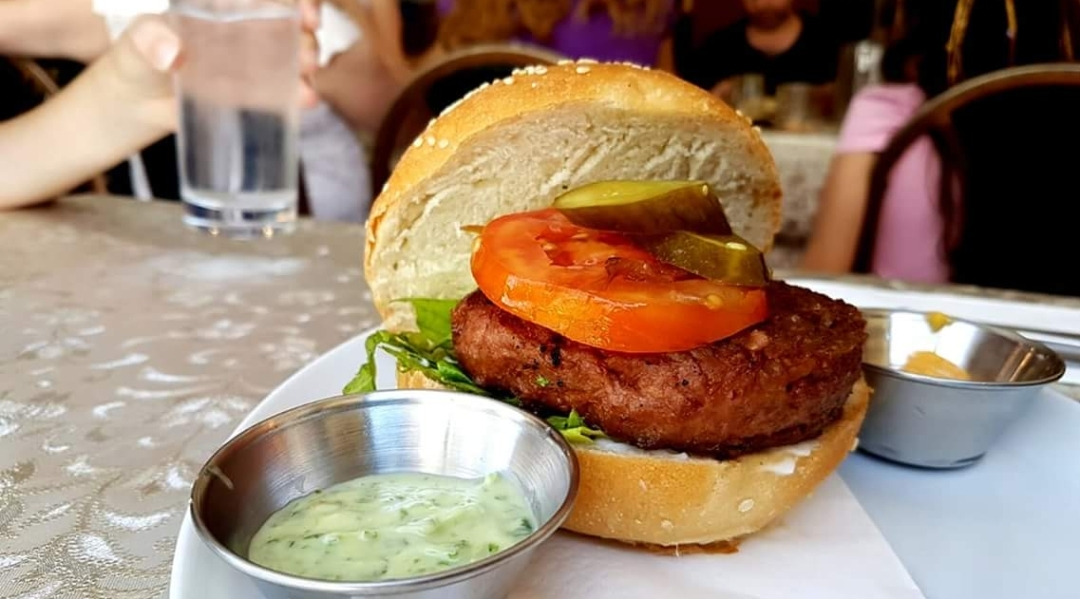
The vegan Beyond Burger from Beyond Meat

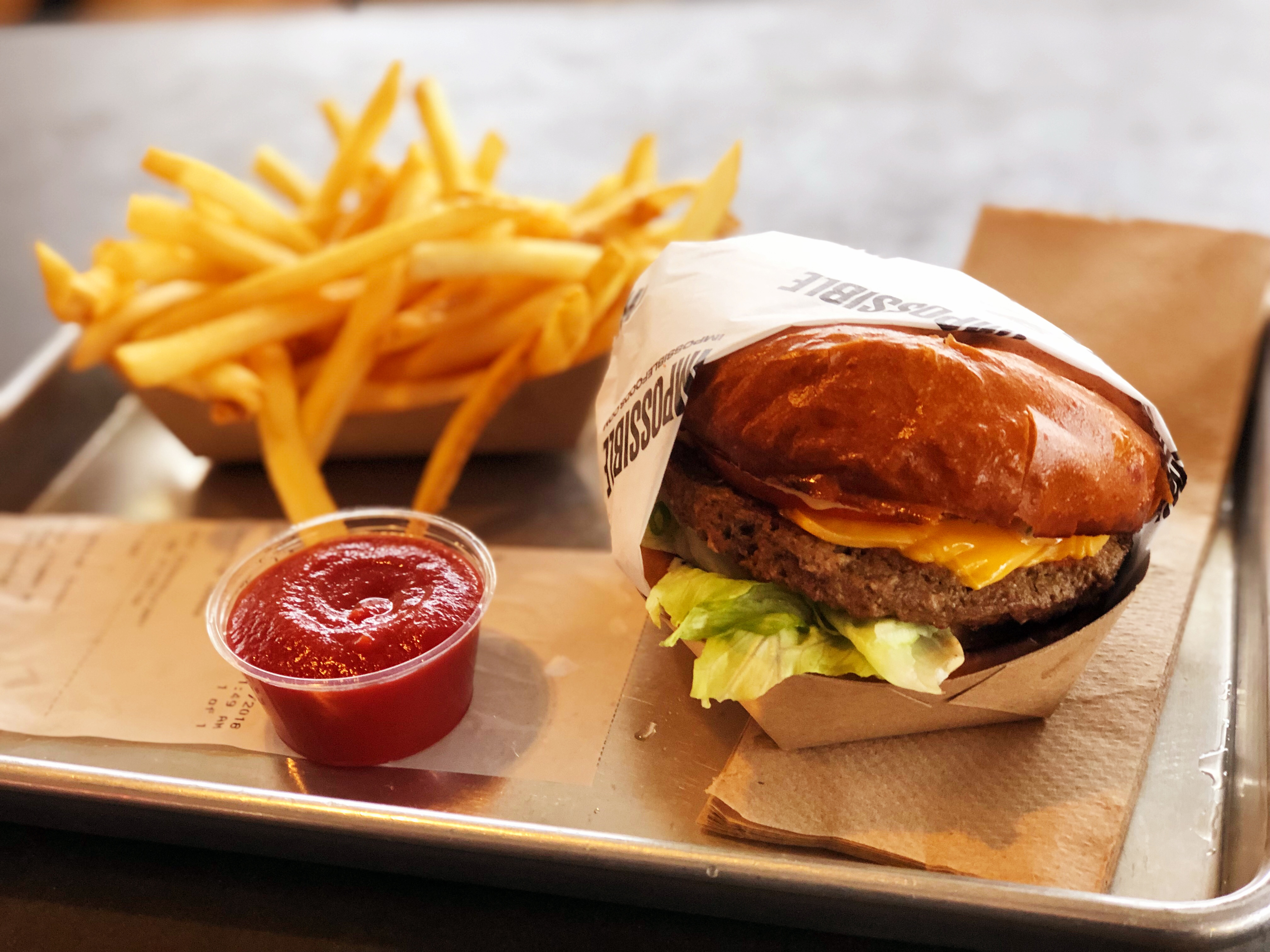
Cheeseburger made with a vegan patty from Impossible Burger

Tofu, a meat alternative made from soybeans, was invented in China during the Han dynasty (206 BC–220 CE). Drawings of tofu production have been discovered in a Han dynasty tomb. Its use as a meat alternative is recorded in a document written by Tao Gu (simplified Chinese: 陶谷; traditional Chinese: 陶穀; pinyin: Táo Gǔ, 903–970). Tao describes how tofu was popularly known as "small mutton" (Chinese: 小宰羊; pinyin: xiǎo zǎiyáng), which shows that the Chinese valued tofu as an imitation meat. Tofu was widely consumed during the Tang dynasty (618–907), and likely spread to Japan during the later Tang or early Song dynasty.

In the third century CE, Athenaeus describes a preparation of mock anchovy in his work Deipnosophistae:

He took a female turnip, shred it fine
Into the figure of the delicate fish;
Then did he pour on oil and savoury salt
With careful hand in due proportion.
On that he strew'd twelve grains of poppy seed,
Food which the Scythians love; then boil'd it all.
And when the turnip touch'd the royal lips,
Thus spake the king to the admiring guests:
"A cook is quite as useful as a poet,
And quite as wise, and these anchovies show it."

Wheat gluten has been documented in China since the sixth century. The oldest reference to wheat gluten appears in the Qimin Yaoshu, a Chinese agricultural encyclopedia written by Jia Sixie (Chinese: 賈思勰; pinyin: Jiǎsīxié) in 535. The encyclopedia mentions noodles prepared from wheat gluten called bo duo. Wheat gluten was known as mian jin (Chinese: 麵筋; pinyin: Miànjīn) by the Song dynasty (960–1279).

Before the arrival of Buddhism, northern China was predominantly a meat-consuming culture. The vegetarian dietary laws of Buddhism led to development of meat substitutes as a replacement for the meat-based dishes that the Chinese were no longer able to consume as Buddhists. Meat alternatives such as tofu and wheat gluten are still associated with Buddhist cuisine in China and other parts of East Asia. Meat alternatives were also popular in medieval Europe during Lent, which prohibited the consumption of warm-blooded animals, eggs, and dairy products. Chopped almonds and grapes were used as a substitute for mincemeat. Diced bread was made into imitation cracklings and greaves.

John Harvey Kellogg developed meat replacements variously from nuts, grains, and soy, starting around 1877, to feed patients in his vegetarian Battle Creek Sanitarium. Kellogg's Sanitas Nut Food Company sold his meat substitute Protose, made from peanuts and wheat gluten. It became Kellogg's most popular product as several thousand tons had been consumed by 1930.

There was an increased interest in meat substitutes during the late 19th century and first half of the 20th century. Prior to 1950, interest in plant-based meat substitutes came from vegetarians searching for alternatives to meat protein for ethical reasons, and regular meat-eaters who were confronted with food shortages during World War I and World War II.

Lentils were used at the turn of the century. In 1897, Food, Home and Garden published a positive review of London's vegetarian restaurants, claiming, "For fivepence one could get a lentil cutlet, which was very appetizing, and looked like a meat croquette".

Henrietta Latham Dwight authored a vegetarian cookbook, The Golden Age Cook-Book, in 1898 that included meat substitute recipes such as a "mock chicken" recipe made from breadcrumbs, eggs, lemon juice and walnuts and a "mock clam soup" made from marrowfat beans and cream. Dietitian Sarah Tyson Rorer authored the cookbook Mrs. Rorer's Vegetable Cookery and Meat Substitutes in 1909. The book includes a mock veal roast recipe made from lentils, breadcrumbs and peanuts.

In 1937, Tennessee-based Madison Foods introduced the Soy-Burger, an early commercial meat substitute made with soy and wheat gluten. It has been identified as the earliest known meatless burger commercially produced in the United States and was renamed Zoyburger in 1939.

In 1939, Worthington Foods began producing vegetarian protein foods in Worthington, Ohio, originally operating as the Special Foods Company. It became one of the early commercial manufacturers of meat alternatives in the United States, developing products such as the wheat-gluten-based Choplet. In 1943, Kellogg made his first soy-based meat analog, called Soy Protose, which contained 32% soy. In 1945, Mildred Lager commented that soybeans "are the best meat substitute from the vegetable kingdom, they will always be used to a great extent by the vegetarian in place of meat."

In July 2016, Impossible Foods launched the Impossible Burger, a beef substitute which claims to offer appearance, taste and cooking properties similar to meat. In April 2019, Burger King partnered with Impossible Foods to launch the plant-based Impossible Whopper, which was released nationwide later that year. By October 2019, restaurants, such as Carl's Jr., Hardee's, A&W, Dunkin' Donuts, and KFC were selling plant-based meat products. Nestlé entered the plant-based burger market in 2019 with the introduction of the "Awesome Burger". Kellogg's Morningstar Farms brand tested its Incogmeato line of plant-based protein products in early September 2019, with plans for a US-wide rollout in early 2020.

== Types ==
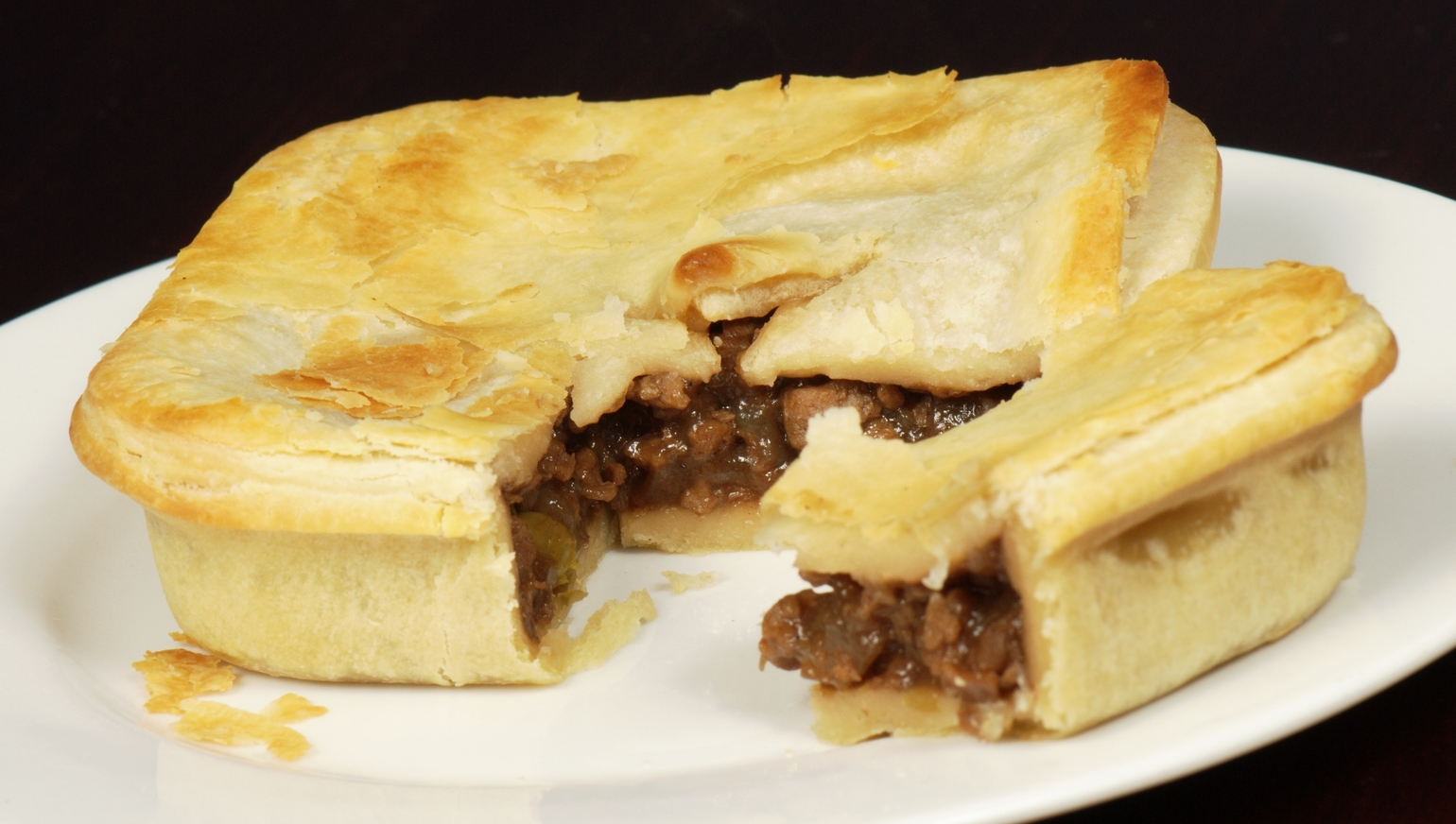
A vegan faux-meat pie, containing soy protein and mushrooms, from an Australian bakery

Some vegetarian meat alternatives are based on centuries-old recipes for seitan (wheat gluten), rice, mushrooms, legumes, tempeh, yam flour or pressed-tofu, with flavoring added to make the finished product taste like chicken, beef, lamb, ham, sausage, seafood, etc. Other alternatives use modified defatted peanut flour, yuba and textured vegetable protein (TVP); yuba and TVP are both soy-based meat alternatives, the former made by layering the thin skin which forms on top of boiled soy milk, and the latter being a dry bulk commodity derived from soy and soy protein concentrate. Some meat alternatives include mycoprotein, such as Quorn which usually uses egg white as a binder. Another type of single cell protein-based meat alternative (which does not use fungi however but rather bacteria) is Calysta.

== Production and composition ==
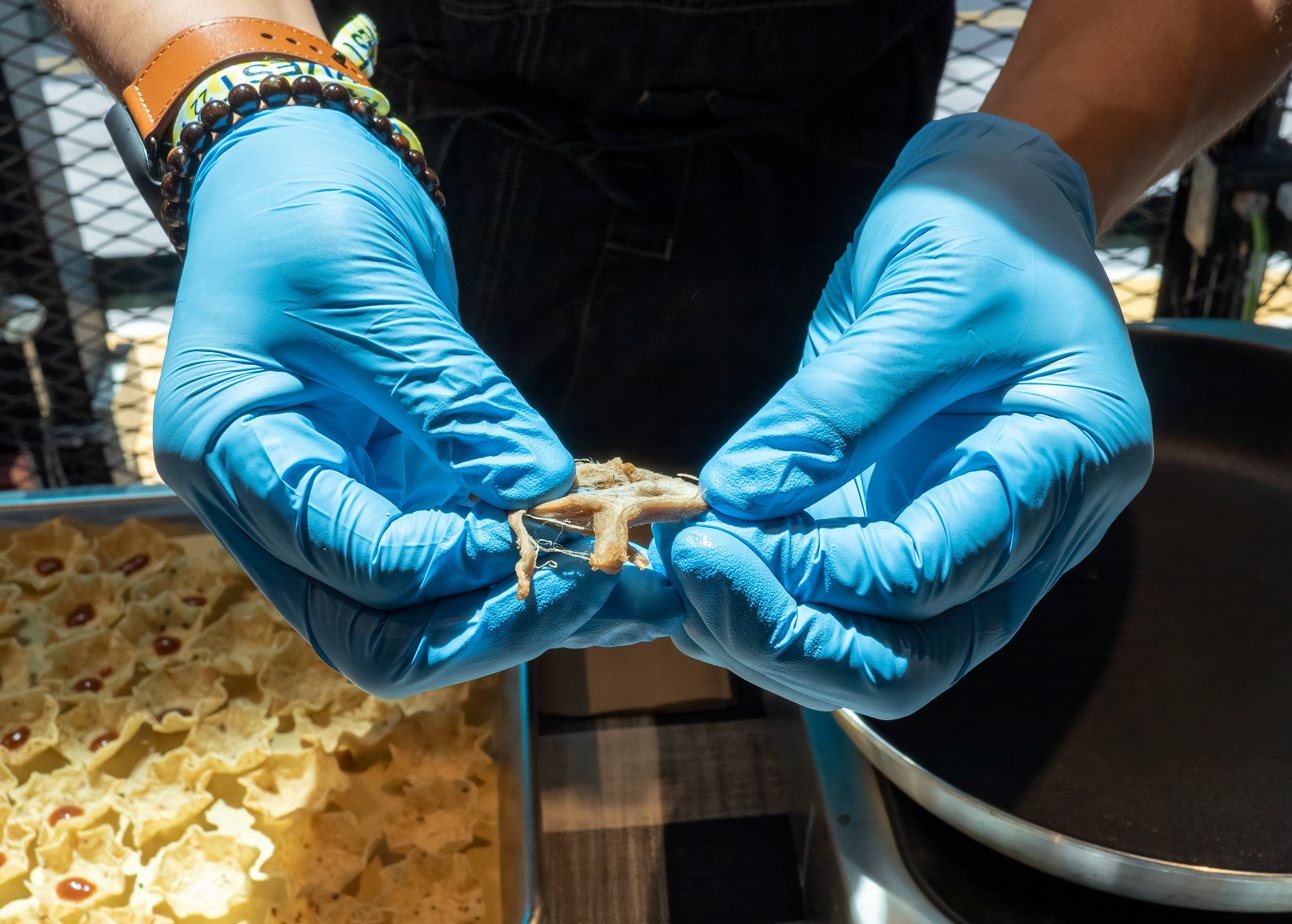
A plant-based pulled pork vendor demonstrating its texture

To produce meat alternatives with a meat-like texture, two approaches can be followed: bottom-up and top-down. With bottom-up structuring, individual fibers are made separately and then assembled into larger products. An example of a meat alternative made using a bottom-up strategy is cultured meat. The top-down approach, on the other hand, induces a fibrous structure by deforming the material, resulting in fibrousness on a larger length scale. An example of a top-down technique is food extrusion.

Both bottom-up and top-down processing can be used alone or in combination to offer various benefits. As discussed later, different meat alternative products have varying nutritional values. A notable advantage of the bottom-up approach is its ability to provide precise control over the composition and characteristics of the end product, allowing for optimized nutritional profiles. On the other hand, meat alternatives produced by top-down approaches may have limited malleability but are more scalable and can utilize available agricultural resources and infrastructure effectively. According to a study by Wageningen University & Research titled "Structuring Processes for Meat Analogues," Techniques that follow the bottom-up strategy have the potential to resemble the structure of meat most closely.". A cross-national survey conducted among meat-eaters with varying degrees of meat alternative consumption showed that those who consumed higher quantities of meat were more willing to switch to meat alternatives if they resembled authentic meat more accurately. Which can be accomplished through bottom-up approaches. The study concludes that sensory experience plays a crucial role in utilizing plant-based alternatives for heavy meat eaters.

The types of ingredients that can be used to create meat substitutes is expanding, from companies like Plentify, which are using high-protein bacteria found in the human microbiome, to companies like Meati Foods, that are cultivating the mycelium of fungi—in this case, Neurospora crassa—to form steaks, chicken breasts, or fish.

Soy protein isolates or soybean flour and gluten are usually used as foundation for most meat substitutes that are available on the market. Soy protein isolate is a highly pure form of soy protein with a minimum protein content of 90%. The process of extracting the protein from the soybeans starts with the dehulling, or decortication, of the seeds. The seeds are then treated with solvents such as hexane to extract the oil from them. The oil-free soybean meal is then suspended in water and treated with alkali to dissolve the protein while leaving behind the carbohydrates. The alkaline solution is then treated with acidic substances to precipitate the protein, before being washed and dried. The removal of fats and carbohydrates results in a product that has a relatively neutral flavor. Soy protein is also considered a "complete protein", as it contains all of the essential amino acids that are crucial for proper human growth and development.

After the textured base material is obtained, a number of flavorings can be used to give a meaty flavor to the product. The recipe for a basic vegan chicken flavor is known since 1972, exploiting the Maillard reaction to produce aromas from simple chemicals. Later understanding of the source of aroma in cooked meat also found lipid oxidation and thiamine breakdown to be important processes. By using more complex starting materials such as yeast extract (considered a natural flavoring in the EU), hydrolyzed vegetable protein, various fermented foods, and spices, these reactions are also replicated during cooking to produce richer and more convincing meat flavors.

== Commerce ==
In 2020, the world retail value of meat substitutes was 10.9% of the combined meat and substitutes market. The remaining 89.1% was meat. View source data.
Average price of meat substitutes worldwide from 2013 to 2025 with projections to 2030. Includes vegetarian and vegan meat substitutes. Prices were converted to USD using average exchange rates of the first year. View source data.

Meat substitutes represent around 11% of the world's meat and substitutes market in 2020. As shown in the graph, this market share is different from region to region. From 2013 to 2021, the world average price of meat substitutes fell continuously, by an overall 33%. The only exception was a 0.3% increase in 2020, compared to 2019. The price will continue to decrease, according to projections by Statista (see average price graph). Meat substitutes are often priced higher than comparable meat products, but the price can vary depending on product characteristics such as credence attributes or main ingredients.

The motivation for seeking out meat substitutes varies among consumers. The market for meat alternatives is highly dependent on "meat-reducers", who are primarily motivated by health consciousness and weight management. Consumers who identify as vegan, vegetarian or pescetarian are more likely to endorse concerns regarding animal welfare and environmentalism as primary motivators. Additionally, some cultural beliefs and religions place prohibitions on consuming some or all animal products, including Hinduism, Judaism, Islam, Christianity, Jainism, and Buddhism.

Vegan meats are consumed in restaurants, grocery stores, bakeries, vegan school meals, and in homes. The sector for plant-based meats grew by 37% in North America over 2017–18. In 2018–19, sales of plant-based meats in the United States were $895 million, with the global market for meat alternatives forecast to be $140 billion by 2029. Seeking a healthy alternative to meat, curiosity, and trends toward veganism were drivers for the meat alternative market in 2019. Sales of plant-based meats increased during the COVID-19 pandemic. The book The End of Animal Farming by Jacy Reese Anthis argues that plant-based food and cultured meat will completely replace animal-based food by 2100.

== Impact ==
=== Environmental ===
Besides ethical and health motivations, developing better meat alternatives has the potential to reduce the environmental impact of meat production, an important concern given that the global demand for meat products is predicted to increase by 15 percent by 2031. Research on meats and no-meat substitutes suggests that no-meat products can offer substantial benefits over the production of beef, and to a lesser extent pork and chicken, in terms of greenhouse gas production, water and land use. A 2022 report from the Boston Consulting Group found that investment in improving and scaling up the production of meat and dairy alternatives leads to big greenhouse gas reductions compared with other investments.

According to The Good Food Institute, improving efficiency of the Western diet is crucial for achieving sustainability. It has been projected that from the year 2010 to 2050 there will be a 41% increase in population along with a 53% increase in protein demand. As the global population grows, the way land is used will be reconsidered. 33% of the habitable land on Earth is used to support animals. Of all the land used for agriculture, 77% is used on animal agriculture even though this sector only supplies 17% of the total food supply. Plant-based meat can use a potential 47–99% less land than conventional meat does, freeing up more opportunities for production. Of the total water used in global agriculture, 33% goes to animal agriculture while it could be used for drinking water or other growing purposes under a different strategy. Plant-based meat uses 72–99% less water than conventional meat production.

Pollution is the next largest contribution to wasted water. Pesticides used in animal feed production as well as waste runoff into reservoirs can cause ecological damage and even human illness as well as taking water directly out of the usable supply. Animal agriculture is the main contributor to the food sector greenhouse gas emissions. Production of plant-based meat alternatives emits 30–90% less than conventional meat production. While also contributing less to this total pollution, much of the land being used for animal feed could be used to mitigate the negative effects we've already had on the planet through carbon recycling, soil conservation, and renewable energy production. In addition to the ecological harm caused by the current industry, excess antibiotics given to animals cause resistant microbes that may render some of the life-saving drugs used in human medicine useless. Plant-based meat requires no antibiotics and would greatly reduce microbe antibiotic resistance.

A 2023 study published in Nature Communications found that replacing just half of the beef, chicken, dairy and pork products consumed by the global population with plant-based alternatives could reduce the amount of land used by agriculture by almost a third, bring deforestation for agriculture nearly to a halt, help restore biodiversity through rewilding the land and reduce GHG emissions from agriculture by 31% in 2050, paving a clearer path to achieving both climate and biodiversity goals. The switch to plant-based protein is reported to deliver the biggest climate-heating emission cuts per investment dollar of all industrial sectors.

Unlike naturally occurring "plant-based" proteins (e.g. beans, nuts), engineered plant-based meat alternatives are more processed, thus producing some amount of waste. This high level of processing and additional ingredients such as spices and flavor that are added to create consumer-ready products that closely resemble meat increases the environmental footprint of plant proteins. Where reliance on meat alternatives can reduce the amount of land being used for livestock, these processed products require water use and environmental impacts similar to minimally processed meat products. 2019 research conducted at Loma Linda University found that a significant driver of water use and marine ecotoxicity was the production of plant-based meat alternatives. Marine ecotoxicity refers to toxins being released into nearby marine ecosystems from these processing practices that are directly or indirectly harmful to the organisms that inhabit the habitat. Additionally, meat analog production has contributed to adjacent marine and fresh water eutrophication, or excessive nutrient enrichment of these waters. Loma Linda's study reported that more than 90% of eutrophication and 70% of freshwater toxicity of observed areas could be attributed to the production of meat-alternative ingredients. Additionally, the formation of these ingredients into a consumer-ready product contributed further to the problem.

Results from a study featured in The International Journal of Life Cycle Assessment show that lab-grown meat and mycoprotein-based (protein derived from fungus) analogues have a higher demand for energy for medium cultivation than chicken, dairy-based, and other options. According to the study, most of the environmental impact from lab-grown meat production (75%) was due to the affected the environment essentially due to the energy consumption used for cultivation. The cultivation process nourishes stem cells in a nutrient-rich medium inside a bioreactor that essentially allows the growth of muscle and fat tissues outside a body (ex-vivo).

=== Health ===
Meat alternatives have lower amounts of saturated fat, vitamin B_{12} and zinc than meat products but higher amounts of carbohydrates, dietary fibre, sodium, iron and calcium. Meat alternatives are rated as ultra-processed foods under the Nova classification, but when the UK nutritional profiling system is used, not all products classified as ultra-processed are rated as unhealthy.

In 2021, the American Heart Association stated that there is "limited evidence on the short- and long-term health effects" of plant-based meat alternatives. The same year, the World Health Organization stated that there are "significant knowledge gaps in the nutritional composition" of meat alternatives and more research is needed to investigate their health impacts.

A 2023 review concluded that replacing red and highly processed meat with a variety of meat alternatives improved quality-adjusted life years, led to significant health system savings and reduced greenhouse gas emissions; replacement of meat with minimally-processed vegetarian alternatives, such as legumes had the greatest effect. Another review found that meat alternatives are likely to be healthier than meat products and more environmentally friendly but are more expensive.

A 2024 review found that plant-based meat alternatives have the potential to be healthier than animal source foods and have smaller environmental footprints.

A comprehensive study published in the journal Proceedings of the National Academy of Sciences in 2024 shows that processed plant-based substitutes such as veggie burgers improve nutrition compared to animal products, but less than unprocessed plant-based foods; they offer significant health benefits over meat, but are not as nutritious and balanced as unprocessed alternatives. A 2024 analysis in Proceedings of the National Academy of Sciences found that processed plant-based substitutes improve several diet-quality markers compared to meat, but remain nutritionally inferior to unprocessed plant foods.

== Criticism ==
Dietitians have claimed foods made by companies like Beyond Meat are not necessarily healthier than meat due to their highly processed nature and sodium content. However, among ultra-processed foods, consumption of the "plant-based alternatives" subcategory is associated with decreased risks of cardiometabolic diseases.

John Mackey, co-founder and CEO of Whole Foods, and Brian Niccol, CEO of Chipotle Mexican Grill, have criticized meat alternatives as ultra-processed foods. Chipotle has claimed it will not carry these products at their restaurants due to their highly processed nature. CNBC wrote in 2019 of Chipotle joining "the likes of Taco Bell ... and Arby's in committing to excluding meatless meats on its menu." In response, Beyond Meat invited Niccol to visit its manufacturing site to see the production process. Chipotle later developed its own "plant-based chorizo". In September 2022, Taco Bell also began adding plant-based meat alternatives to its menu.

Some consulting firms and analysts demand more transparency in terms of the environmental impact of plant-based meat. Through a survey, analysts from Deloitte discovered that some consumers negatively linked meat alternatives to being "woke" and politically left leaning. These ideas emerged in response to Cracker Barrel's introduction of Impossible Sausages in their restaurants in August, 2022. In 2021, 68% of consumers who purchased plant based meats believed it was healthier than animal meat. The number dropping to 60% in 2022, demonstrating a decline in consumers beliefs in the healthiness of these meats.

Some states have instituted legislation stating that meat alternatives are not allowed to label themselves as "meat". In Louisiana, the so-called, "Truth in Labeling of Food Products Act" was challenged by Tofurky, complaining of free speech violations and was successful on those grounds.

Alternative meats companies Beyond Meat and Impossible Foods have attempted to appeal to meat eaters. University of Oregon marketing professor Steffen Jahn thinks that this has run afoul of human psychology, saying "the mimicking of real meat introduces that comparison of authenticity." Jahn argues that marketing plant-based meats with traditional meats leads to an artificiality that many consumers do not love. Consumer psychologists split foods into categories of "virtue" and "vice" foods, which ultimately guide how products are marketed and sold. Virtue foods are those that less gratifying appealing in the short term, and typically healthier, whereas vice foods are the opposite, having more long term consequences. Many ready-made meat alternatives combine these categories with their long list of ingredients. Consumers who are likely to want to be "virtuous" by avoiding damage to the environment or animals are also likely to want "virtuous" food in the form of simple ingredients.

== See also ==
- Vegetarian bacon
- Vegetarian hot dogs
- Vegetarian sausage
- Meat-free sausage roll
- Soy curls – Soy-based meat alternative
- Cultured meat – Animal flesh produced by culturing cells
- Egg substitutes – Food products which can be used to replace eggs in cooking and baking
- Insects as food – Use of insects as food for humans
- List of bacon substitutes
- List of meat substitutes
- List of vegetarian and vegan companies
- Leghemoglobin: alters flavor of certain meat alternatives to make them taste even more similar to meat ("simulates" animal blood in these meat alternatives but made from plant-based sources)
- Milk substitute – Alternative substance that resembles milk
- Single-cell protein, meat alternatives containing protein extract from pure or mixed cultures of algae, yeasts, fungi, or bacteria or made from air
- Timeline of cellular agriculture
