= Mildred Lager =

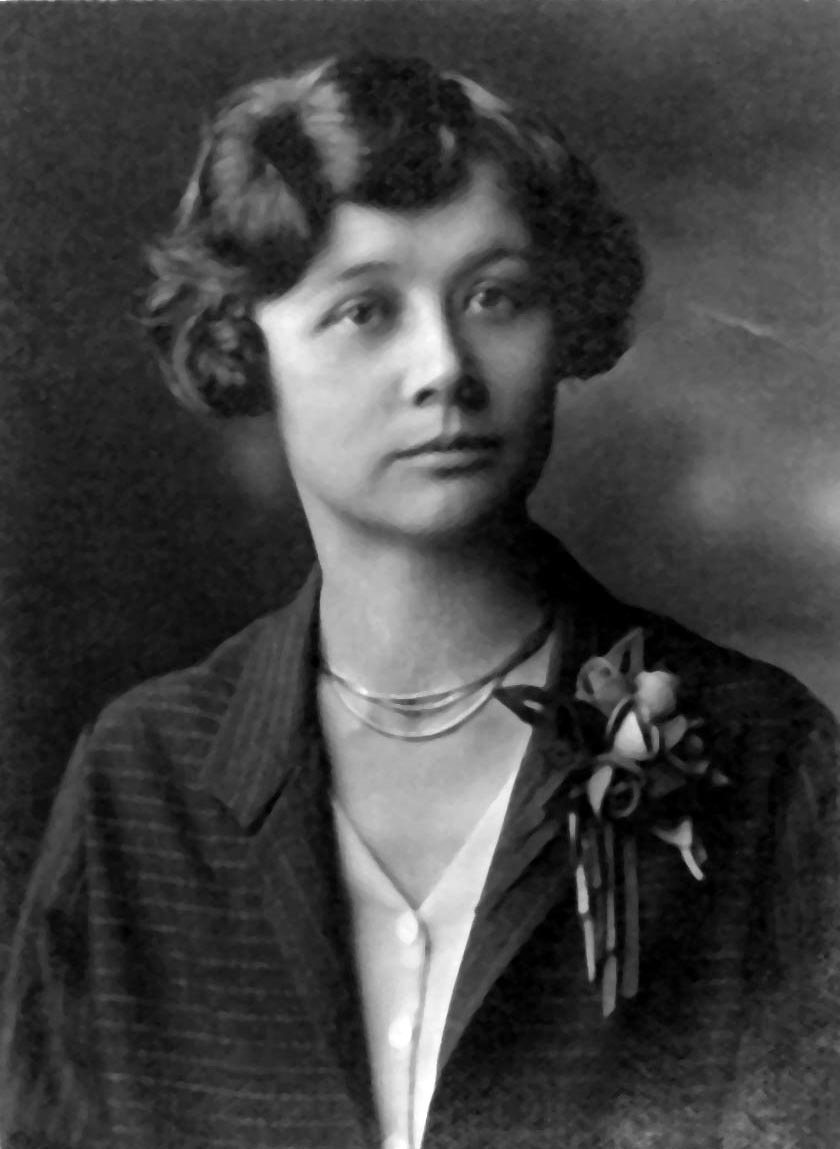
Lager in 1918

Mildred Mathilda Lager (December 19, 1900 – January 25, 1960) was an American writer and business owner known for her advocacy of natural and health foods.

== Life and career ==
Lager was born in West Superior, Wisconsin, the only child of Gustav Walfred Lager (a station engineer, who was born in Sweden) and Hilda Marie Erickson Lager (also born in Sweden). Gustav came to the United States in 1890 and Hilda in 1881. They were married on October 28, 1899, in Superior, Wisconsin.

On October 15, 1933, she founded a health food store named The House of Better Living at 1207 West Sixth St., Los Angeles, California. This store issued a regular newsletter and catalog.

Lager was notable for promoting soybean recipes. Her most well known book The Useful Soybean received positive reviews.

== Legacy ==
In 2009 she was the subject of a biography, Mildred Lager: History of Her Work with Soyfoods and Natural Foods in Los Angeles (1900-1960).

== Publications ==
- Soy Bean Recipes (1942)
- The Useful Soybean: A Plus Factor in Modern Living (1945)
- Soybean Cookbook (1968) [with Dorothea Van Gundy Jones]
