= Pea protein =

Food product and protein supplement derived from Pisum sativum

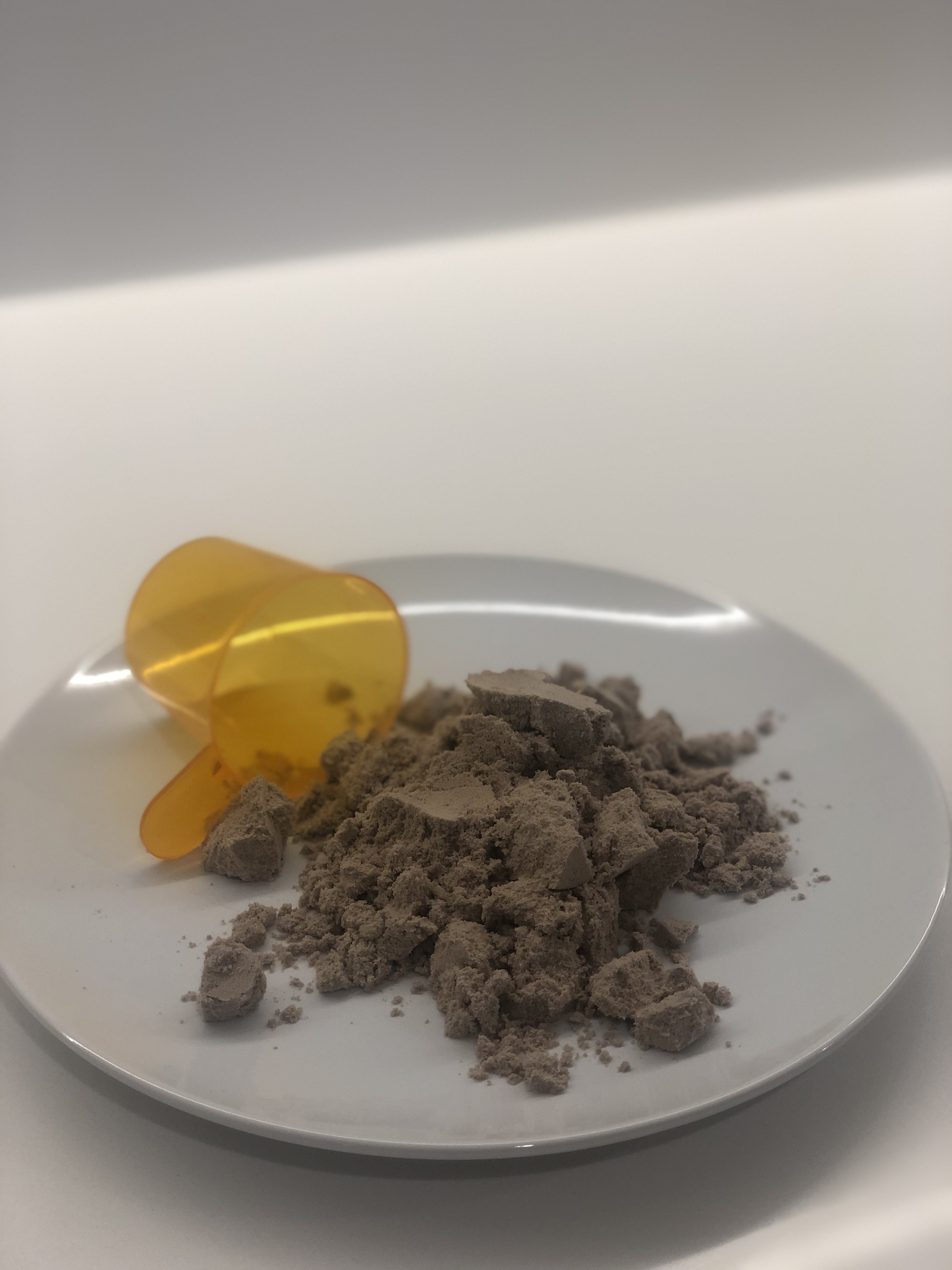
- Chocolate flavoured pea protein powder

Pea protein is a food product and protein supplement derived and extracted from yellow and green split peas, Pisum sativum. It can be used as a dietary supplement to increase an individual's protein or other nutrient intake, or as a substitute for other food products (e.g. the substitution of dairy milk by pea milk). As a powder, it is used as an ingredient in food manufacturing, such as a thickener, foaming agent, or an emulsifier.

It is extracted in a powder form and can be processed and produced in different ways:

- As an isolate - through the process of wet fractionation which produces a high protein concentration
- As a concentrate - through the process of dry fractionation which produces a low protein concentration
- In textured form, which is when it is used in food products as a substitute for other products, such as meat alternatives

Pea protein has low allergenicity and high nutritional value. It is common as a source of protein in vegan and vegetarian food, and in protein supplement products.

== Composition ==
Pea protein is rich in nutrients such as protein and carbohydrates. Pea protein also contains vitamins and minerals and is low in fat. While generally rich in protein, the actual protein content of peas is variable and influenced by both genetic factors and environmental factors (such as soil and climate in which the peas are cultivated).

Typically, peas contain 23.1–30.9% protein, 1.5–2.0% fat, and minor constituents such as vitamins, phytic acid, saponins, polyphenols, minerals, and oxalates. They also contain several classes of protein: globulin, albumin, prolamin, and glutelin. The proteins are mainly albumins and globulins, which account for 10-20% and 70-80% of the protein in the pea seed, respectively. The albumins are water-soluble and considered the metabolic and enzymatic proteins, while the globulins are salt soluble and act as the storage proteins for the seed. Globulins can be further classified into legumin and vicilin, which belong to the 11S and 7S seed storage protein classes, respectively. Legumin is a hexameric protein, and vicilin proteins are trimers. Pea protein is considered to be a complete protein, containing all the essential amino acids. However, it is not balanced, as it has high levels of lysine and threonine but relatively low amounts of sulfur-containing amino acids including cysteine and methionine.

Pea seeds contain 60-65% carbohydrates mainly composed of oligosaccharides, monosaccharides, polysaccharides, and disaccharides. The major carbohydrate fraction in peas is starch, which is the major storage carbohydrate in the cotyledons.

Peas also contain high levels of dietary fibre, which consists of cellulose, gums, hemicellulose, pectin, mucilage, lignin, and resistant starches. Dry pea has 17-27% dietary fibre depending on their cultivar, environment, and global growing region.

In terms of sugars, pea seeds contain 5-6% sucrose and raffinose. Sucrose ranges from 2.2% to 2.6%, whereas oligosaccharides, such as stachyose have a range of 1.3-3.2%, verbascose 1.2-4.0%, and raffinose 0.2-1.0% depending on cultivar and environment. The fat content of pea seeds ranges from 1.2% to 1.8% depending on the cultivar and about 25% of fatty acids are composed of oleic acid (18:1) and 50% of linoleic acid (18:2).

Pea seeds are also a rich source of minerals and vitamins, such as folic acid, riboflavin, pyridoxine, and niacin.

== Uses ==
=== Dietary substitute ===
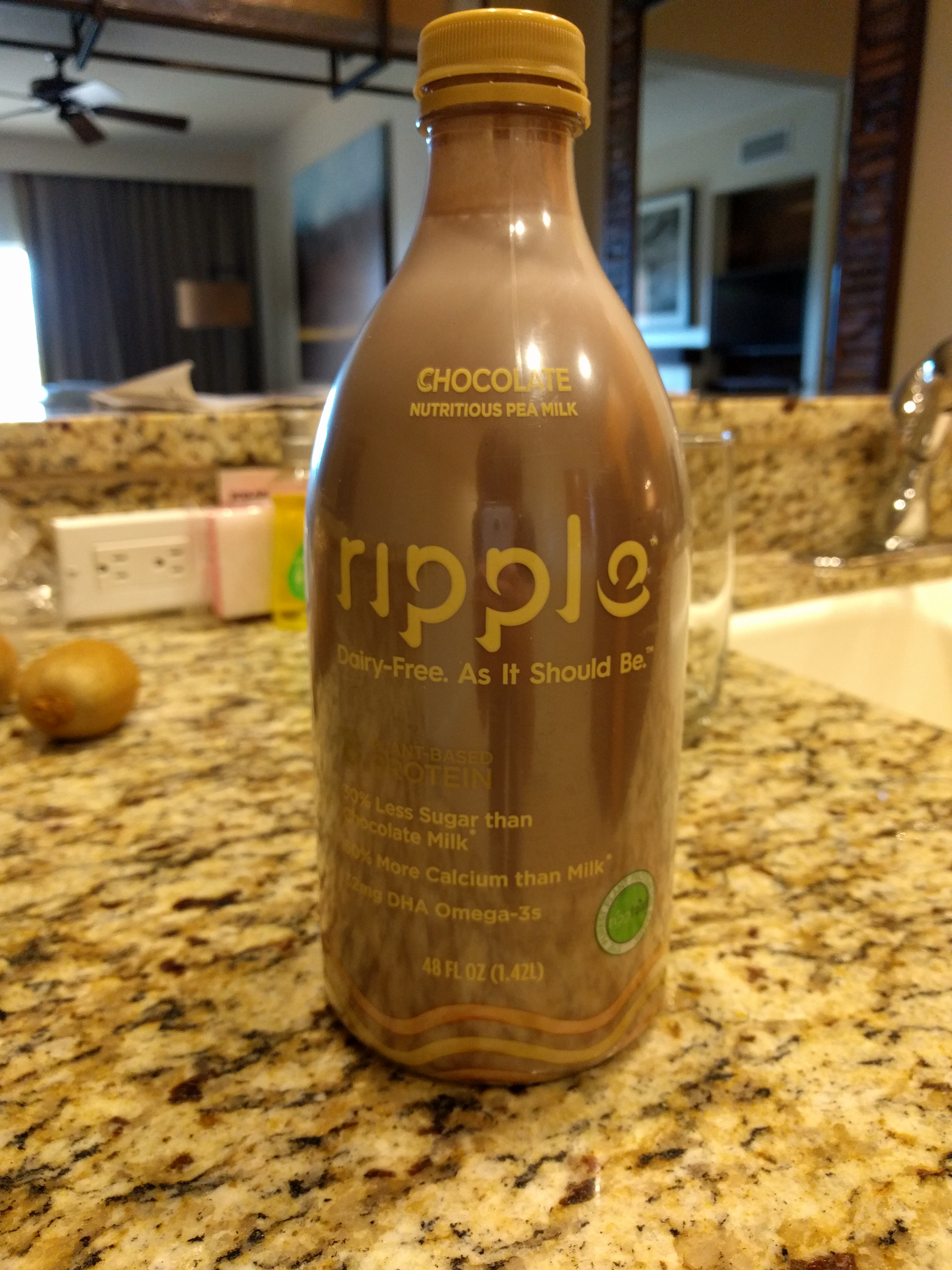
Ripple chocolate pea milk

Pea protein can be used as a protein substitute for those who cannot consume other sources as it is not derived from any of the most common allergenic foods (wheat, peanuts, eggs, soy, fish, shellfish, tree nuts, and milk). It may be used in baked goods or other cooking applications to replace common allergens. It is also processed industrially to form food products and alternative proteins such as alternative meat products, and non-dairy products. Manufacturers of alternatives produce a dairy alternative pea milk. Pea protein is also used in meat-alternatives and egg alternatives.

=== Functional ingredient ===
Pea protein is a low-cost functional ingredient in food manufacturing to improve the nutritional value and texture of food products. It can be used to improve the viscosity, emulsification, gelation, stability, or fat-binding properties of food. For example, the capacity of pea protein to form stable foams is a property used to enhance the production of cakes, souffles, whipped toppings, and fudges.

== Production ==
The manufacturing process of pea protein concentrates and isolates consists of protein extraction, purification, and drying. The industrial production of pea protein begins with the steps of cleaning and splitting the pea crop and then processing them further.

The cleaning process: Cleaning uses equipment such as indent cleaners, which are used to remove impurities. This process ensures that any allergens, such as wheat, barley and other seeds are removed, as these products contain gluten. If not removed, it would affect its classification as a gluten-free product.

The splitting process: Following cleaning, the pea is split and "dehulled" using a dehuller. The dehullers are a device that splits the pea seed and extracts the part of the whole seed which is the hull.

Further processing: Following the splitting process, the split peas are further processed either into starch, protein, and flour fractions.

Pea protein can be produced using two methods:

- The wet fractionation method; and
- The dry fractionation method.

=== Wet fractionation method ===
The wet fractionation method is used to produce pea protein isolates. Pea protein isolates generally contain a higher concentration of protein than pea protein concentrates. It involves the extraction of the protein at an alkaline pH. An alkaline pH is usually between pH 9.5-10.5. During the extraction of the protein, it is dispersed in water so that other components of the pea, such as carbohydrates, are also extracted via ultrafiltration or iso-electric precipitation. Isoelectric precipitation is where the dissolved proteins are precipitated out of the aqueous phase and separated in a decanter. This stage occurs at a pH of 4.0-5.0. The protein is separated from the by-products in a hydroclone. The precipitated protein (curd) is separated from the supernatant (whey) by filtration or centrifugation. The curd must be washed in order to remove residues of whey solubles. Subsequently, the pH is neutralised and readjusted to 7, and a dry protein isolate is obtained with a final mechanical drying step, called spray-drying.

=== Dry fractionation method ===
The dry fractionation method is used to produce pea protein concentrates. It involves dry milling technology; a traditional mechanical process used to reduce the particle size of split or whole peas into coarse or fine flours. The outer shell of the pea is first dehulled, which is then milled via impact or jet milling to produce a flour. This process relies on differential particle size and density within the milled flour. Once milled, air classification is used, to separate the smaller protein-rich fragments from larger starch-rich granules or fibre-rich particles. During this process, an air flow fluidizes the milled flour in a separation chamber. A classifier wheel submerged in the bed selects the small particles and allows these to form the fine fraction. Larger particles are rejected by the classifier wheel, leave the chamber at the bottom, and make up the coarse fraction. Dry fractionation is a more sustainable method of processing as it does not require the use of water and energy is not required to dry the protein.

== As food ==
Pea protein concentrates contain the branched-chain amino acids leucine, isoleucine, and valine.

=== Environmental impact ===
When compared to the extraction of other proteins such as whey and soy, the production of pea protein utilises fewer resources which can impact the environment, such as the use of water and fertilizers. Pea proteins require less water in their production and extraction process, making pea proteins a more environmentally sustainable food source than its counterparts. One study found that one kilogram of animal protein can only be obtained by feeding six kilograms of plant protein. Another study found that the water footprint per gram of protein for eggs, chicken meat, and milk is 1.5 times larger than for peas. In the case of beef, the water footprint per gram of protein is six times larger than for peas.

== Criticisms ==
Pea proteins have been criticized for their potentially bitter, metallic taste, caused by compounds called saponins. Depending on the method of processing, pea protein can have an undesirably gritty texture.

Depending on the method of processing, some pea proteins can contain high levels of anti-nutritional properties such as phytates, lectins, and trypsin inhibitors, which have negative side effects. Trypsin inhibitors decrease the digestion of the protein. Lectins can impede the uptake of glucose, decrease nutrient transport, and create damage to the mucosal layer of the intestines by binding to carbohydrate molecules. Phytates affect the bioavailability and digestibility of the protein by forming complexes with essential dietary minerals such as iron, zinc, and calcium, affecting their absorption.

== See also ==
- Pea milk
- Soy protein
- Bodybuilding supplement
- Whey protein
