= Milk substitute =

Alternative substance that resembles milk

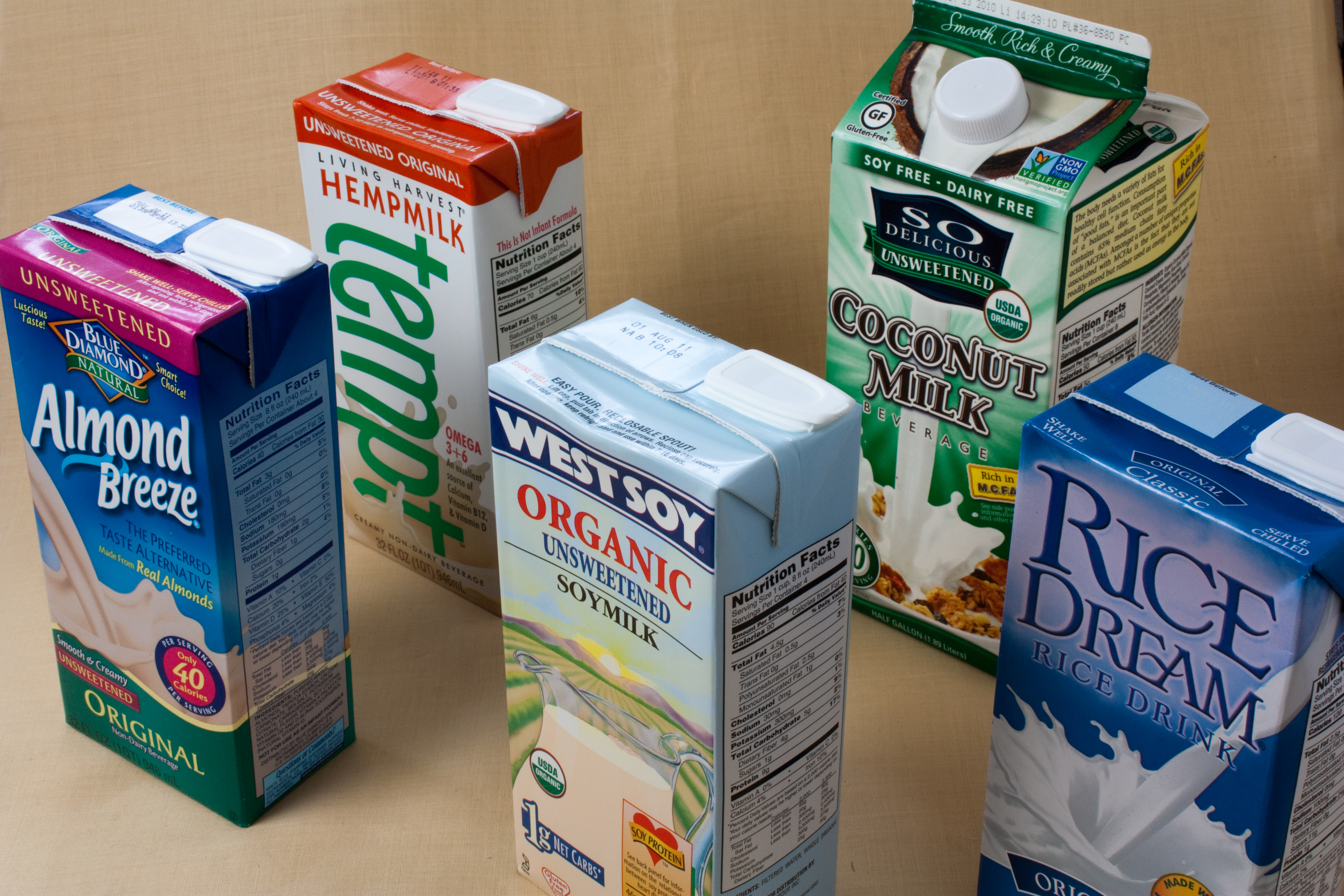
Packaged plant milks from an American grocery store

A milk substitute is a substance that resembles milk and can be used in the same ways as milk. The most common substitutes for adults are plant-based milks, which are made from ingredients such as soybeans, almonds, oats, rice, coconut and other plants. These products may be consumed as beverages or used in cooking, baking and coffee, and many commercial varieties are fortified with nutrients such as calcium, vitamin D and vitamin B12.

Other products used as alternatives to dairy milk include non-dairy creamers and specialized infant formulas intended for infants who cannot consume conventional cow's-milk-based formula. More recently, precision fermentation has also been used to produce dairy proteins without raising dairy animals; products made with these proteins differ from plant milks because they may contain proteins that are chemically equivalent to those found in cow's milk.

== History ==
Around the world, humans have traditionally consumed plant milks for hundreds, if not thousands, of years. The term “milk” has been used for plant-derived liquids since at least the Middle Ages. Coconut milk has a long culinary history in South and Southeast Asia, while almond milk was widely used in medieval European cooking. Soy-based beverages also have a long history in China.

In 2018, Benjamin Kemper wrote in the Smithsonian Magazine:

Linguistically speaking, using “milk” to refer to “the white juice of certain plants” (the second definition of milk in the Oxford American Dictionary) has a history that dates back centuries. The Latin root word of lettuce is lact, as in lactate, for its milky juice, which indicates that even the Romans had a fluid definition for milk. Ken Albala, professor of history at University of the Pacific and host of the podcast Food: A Cultural Culinary History, says that almond milk “shows up in pretty much every medieval cookbook.” Almonds, which originate in the Middle East, reached southern Europe with the Moors around the 8th century, and their milk—yes, medieval Europeans called it milk in their various languages and dialects—quickly became all the rage among aristocrats as far afield as Iceland.

Plant-based milk substitutes have grown rapidly in popularity since the start of the 21st century. Globally, consumption increased substantially during the 2010s. Factors associated with their growing popularity include increased adoption of plant-based diets, dietary restrictions such as lactose intolerance and milk allergy, perceived health and environmental benefits, and consumer taste preferences. Many milk substitutes now contain additives, such as thickening agents and flavors, to aid in taste and texture compared with dairy milk, as well as nutritional fortification.

== Fortification ==
Humans may consume dairy milk for a variety of reasons, including tradition, availability and nutritional value (especially minerals like calcium, vitamins such as B_{12}, and protein). Plant-sourced substitutes for dairy milk may be expected to meet such standards, though there are no legal requirements for them to do so. This may result in additives being put into milk substitutes to compensate for the absence of certain vitamins, minerals and/or proteins. Infant formula, whether based on cow's milk, soy or rice, is usually fortified with iron and other dietary nutrients.

In comparison with cow's milk, fortified milk substitutes have a comparable amount of calcium, however tend to fall behind in essential vitamin B_{12} and minerals such as iodine and iron. Legume milks, on average have comparable protein and energy levels to cow's milk, with grain milks, tree nut milks, and seed milks falling behind in this category.

== Non-dairy milks ==
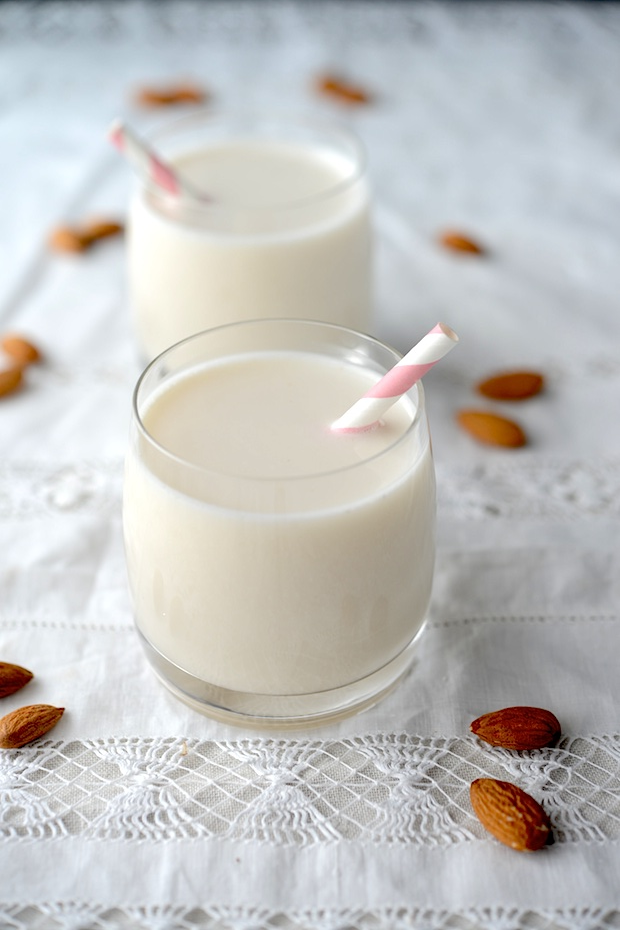
Almond milk

Plant milks are mass-produced fluids made from plant extracts and water. They are used as replacements for dairy milks as beverages and as cooking ingredients. Plant milks are particularly important to consumers who suffer from cow's milk allergies, lactose intolerances or hypercholesterolemia. Individuals who adhere to dairy-free diet patterns (e.g. vegan, Paleo, Whole 30) are also key consumers.

Coconut milk is made by mixing water with the freshly grated white inside pulp of a ripe coconut. Though considered by some in the West as a substitute for dairy milk, coconut milk has been used as a traditional ingredient in Southeast Asian, South Asian, Caribbean, and northern South American cuisines for centuries, if not millennia. It is also a source of calcium and vitamins C, E, B_{1}, B_{3}, B_{5}, and B_{6}. Coconut milk is usually very high in fat and calories, but low in protein, which makes it a good substitute for cream, as it can be whipped up in a similar fashion to decorate baked goods or desserts.

Almond milk is produced from almonds by grinding almonds with water, then straining the pulp from the liquid. This procedure can be done at home. Almond milk is low in saturated fat and calories. The market demand for almond milk has grown continuously throughout the 2010s and 2020s; this is accredited to the increasing number of health-conscious consumers coupled with rising inclination to incorporate more plant-based foods into the diet. Macadamia nut milk, cashew milk and hazelnut milk are similar commercially available nut-based beverages, but they are not as popular as coconut milk or almond milk.

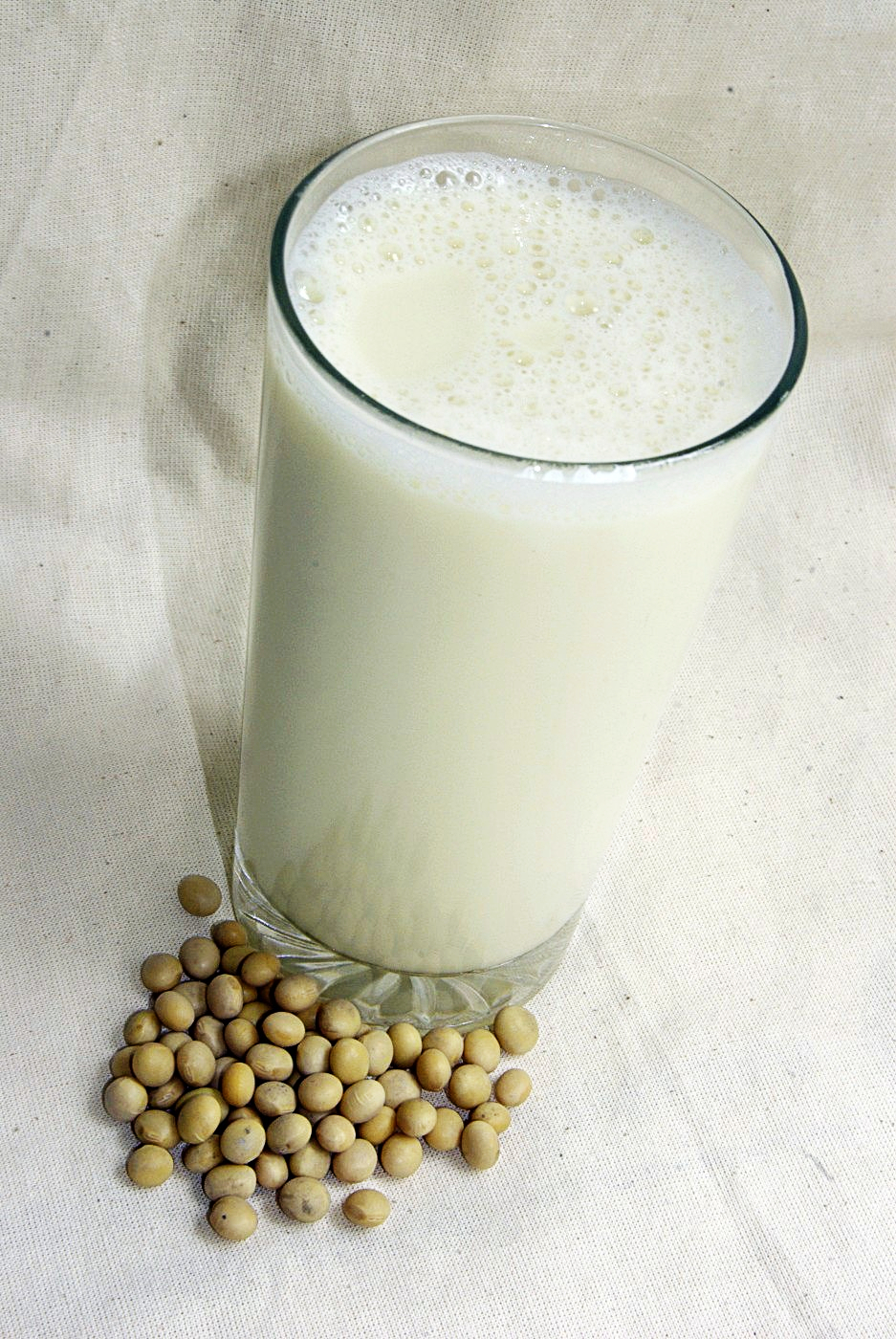
Soy milk

Soy milk is made from soybeans and contains about the same amount of protein as dairy milk. When enriched by the manufacturer, it may be a source of calcium and vitamin D and some B vitamins such as B_{12}; however, this is not in all brands of soy milk. According to one study, soy protein may be a substitution for animal protein to prevent and control chronic kidney disease. Peanut milk and pea milk made from yellow pea protein are two other legume-based beverages that can serve as alternatives to soy milk. Pea milk would be the least allergenic of the three.

Lupine milk is made from seeds of Lupinus mutabilis and contains 56% more protein than dairy milk.

Some milk substitutes use cereal grains instead of nuts or legumes. Oat milk is a relatively recently developed plant-based milk substitute. Different preparations are available for either direct consumption or to use in coffee. Oat milk has a smooth oatmeal flavour and is often supplemented with calcium and vitamins to be a viable vegan mammalian milk replacement. Oat milk is marketed as an environment-friendly alternative to almond milk. Rice milk is mostly used for baking because of its sweet taste, but in case of a nut or soy allergy a grain milk processed from rice may be preferable. When fortified, this milk can be a source of calcium, vitamin B_{12}, and vitamin D_{2}. In spite of its low allergenic potential, it's sometimes medically necessary to limit or avoid rice milk. Due to the levels of inorganic arsenic in rice milk, the UK's Food Standards Agency recommends against feeding it to infants, toddlers and young children.

Popular seed-derived milk substitutes include hemp milk and flax milk. They are made by grinding seeds with water, which are then strained to yield a nutty, creamy-flavored milk. Hemp milk is naturally rich in protein and amino acids. Chia milk and quinoa milk are also commercially available but these are less commonplace as they are considerably newer developments.

=== Fermentation-derived alternatives ===
Precision fermentation can be used to produce proteins traditionally obtained from animal milk without using dairy animals. In this process, engineered microorganisms are used to produce specific proteins, including casein and whey proteins, which can then be incorporated into foods formulated to resemble dairy products. Unlike plant milks, products made with precision-fermented dairy proteins contain proteins corresponding to those found in animal milk, although the proteins are produced by microorganisms rather than extracted from milk.

== Environmental impact ==
The environmental impacts of milk substitutes vary according to the plant source, agricultural practices, processing, packaging and transportation. A 2024 review of 70 life-cycle assessment and carbon-footprint studies found that plant-based milk systems generally had lower greenhouse gas emissions than animal-milk systems, although results differed among products and environmental indicators. For plant-based milks, processing, packaging and transportation were identified as important sources of environmental impact, while water use can also vary substantially between plant sources.

== Lactose intolerance ==
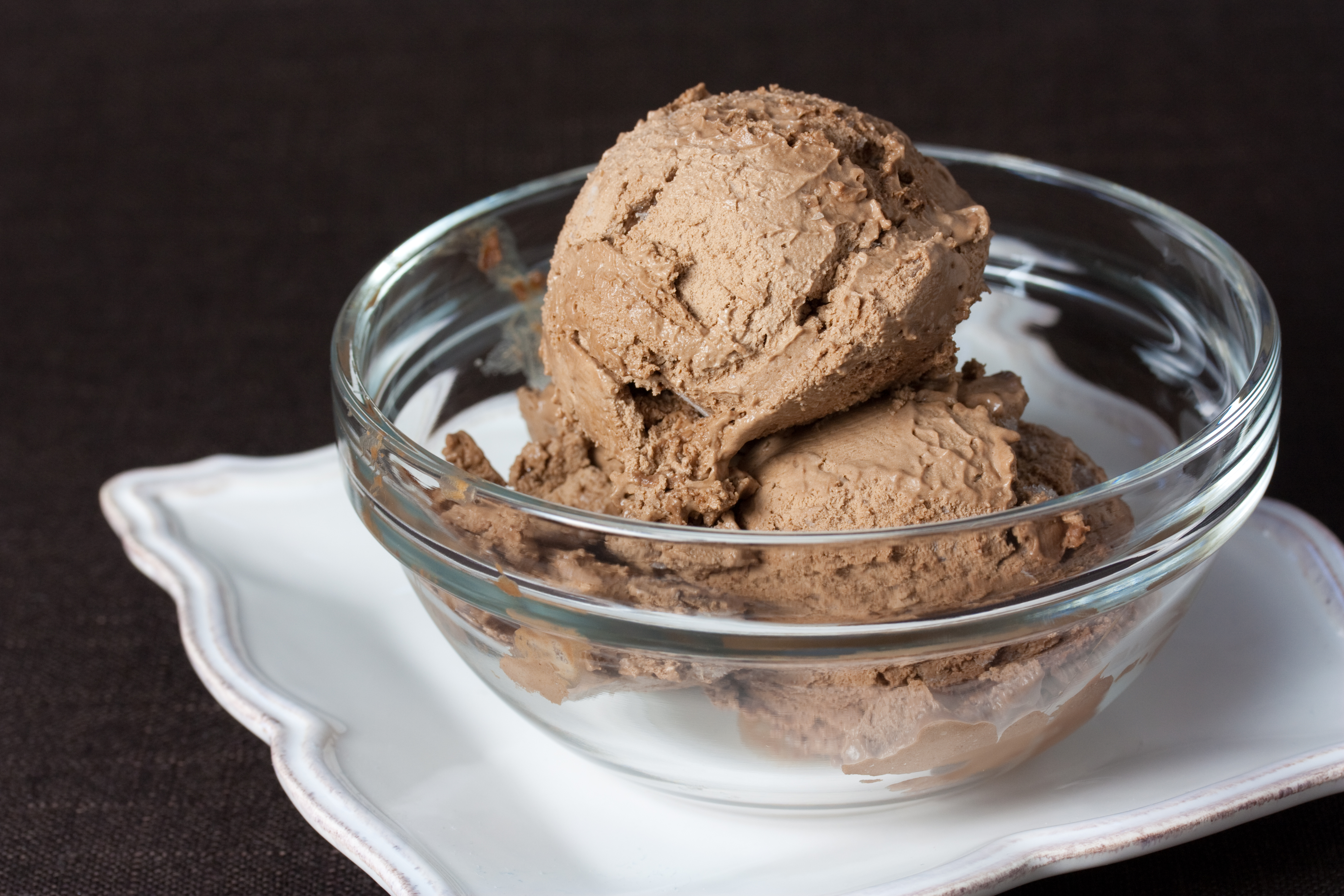
Dairy-free ice cream

Lactose is the major sugar found in dairy milk. Lactose intolerance refers to digestive symptoms that occur after consuming lactose in people with lactose malabsorption, a condition in which the small intestine does not produce enough lactase to digest all the lactose consumed. Symptoms may include bloating, diarrhea, gas, nausea and abdominal pain after consuming foods or drinks containing lactose. The prevalence of lactose malabsorption varies considerably among populations and is generally higher in many parts of Africa and Asia than in northern Europe. Not everyone with lactose malabsorption develops symptoms and therefore has lactose intolerance. In a modern Western context, food products are manufactured as dairy substitutes partly to cater to lactose intolerant individuals, including milk, yogurt, whipped topping and ice cream. A variety of traditional non-dairy beverages also exist in Asia and Africa, including amazake, douzhi, kunnu aya, kokkoh, poi and sikhye.

== Infant formula ==
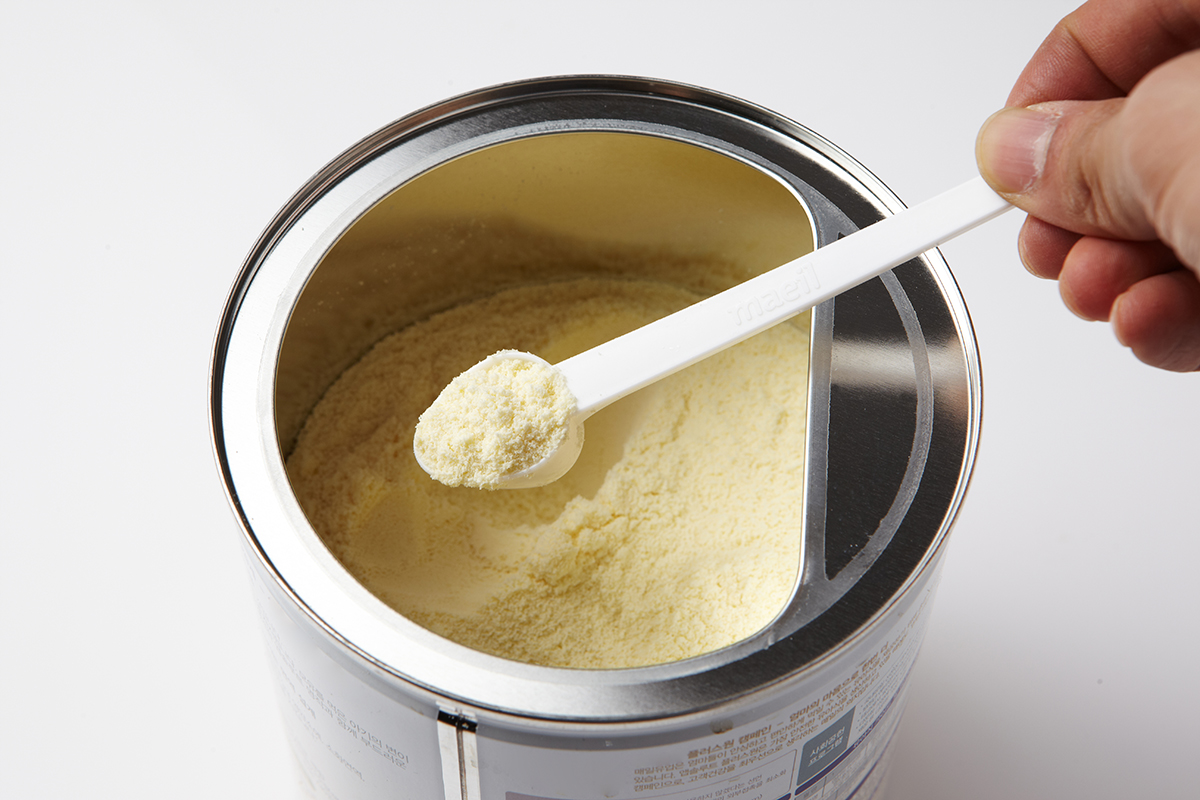
Infant formula

Commercial infant formula may be used as a sole or supplementary source of nutrition during infancy when human milk is unavailable or insufficient. Infant formulas may be based on cow's milk or soy protein, while specialized formulas include extensively hydrolyzed, amino-acid-based and, in some countries, hydrolyzed rice-protein formulas. Unlike ordinary plant-based beverages, infant formulas are specifically formulated to meet infants' nutritional requirements.

Ordinary plant-based beverages, including soy, oat, rice and almond drinks, are not substitutes for human milk or infant formula during the first year of life. Soy-based infant formula is distinct from soy milk and is nutritionally formulated for infants. For infants with specific medical or dietary needs, other specialized formulas may be used depending on the underlying condition.

Modern soy-based infant formulas are formulated to provide the nutrients required for infant growth and are supplemented with amino acids and other nutrients where necessary. They may be used in certain circumstances, although they are unsuitable for infants with soy allergy. For infants with cow's-milk allergy, extensively hydrolyzed cow's-milk formula is generally recommended as the first-choice therapeutic formula, while soy formula may be considered in some cases when it is tolerated.

Rice is one of the lesser allergenic alternatives, and hydrolyzed hypo-allergenic rice-based formulae has been developed which have also been fortified with necessary nutritional substitutes. However, rice milk formulae are still not recommended for young children as a second choice to cow's milk formula or breast milk due to arsenic levels.

For more information about choosing infant formulas, please consult your pediatrician and the guidelines recommended by associations such as The American Academy of Pediatrics.

== Nutrition ==
The nutritional composition of plant-based milk alternatives varies considerably depending on the plant source, processing methods, fortification and other added ingredients. Products made from soy, oats, almonds and other plants can differ substantially in their amounts of protein, fat, carbohydrates, added sugars, vitamins and minerals. In the United States, fortified soy beverages are the only plant-based milk alternatives currently included in the dairy group of the federal Dietary Guidelines because their overall nutrient composition is considered sufficiently similar to dairy milk.

Commercial plant-based milk alternatives are often fortified with nutrients such as calcium and vitamin D, but fortification practices and nutrient levels vary among products. Some fortified products may contain amounts of calcium comparable to dairy milk, while unfortified products may contain substantially less.

== See also ==
Specific dairy substitutes:

- Cheese analogue
- Non-dairy creamer
- Margarine
- Perfect Day (company)
- Plant cream
- Plant milk
- Vegan cheese
- Vegan yogurt

Other substitutes:

- Coffee substitute
- Egg substitutes
- Meat analogue
- Salt substitute
- Sugar substitute
