= Soy milk maker =

Small kitchen appliance

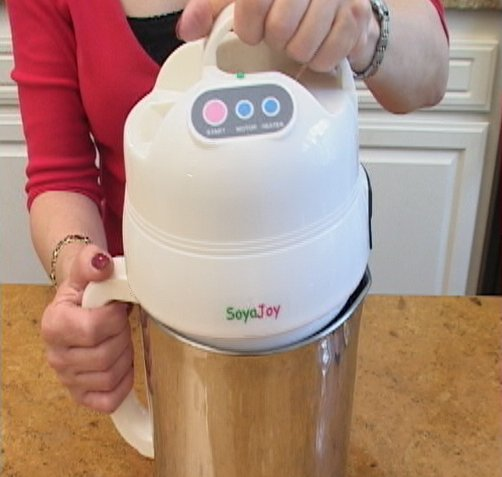
Sample of one of the many different kinds of soy milk makers

A soy milk maker is a small kitchen appliance which automatically cooks soy milk, a non-dairy beverage made from soy beans. Soy milk makers work similarly to a combination between a home blender and an automatic coffee maker. Some soy milk makers can also be programmed to make almond milk, rice milk, and other vegetable-based steeped beverages.

Homemade soy milk can be made to the drinkers' tastes and nutritional requirements. The soy pulp that remains as a by-product of soy milk preparation is called okara (Japanese), dòuzhā (Chinese), or kongbiji (Korean), and is an ingredient in many recipes.

Ordinary methods for making soy milk at home are often very labor-intensive (requiring beans to be soaked, ground in a blender, strained, and then cooked). Soy milk machines perform many of these steps automatically, simplifying home-based soy milk production.

== Standard operation ==
Before use, dried beans are rinsed with water to remove particulate debris, soaked for 6–10 hours to moisten and soften the dried beans, and then rinsed again before use. The moistened soy beans are placed into the grinding chamber, where they are ground into a fine paste, and fall into a finely screened strainer chamber immersed in a pot of water.

The paste is steeped in the water in a process similar to that of tea making; the pot of water is heated, fully cooking both the dissolved soy milk and the strained soy solids, which become soy pulp. The new models on the market now have no filter cup—soy beans are placed directly inside the machine jug.

Most soy milk makers include a mechanism to stop the boiling soy milk from overflowing. The heater is turned off as the water level approaches the top of the chamber, and then turned back on as the soy milk returns to an acceptable level. This process is repeated for the length of the cooking period, which lasts for approximately fifteen minutes.

When the soy milk has fully cooked, the machine will automatically turn off, leaving the soy pulp in the filter cup and the soy milk in the water chamber. Many machines will beep to inform the user of the soy milk's completion.

== See also ==
- List of cooking appliances
- Plant milk
- Soy milk
