= Pea milk =

Plant milk made from pea protein

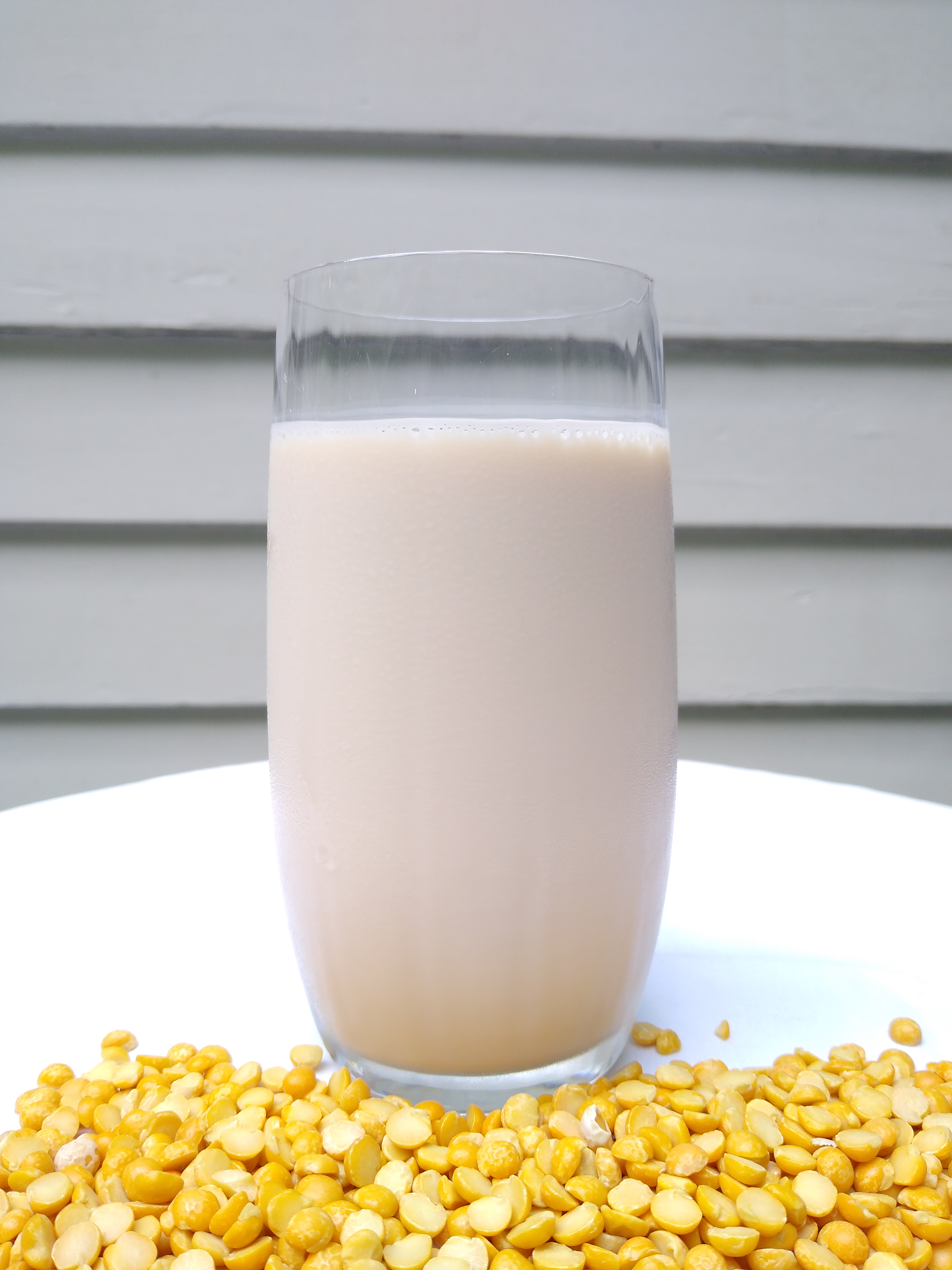
- Food energy (per serving): 70 kcal (290 kJ)
Nutritional value
(per serving)
- Protein: 8 g
- Fat: 4.5 g
- Carbohydrate: 0 g

Pea milk (also known as pea protein beverage) is a type of plant milk. It is made using pea protein extracted from yellow peas, usually in combination with water, sunflower oil, micronutrients added for food fortification, thickeners, and phosphates. Commercial pea milk typically comes in sweetened, unsweetened, vanilla and chocolate flavors. It is marketed as a more environmentally-friendly alternative to almond milk and a non-GMO alternative to soy milk. It is a suitable product for people with soy allergies.

Like other plant milks, pea milk is perceived to be environmentally sustainable and requires less water than the production of dairy milk. There is currently limited information on the total carbon emissions and water consumption of producing ready-to-drink pea milk. Plain pea milk is described to have an off-white colour, a creamy texture, and a thick consistency. Unsweetened pea milk in particular is noted for having a savoury, "pea-like" flavour.

== History ==
Pea milk was introduced in the UK retail market by the brand Mighty Society, and in Australia by the Freedom Foods Group. It was introduced in the US Whole Foods Markets in 2015 by Ripple. By 2018, pea milk was available in more than 10,000 stores in the US. Major consumer product company Nestlé released its own version of the drink, called Wunda, in 2021.

== Production ==
Plant milk is made through crushing the plant source and extracting the liquid. Pea milk in Australia is made through a process of soaking yellow split peas and blending with water.

Pea milks are fortified, which may include addition of various micronutrients, such as vitamin D2 and vitamin B12 to the milk during manufacturing.

As per research, plant-based milk alternatives' taste can be improved by fermentation and can increase the levels of Vitamin Bs and protein.

== Composition and nutritional values ==
Using RDI (Reference Daily Intake) as a measurement, commercially available pea milk in the US contains 13% of potassium, 10% of vitamin A, 30% of vitamin D, 15% of iron, along with 4.5 grams of fat (from sunflower or other seed oils used in manufacturing), and provides 290 kilojoules (70 kilocalories) per 240 millilitres (8 US fl oz) (unsweetened, original flavour).

According to food fortification used during manufacturing, pea milk may contain various added micronutrients, such as vitamin B3, B6, B12, calcium, and protein. Some types of pea milk contain algal oil, which contains omega-3 fatty acids.

== Other potential uses ==
Milk with pea proteins can be included in infant formula. Pea protein powders have been developed and are being sold to meet the demand for high-protein diets.

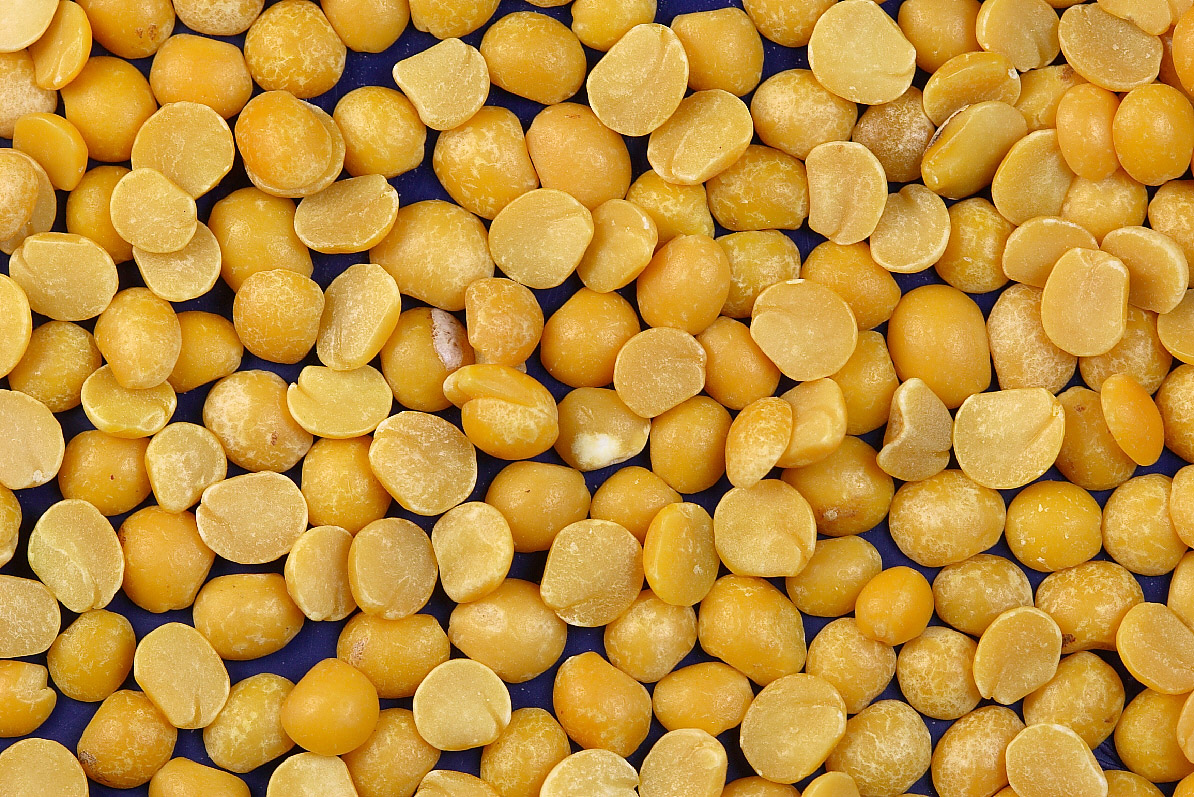
Yellow split pea used to produce pea milk.

== Environmental impact ==
As an alternative to milk, pea milk has growing market interest due to the perceived benefits that it is ecologically sustainable. It requires 100 times less water to produce than almond milk, and 25 times less water than dairy milk. Another source has stated that pea crops require six times less water than almond crops. The growing of pea crops also results in increased nitrogen levels in the soil and does not require extensive irrigation. Overall, the production of peas does not require the same level of water, nitrogen fertilisers and emissions of greenhouse gases as producing dairy milk.

== See also ==
- Almond milk
- Coconut milk
- Oat milk
- Plant milk
- Soy milk
- Split pea
