= Poi =

Poi or POI may refer to:

== Art and culture ==
- Poi (film), a 2006 Indian Tamil-language film by K. Balachander
- Poi (dessert), a traditional banana dessert from Samoa
- Poi (Hawaiian food), the traditional staple food in native cuisine of Hawaii
- Poi (performance art), a style of performing art
- Sierra Popoluca language, ISO 639-3 language code poi
- Poi (video game), a 2017 independent video game

== Places ==
- Poi, Pakistan
- Poi, Ukhrul, India
- Poi, Wallis and Futuna
- Poi, a Tibetan pinyin representation of Tibet

== Politics ==
- Independent Workers' Party (Parti ouvrier indépendant, POI), a French Marxist political party
- Internationalist Workers Party (Parti ouvrier internationaliste, POI), a French Trotskyist political party

== Other uses ==
- Apache POI, a project run by the Apache Software Foundation
- Hawaiian Poi Dog, an extinct breed of dog
- Person of interest (disambiguation)
- Point of interaction (POI), a component in point of sale equipment
- Points of interconnect (POI), in the Australian National Broadband Network
- Point of interest, a specific point location that someone may find useful or interesting
- Point of interface (POI), in telecommunications
- Primary ovarian insufficiency (POI), partial or total of function of the ovaries
- Proof of insurance (POI), a document that proves that a person has valid insurance
- Point of information (competitive debate)

== See also ==
- Postorgasmic illness syndrome (POIS)
