= Kokkoh =

Infant formula broth

Kokkoh is an infant formula broth made from whole grains, seeds and legumes lightly toasted and ground to a powder. It was first brought to Western culture by Sakura Nyoichi, better known as George Ohsawa, as part of the Macrobiotic diet, based on a recipe widely used in traditional Japan. Brown rice is its primary and can be its only solid ingredient. Many kokkoh recipes include other whole grains, seeds and seasonings, most commonly sweet rice, azuki beans, sesame seeds, oats, barley, soybeans and kombu.

== Preparation ==
Broadly speaking, the term "kokkoh" may be applied to any dish in which cereals are diluted in water. However, the rice dish discussed here is by far the most common form.

No matter which cereals are used in a kokkoh recipe, preparation is similar and simple. The cereals are soaked in water for two to three hours. Additional water is then added, and the mixture boiled or pressure cooked to completion. In some cases, the cereals are toasted in a dry skillet, or roasted in sesame oil before cooking takes place.

== Uses ==
Kokkoh is recommended as both a substitute for mother's milk and a means of weaning infants from it. (In the former case the recipe often calls only for brown rice ground to a fine powder and water.) Besides its soft and easily digestible texture, kokkoh is recommended as such because its mixture has a high and varied protein content; combined, the amino acids in each of the ingredients described at the outset include virtually all those needed for consumption. It is thus especially well suited for the growth needs of a child. When used solely for weaning, it is recommended that kokkoh be introduced at between 8 months and a year of age. It may be used as breast milk substitute as early as five months, but with a larger proportion of water, in order to further dilute the mixture.

Kokkoh is also an important part of the macrobiotic diet, in accordance with the diet's heavy emphasis upon grains. Along with its use as a means of weaning, kokkoh is a common breakfast food among macrobiotic eaters of all ages.

If kokkoh is used as a milk replacement for infants, it can lead to unnatural weight gain and iron or vitamin B12 deficiencies.

== See also ==
- Grain milk
- Plant milk
