= Soy yogurt =

Yogurt-like product prepared with soy milk

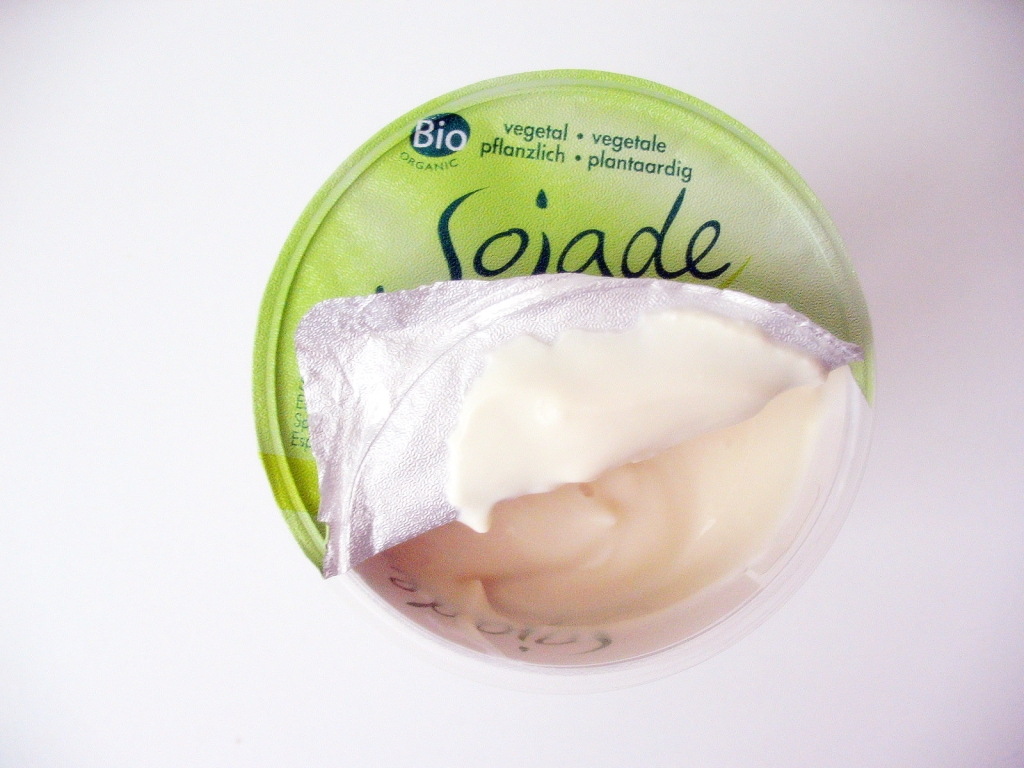
- Alternative names: Soya yogurt, soygurt, yofu
- Type: Yogurt
- Main ingredients: Soy milk, culture

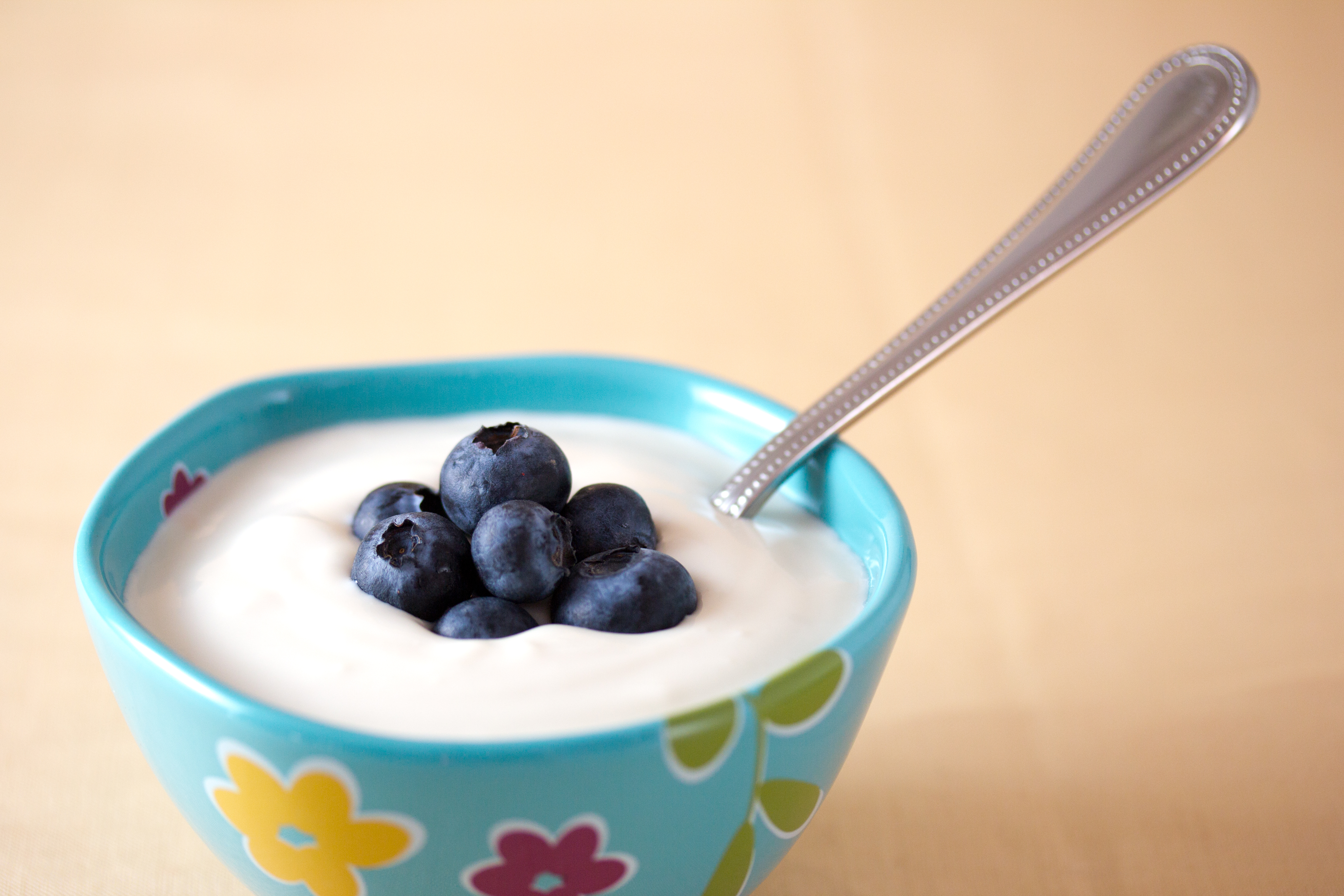
Soy yogurt served with blueberries

Soy yogurt, also referred to as soya yogurt, soygurt or yofu (a portmanteau of yogurt and tofu), is a yogurt-like product made with soy milk.

== Composition ==
Soy yogurt may have a slight beany soy taste when made directly from freshly prepared soy milk, but this is less pronounced in shop-bought soy yogurt and in soy yogurt made from commercial soy milk.

Soy yogurt is similar in protein content to dairy yogurt, lower in sugar, and higher in fat. If not fortified, soy yogurt does not contain vitamin B12 or vitamin D.

Plant-based milks have different structures and components than dairy milk. Though they can be used to make many products similar to those made from dairy, there are differences in taste and texture. For example, "soy, almond, [and] coconut yogurts do not have the same delicate and smooth structure that conventional yogurts have." Since plant-based milks do not contain lactose (the food of Streptococcus thermophilus and Lactobacillus bulgaricus), plant-based yogurts usually contain different bacterial strains than a dairy yogurt, such as Lactobacillus casei, Lactobacillus rhamnosus, and Bifidobacterium bifidum. Plant-based yogurts also vary considerably in their nutrition and ingredients, and may contain gums, stabilizers, high-intensity sweeteners, and artificial colors.

== Regulation of word "yogurt" ==
In the European Union, companies may not market their plant-based products using the word "yogurt" since that term is reserved for products of animal origin only — per European Union regulation 1308/2013 and a 2017 ruling in the Court of Justice of the European Union.

In the US, according to the FDA's Standard of Identity regulations, the word "yogurt" has been reserved for a product made from lactations. In 2018, the FDA issued a formal request for information on the subject. In 2021, the FDA issued a final rule that amends yogurt's standard of identity (which remains a product of "milk-derived ingredients"), and is expecting to issue industry guidance on "Labeling of Plant-based Milk Alternatives" in 2022.
