= Soy milk =

Beverage made from soybeans

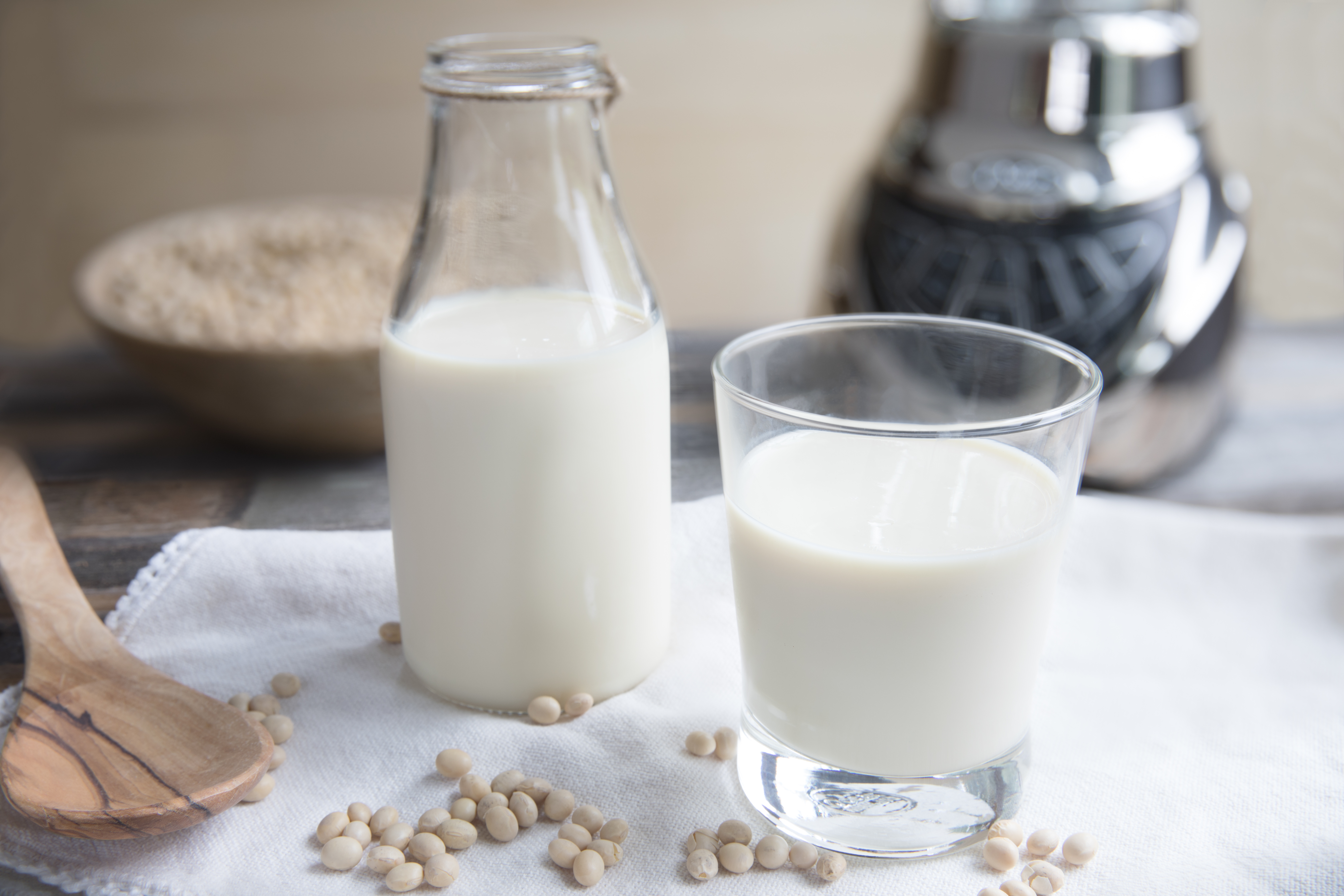
- Alternative names: Soya milk
- Place of origin: China
- Invented: a. 1365
- Food energy (per 100 g serving): 33 kcal (140 kJ)
Nutritional value
(per 100 g serving)
- Protein: 2.86 g
- Fat: 1.61 g
- Carbohydrate: 1.74 g
- Glycemic index: 34 (low)

Soy milk
- Chinese: 豆奶
Transcriptions
Standard Mandarin
- Hanyu Pinyin: dòunǎi
- Wade–Giles: tou nai

Literary Chinese name
- Chinese: 豆乳
- Literal meaning: bean milk
Transcriptions
Standard Mandarin
- Hanyu Pinyin: dòurǔ
- Wade–Giles: tou ju

Archaic Chinese name
- Chinese: 菽乳
- Literal meaning: bean milk
Transcriptions
Standard Mandarin
- Hanyu Pinyin: shúrǔ
- Wade–Giles: shu ju

Soy milk (or soymilk), also known as soya milk, is a plant-based milk produced by soaking and grinding soybeans, boiling the mixture, and filtering out remaining particulates. It is a stable emulsion of oil, water, and protein. Its original form is an intermediate product of the manufacture of tofu. Originating in China, it became a common beverage in Europe and North America in the latter half of the 20th century, especially as production techniques were developed to give it a taste and consistency more closely resembling that of dairy milk. Soy milk may be used as a substitute for dairy milk by individuals who are vegan or lactose-intolerant or have a milk allergy.

Soy milk is also used in making imitation dairy products such as soy yogurt, soy cream, soy kefir, and soy-based cheese analogues. It is also used as an ingredient for making milkshakes, pancakes, smoothies, bread, mayonnaise, and baked goods.

== Names ==
In some parts of China, the term 豆浆 dòujiāng (lit. "bean broth") is used for the traditional watery liquid, used locally as a drink or broth, produced as an intermediate product in the production of tofu, while store-bought products that are designed to imitate the flavor and consistency of dairy milk (and may contain a mixture of dairy and soy) are more often known as 豆奶 dòunǎi ("bean milk").

=== Naming in the EU ===
In the European Union, "milk" by law refers exclusively to "the normal mammary secretion obtained from one or more milkings without either addition thereto or extraction therefrom". Only cow's milk is allowed to be named "milk" on packaging, and any other milks must state the name of the respective animal: for example, "goat milk" or "sheep milk". There are exceptions for traditional products such as coconut milk. The usage of the term "soy milk" became the subject of a 2017 court case before the Court of Justice of the European Union after a German consumer protection group filed an unfair competition complaint about a company describing its soy and tofu products as 'milk' or 'cheese'. The Court of Justice ruled that such designations may not be used for purely plant-based products and that additions indicating the plant origin of the products (soy milk) does not influence that prohibition.

== History ==
The earliest record of soybean milk is on a stone slab of the Eastern Han dynasty unearthed in China, on which is engraved a description of the making of soy milk in ancient kitchens.

A tofu broth (doufujiang) c. 1365 was used during the Mongol Yuan. As doujiang, this drink remains a common watery form of soy milk in China, usually prepared from fresh soybeans. The compendium of Materia Medica, which was completed in 1578, also has an evaluation of soymilk. Its use increased during the Qing dynasty, apparently due to the discovery that gently heating doujiang for at least 90 minutes hydrolyzed or helped to break down its undesirable raffinose and stachyose, oligosaccharides which can cause flatulence and digestive pain among lactose-intolerant adults. By the 18th century, it was common enough that street vendors were hawking it; in the 19th, it was also common to take a cup to tofu shops to get hot, fresh doujiang for breakfast. It was already often paired with youtiao, which was dipped into it. The process was industrialized in early Republican China. By 1929, two Shanghai factories were selling over 1000 bottles a day, and another in Beijing was almost as productive itself. Following disruption from the Second World War and the Chinese Civil War, soy milk began to be marketed in soft drink-like fashion in Hong Kong, Singapore, and Japan in the 1950s.

Soymilk was mentioned in various European letters from China beginning in the 17th century. "Soy milk" entered the English language (as "soy-bean milk") in an 1897 USDA report. Li Yuying established Caséo-Sojaïne, the first soy milk "dairy", in Colombes, France, in 1910; he received the first British and American patents for soy milk manufacturing in 1912 and 1913. J.A. Chard began production of "Soy Lac" in New York City, United States, in 1917. Harry W. Miller—an American businessman forced to relocate his factory from Shanghai owing to World War II—was similarly compelled by the US Department of Agriculture and the US dairy industry to use the term "Soya Lac" rather than "soy milk". John Harvey Kellogg had been working with what he called "soymilk" at his Battle Creek Sanitarium since 1930, but was similarly compelled to market his acidophilus-enriched beverage as "Soygal" when it began commercial production in 1942.

A string of 40 court cases against Rich Products between 1949 and 1974 finally established that non-dairy "milks" and imitation dairy products were "a new and distinct food", rather than inferior and illegal knock-offs. Cornell researchers established the enzyme lipoxygenase as responsible for the "beany" flavor of soy milk made in 1966; the same research established a process for reducing or eliminating the bean flavor from commercial products. With Tetra Pak cartons extending soy milk's shelf life, Hong Kong-based Vitasoy reintroduced the product to the US market in 1980 and brought it to 20 other countries within a few years. Alpro similarly began production in Belgium in 1980, quickly becoming Europe's leading producer. New production technology and techniques led to soy beverages with an appreciably more milk-like flavor and consistency in the mid-1980s.

== Preparation ==
Soy milk is made from whole soybeans or full-fat soy flour. The dry beans are soaked in water for a minimum of three hours up to overnight depending on the temperature of the water. The rehydrated beans then undergo wet grinding with enough added water to give the desired solids content to the final product which has a protein content of 1–4%, depending on the method of production. The ratio of water to beans on a weight basis is 10:1 for traditional soy milk. The resulting slurry or purée is brought to a boil to improve its taste properties (see "Soy odor" below), to inactivate soybean trypsin inhibitor proteins, and to sterilize the product. Heating at or near the boiling point is continued for a period of time, 15–20 minutes, followed by the removal of insoluble residues (soy pulp fiber) by straining/filtration.

Processing requires the use of an anti-foaming agent or natural defoamer during the boiling step. Bringing filtered soy milk to a boil avoids the problem of foaming. It is generally opaque, white or off-white in color, and approximately the same consistency as cow's milk. Quality attributes during preparation include germination time for the beans used, acidity, total protein and carbohydrates, phytic acid content, and viscosity. Raw soy milk may be sweetened, flavored, and fortified with micronutrients. Once fully processed, soy milk products are typically sold in plastic bottles or plastic-coated cartons, such as tetrapaks.

=== Soy odor ===
Traditional East Asian soymilk has a "beany" odor, partly of hexanal, considered disagreeable by most Westerners. This is caused by the lipooxygenase (LOX) in the soy oxidizing the fat in the beans. Rehydrating the beans allows the reaction to proceed with the oxygen gas dissolved in soaking water. To eliminate the odor, one can either disable the LOX enzyme with heat or remove the oxygen dissolved in the water. The former can be achieved by soaking beans in hot water (a "hot grind"), skipping the soak entirely, or blanching the soy in water or steam first. The latter can be achieved by a variety of chemical means, such as adding glucose and glucose oxidase to consume the oxygen. The soybean cultivar also influences the odor and a mutant cultivar lacking LOX completely has been produced.

The issue and preference of soy odor also affects products made from soymilk, especially tofu. See Tofu § Flavor.

== Commerce ==
With soybean production increasing worldwide during the early 21st century, and consumer interest in plant milks growing from demand in Asia, Europe, and the United States, soy milk became the second-most consumed plant milk (after almond milk) by 2019. Soy milk sales declined in the United States during 2018–19, mainly due to the rising popularity of almond milk and loss of market share to the successful introduction of oat milk.

Based on the latest data from Grand View Research, the soy milk market reached USD 5.51 billion in 2024 and is estimated to reach USD 7.4 billion by 2030. The estimated CAGR is 5.1% from 2025 to 2030. Growth in consumption was due mainly to expanding the flavors of sweetened soy milks and uses in desserts, whereas unsweetened soy milk was being used particularly in Asia-Pacific countries as an ingredient in snacks and various prepared foods.

== Usage ==
=== Nutrition ===
A cup (243 mL) serving of a generic unsweetened commercial nutrient-fortified brand of soy milk provides 80 calories from 4 g of carbohydrates (including 1 g of sugar), 4 g of fat and 7 g of protein. This processed soy milk contains appreciable levels of vitamin A, B vitamins, and vitamin D in a range of 10 to 45% of the Daily Value, with calcium and magnesium also in significant content.

It has a glycemic index of 34±4. For protein quality, one study gave soya milk a Digestible Indispensable Amino Acid Score (DIAAS) of 78% for infants, 99% for young children, and 117% for older children, adolescents, and adults, with the limiting amino acid for those groups being leucine, lysine, and valine respectively. A DIAAS of 100% or more is considered to be an excellent/high protein quality source.

=== Nutritional content of human, cow, soy, almond, and oat milks ===
Non-human milks are fortified

Nutrient value per 250 mL cup	Human milk	Cow's milk (whole)	Soy milk (unsweetened)	Almond milk (unsweetened)	Oat milk (unsweetened)
Energy, kJ (kcal)	720 (172)	620 (149)	330 (80)	160 (39)	500 (120)
Protein (g)	2.5	7.69	6.95	1.55	3
Fat (g)	10.8	7.93	3.91	2.88	5
Saturated fat (g)	4.9	4.55	0.5	0.21	0.5
Carbohydrate (g)	17.0	11.71	4.23	1.52	16
Fiber (g)	0	0	1.2	0	2
Sugars (g)	17.0	12.32	1	0	7
Calcium (mg)	79	276	301 (Note: Commonly added to plant milks, which do not naturally contain significant levels of the nutrient.)	516	350
Potassium (mg)	125	322	292	176	389
Sodium (mg)	42	105	90	186	101
Vitamin B_{12} (mcg)	0.1	1.10	2.70	0	1.2
Vitamin A (IU)	522	395 (Note: Vitamin A fortification is only required for skimmed milk in the US.)	503	372	-
Vitamin D (IU)	9.8	124 (Note: Vitamin D fortification for milk is mandatory in the US.)	119	110	-
Cholesterol (mg)	34.4	24	0	0	0

=== Taste ===
Doujiang
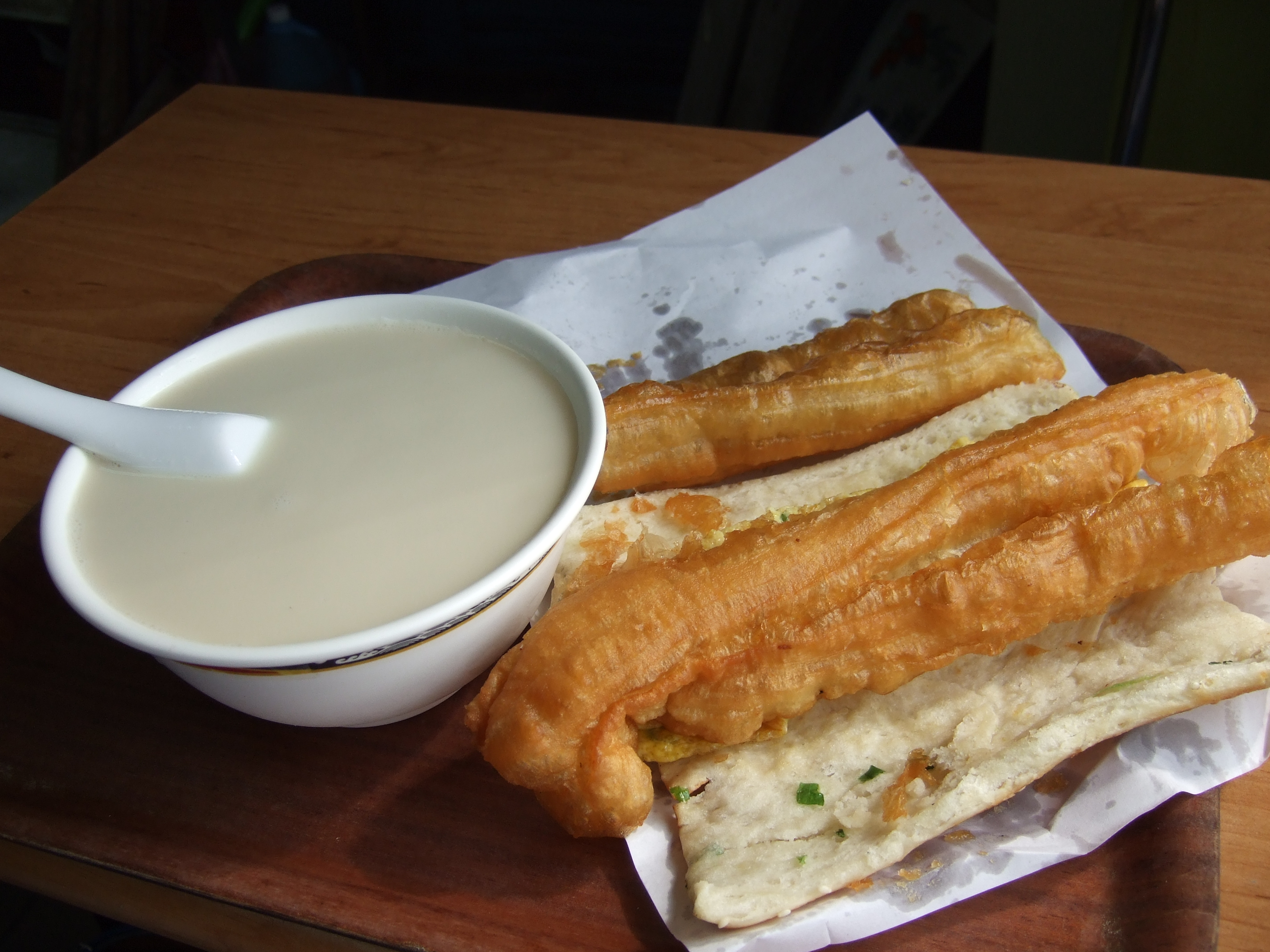
- A youtiao with a bowl of doujiang
- Traditional Chinese: 豆漿
- Simplified Chinese: 豆浆
- Literal meaning: soybean broth
Transcriptions
Standard Mandarin
- Hanyu Pinyin: dòujiāng
- Wade–Giles: tou chiang
- IPA: [tôʊ.tɕjáŋ]
Yue: Cantonese
- Yale Romanization: dauh-jēung
- Jyutping: dau^{6}-zoeng^{1}

Historic name
- Traditional Chinese: 豆腐漿
- Simplified Chinese: 豆腐浆
- Literal meaning: tofu broth
Transcriptions
Standard Mandarin
- Hanyu Pinyin: dòufujiāng
- Wade–Giles: tou-fu chiang

Manufactured, sweetened soy milk has an oatmeal-like, nutty flavor. In acidic hot drinks, such as coffee, curdling may occur, requiring some manufacturers to add acidity regulators.

==== Phytic acid ====
Soybeans, and soy milk in particular, contain phytic acid, which may act as a chelating agent and inhibit mineral absorption, especially for diets already low in minerals. However, dietary intake of phytic acid may help reduce the risk of developing colon cancer.

=== Regional ===
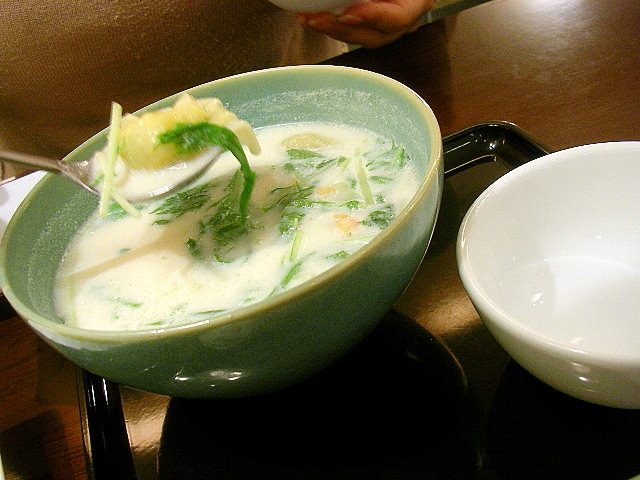
Soy milk soup with salt and vinegar, along with vegetables and wontons

Soy milk is a common beverage in East Asian cuisines.

- In Chinese cuisine, "sweet" soy milk is made by adding cane sugar or simple syrup. "Salty" or "savory" soy milk is often combined with chopped pickled mustard greens, dried shrimp, youtiao croutons, chopped spring onions, cilantro, pork floss, and/or shallots, along with vinegar, sesame oil, soy sauce, and/or chili oil. Both are traditional breakfast foods, served hot or cold depending on the season or personal preference. At breakfast, it is often accompanied by starchy carbohydrate-rich foods like mantou (a thick, fluffy kind of roll or bun), youtiao (deep-fried dough sticks), and shaobing (sesame flatbread).
- Japanese cuisine uses soy milk to make yuba and as an occasional base for nabemono.
- In Korean cuisine, soy milk is used as the broth for making kongguksu, a cold noodle soup eaten mostly in summer.
- In Taiwanese cuisine, soy milk is a popular breakfast item, often served with Chinese donuts (you tiao).

In many countries, soy milk is used in vegan and vegetarian food products and as a substitute replacement for cow's milk in many recipes. Soy milk is also used in making imitation dairy products such as soy yogurt, soy cream, soy kefir and soy-based cheese analogues. It is also used as an ingredient for making milkshakes, pancakes, smoothies, bread, mayonnaise, and baked goods.

== Ecological effects ==
Mean water footprint for one glass (200 g) of different milks
Milk types	Water use (L per 200 g)
Cow's milk	131
Almond milk	74
Rice milk	56
Oat milk	9
Soy milk	2

Mean greenhouse gas emissions for one glass (200g) of different milks
Milk Types	Greenhouse gas emissions (kg CO2-Ceq per 200g)
Cow's milk	0.62
Rice milk	0.23
Soy milk	0.21
Oat milk	0.19
Almond milk	0.16

Using soybeans to make milk instead of raising cows is ecologically advantageous. Cows require much more energy to produce milk, since the farmer must feed the animal, which can consume up to 24 kilograms (53 lb) of food in dry matter basis and 90 to 180 litres (24 to 48 US gal) of water a day, producing an average of 40 kilograms (88 lb) of milk a day. Legumes, including the soybean plant, also replenish the nitrogen content of the soil in which they are grown.

The cultivation of soybeans in South America is a cause of deforestation (specifically in the Amazon rainforest) and a range of other large-scale environmental harm. However, the majority of soybean cultivation worldwide, especially in South America where cattle farming is widespread, is intended for livestock fodder rather than soy milk production.

== See also ==
- List of soy-based foods
- Milk substitute
- Plant milk
- Soy boy
- Soy milk maker
- Soy yogurt
- Tofu (soy milk curd)
- Tofu skin

== Bibliography ==
- Atkinson, Fiona S.; Foster-Powell, Kaye; Brand-Miller, Jennie C. (December 2008). "International Tables of Glycemic Index and Glycemic Load Values: 2008". Diabetes Care. 31 (12): 2281–2283. doi:10.2337/dc08-1239. PMC 2584181. PMID 18835944.
- Huang, H.T. (2008). "Early Uses of Soybean in Chinese History". In Du Bois, Christine M.; Tan, Chee Beng; Mintz, Sidney Wilfred (eds.). The World of Soy. University of Illinois Press. ISBN 978-0-252-03341-4.
- Lawrence, S. E.; Lopetcharat, K.; Drake, M.A. (February 2016). "Preference Mapping of Soymilk with Different U.S. Consumers". Journal of Food Science. 81 (2): S463–76. doi:10.1111/1750-3841.13182. PMID 26677062.
- Langworthy, C.F. (7 July 1897). "Soy Beans as Food for Man". USDA Farmers' Bulletin (58): 20–23 – via UNT Digital Library.
- Ma, Lei; Li, Bin; Han, Fenxia; Yan, Shurong; Wang, Lianzheng; Sun, Junming (15 April 2015). "Evaluation of the chemical quality traits of soybean seeds, as related to sensory attributes of soymilk". Food Chemistry. 173: 694–701. doi:10.1016/j.foodchem.2014.10.096. PMID 25466078.
- Shi, Xiaodi; Li, Jingyan; Wang, Shuming; Zhang, Lei; Qiu, Lijuan; Han, Tianfu; Wang, Qianyu; Chang, Sam Kow-Ching; Guo, Shuntang (15 October 2015). "Flavor characteristic analysis of soymilk prepared by different soybean cultivars and establishment of evaluation method of soybean cultivars suitable for soymilk processing". Food Chemistry. 185: 422–429. doi:10.1016/j.foodchem.2015.04.011. PMID 25952888.
- Shurtleff, William; Aoyagi, Akiko (2004), Dr John Harvey Kellogg and Battle Creek Foods: Work with Soy], History of Soybeans and Soyfoods, 1100 BC to the 1980s, Lafayette: Soyinfo Center
- Shurtleff, William; Aoyagi, Akiko (2009), History of Miso, Soybean Jiang (China), Jang (Korea), and Tauco/Taotjo (Indonesia), 200 BC–2009 (PDF), Lafayette: Soyinfo Center, ISBN 9781928914228
- Shurtleff, William; Aoyagi, Akiko (2013), History of Soymilk and Other Non-Dairy Milks, 1226 to 2013 (PDF), Lafayette: Soyinfo Center
- Shurtleff, William; Aoyagi, Akiko (2014), History of Soybeans and Soyfoods in China and Taiwan and in Chinese Cookbooks, Restaurants, and Chinese Work with Soyfoods outside China, 1024 BCE to 2014 (PDF), Lafayette: Soyinfo Center
