= Doujiang =

Fresh soy milk in Chinese cuisine

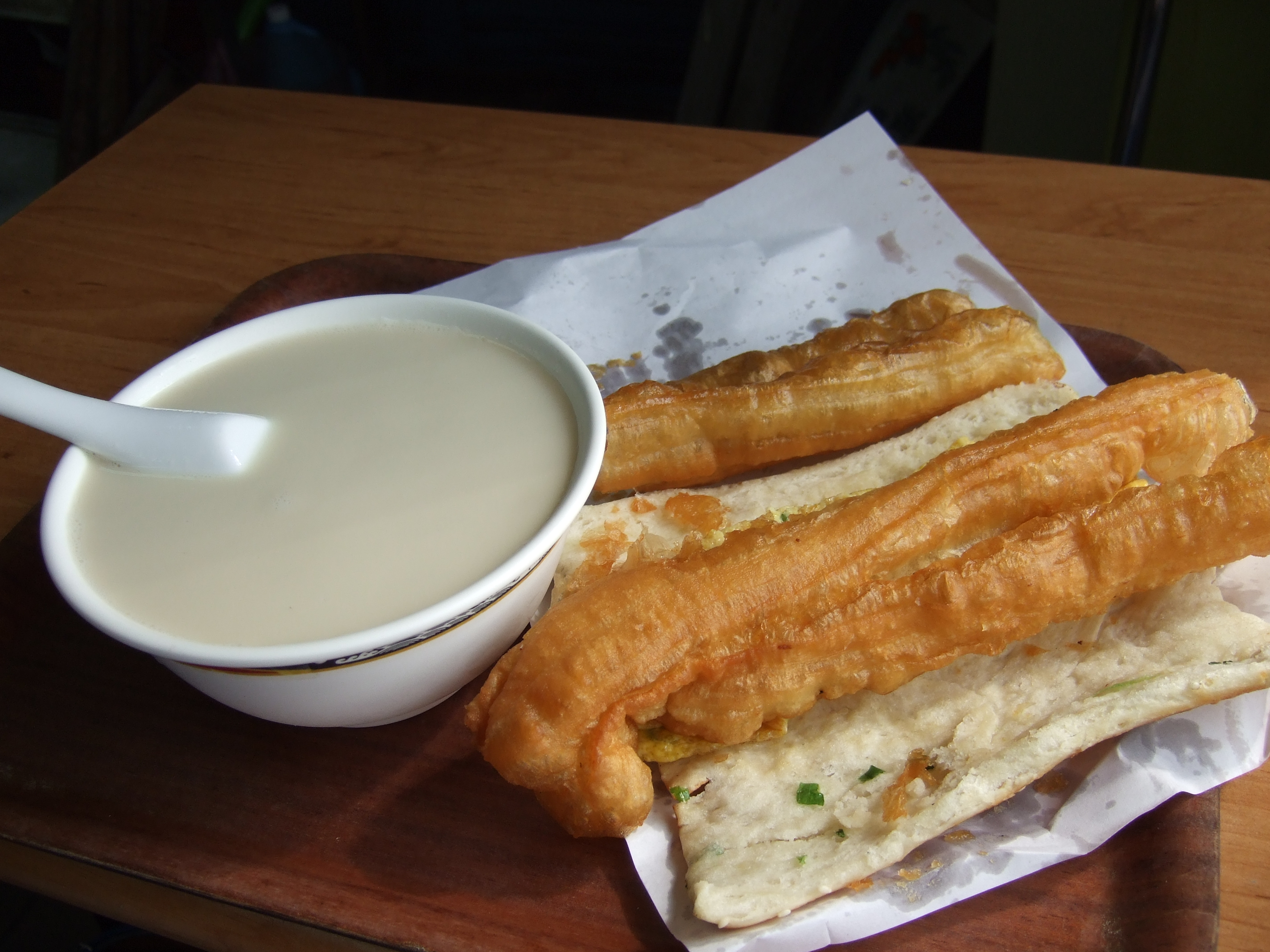
- Doujiang and youtiao
- Type: soy milk
- Place of origin: China
- Associated cuisine: Chinese cuisine Taiwanese cuisine
- Main ingredients: soybeans

Doujiang (traditional Chinese: 豆漿; simplified Chinese: 豆浆; pinyin: dòujiāng; Jyutping: dau6 zoeng1) is fresh soy milk in Chinese cuisine. It can be served hot or cool, sweet or savoury. Sometimes, it is lightly curdled with vinegar. It is a common breakfast item served with youtiao.

Chinese speakers differentiate doujiang from dounai (Chinese: 豆奶; pinyin: dòunǎi), which is the dairy-like soy milk that comes in packs and are used in items such as soy latte. Usually, doujiang is served in a bowl, and dounai is served in a cup.
