= Poi, Pakistan =

Coordinates: 30°21′0″N 68°5′0″E

- Town and union council
- Interactive map of Poi, Pakistan
- Country: Pakistan
- Region: Balochistan
- District: Ziarat District
- Time zone: UTC+5 (PST)

Poi is a town and union council of Ziarat District in the Balochistan province of Pakistan. It is located at 30°21'0N 68°4'60E and has an altitude of 2057 m (6751 ft).
