= Point of interface =

In telecommunications a point of interface (POI) is used to show the physical interface between two different carriers, such as a local exchange carrier (LEC) and a wireless carrier, or an LEC and an IntereXchange Carrier (IXC). This demarcation point often defines responsibility as well as serving as a point for testing. In many cases, a POI exists as a point of demarcation ("DEMARC") within an LEC building, and is established under "co-location" agreements. A long distance, wireless, or competitive local carrier "rents" space at the local telephone (usually tandem switch) location.

This space is physically a "cage" in which a device for interconnecting telecom services is installed. This device was originally a wire frame with one side being accessed by the LEC, and the other side accessed by the other carrier. In recent years, "electronic frames" such as digital cross connect systems have been used as POI devices. Local exchange services are ordered from the local telephone carrier who delivers the service to their side of the POI. The other carrier then arranges to its own facilities (fiber, or other type of transport) into the POI and transports the service to its own network facilities.

== See also ==
- Federal Standard 1037C
