= Peanut milk =

Plant milk made from peanuts

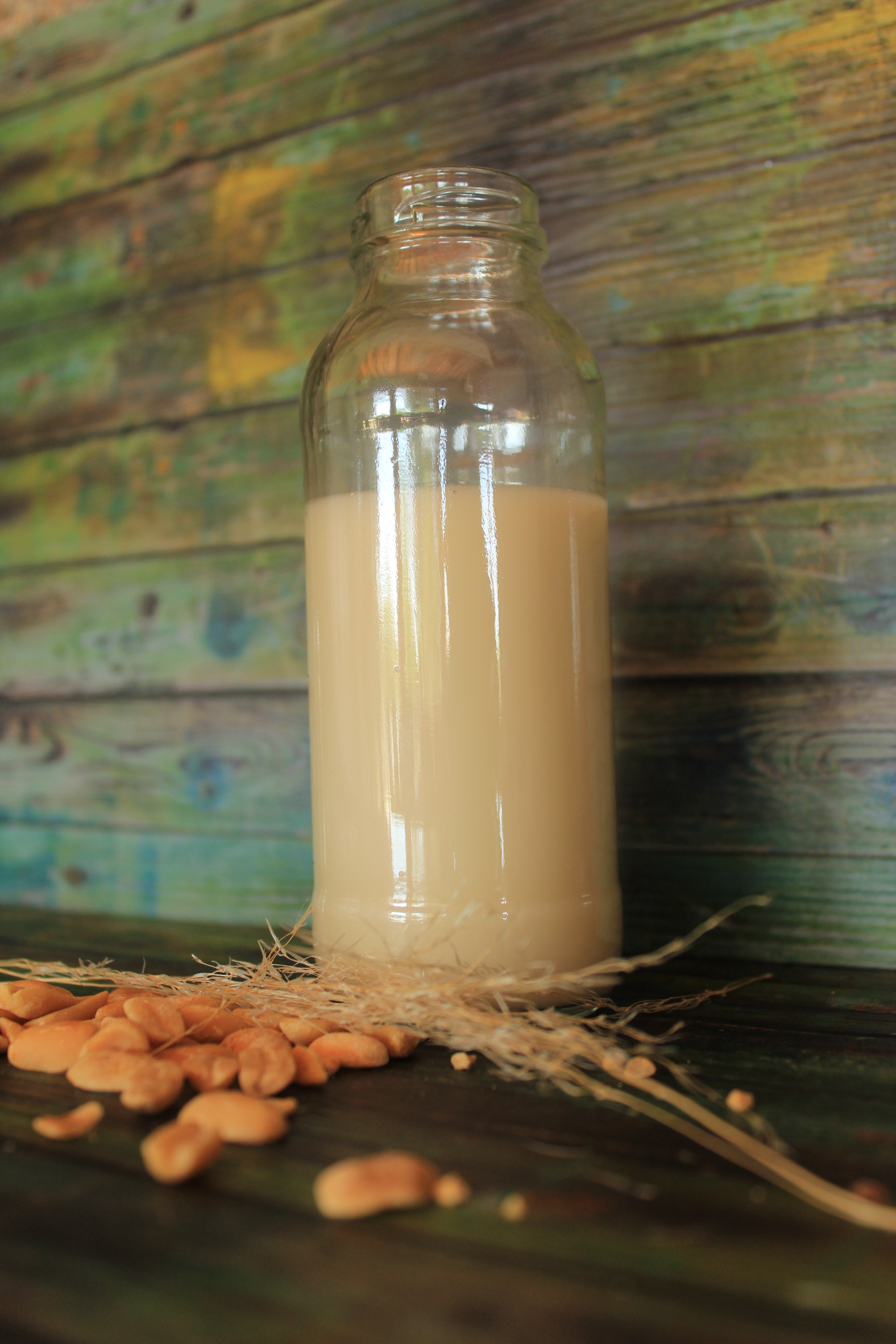
Peanut milk

Peanut milk is a plant milk, which is an alternative to animal milk. It is made with peanuts, water, and sometimes other additional ingredients like salt, sugar, or cinnamon. Peanut milk is high in fat and protein compared to other plant-based milks. This milk is sometimes used by people who are lactose-intolerant, vegan, or on a casein-free diet, as it has no lactose, but includes nutritional benefits like being high in magnesium, Vitamin E, Vitamin B-6, and protein.

In the northern region of Nigeria it is a popular drink known as groundnut milk.

== History ==
The earliest known production of peanut milk was by the Incas in the 17th century. Almeda Lambert published a recipe for it in 1899 and its use was promoted by George Washington Carver from 1919.

== Market availability ==
There are very few manufacturers of peanut milk, despite plant-based milks being mass-manufactured, such as cashew, almond, and rice milk. As dietary preferences shift, as evidenced by the fact that online searches for diets like veganism have doubled in the United States since 2015, tripled in Australia, France, and Spain, and more than quadrupled in Sweden, demand for non-dairy milk has increased. Plant-based milk purchases in U.S. grocery stores rose by 5% over the previous year, accounting for 14% of total milk sales, according to the Plant Based Foods Association's examination of store sales statistics. Sales of regular milk, on the other hand, had risen by 0.1 percent.

== Production ==
In order to make a basic form of peanut milk, the following is needed: peanuts, water, a blender and a Cheesecloth. The first step includes putting peanuts in a jar big enough to hold them, and then soaking the peanuts in water for at least six hours. Then transfer the soaked peanuts into a blender and blend them until smooth. Finally, transfer the blended nut substance into a cheesecloth to squeeze out the peanut milk, now ready for consumption.

In Nigeria, peeled or unpeeled groundnuts are blended and boiled for few minutes. Groundnut milk is served cold and chilled using refrigerator and ice cubes.

== Sustainability ==
=== Water footprint ===
Though little research has been done on the sustainability of peanut milk itself (due to lack of mass-production), there is information available on the sustainability of peanuts. Peanut production is mainly concentrated in drier climates like in the Mideast and Midwest parts of the U.S. Peanuts in comparison to other nuts are the most water-efficient nut, as it takes around 3.2 gallons of water to produce one ounce of peanuts. This is because of its compact plant structure and its ability to grow underground, as it takes less biomass to intake water. The peanut plant also keeps water intake to a minimum through its vine's growth structure, allowing for a microclimate conserving water.

The following is an illustrated graph, showing the water usage of the 4 most harvested nuts in America.

Water usage
	Gallons of water per oz	grown in
Almonds	28.7	USA
Pistachios	23.6	USA
Walnuts	26.7	USA
Peanuts	3.2	USA

=== Carbon footprint ===
Peanuts have the lowest carbon emissions among popular USA nuts, allowing for sustainable farming. Peanuts are also unique compared to other nuts, as they improve soil composition and benefit other crops around them.

Carbon Emissions of USA Grown Nuts
	(kg CO_{2}-C_{eqv} per 1 kg	grown in
Almonds	3.56	USA
Pistachios	0.76	USA
Pecans	1.61	USA
Walnuts	2.00	USA
Peanuts	0.57	USA

== Nutritional value ==
Researchers developed a vitamin and mineral fortified infant formula that used peanut milk as a source of protein, fat and food energy. When compared to other plant-based milks, peanut milk has one of the highest protein and fat contents, allowing for a creamier milk. The macro nutrients in a cup of peanut milk include the following:

Nutritional facts of peanut milk
Nut milk (1 cup)	Peanut milk
Calories	150 cal
Fat	11 g
Protein	6 g
Carbs	6 g

Controversially, lectins, which are found in soy, peanuts, and other beans, may limit glucose absorption in the intestine, hence affecting total calorie consumption.

== Uses ==
Peanut milk is generally used as a dairy substitute for items such as coffee creamer, peanut soup, yogurt, parfait, cheese, tofu, or by itself.

== See also ==
- Porridge
- Aflatoxin
- Nigerian cuisine
- Peanut
