= Plant milk =

Milk-like drink made from plant-based ingredients

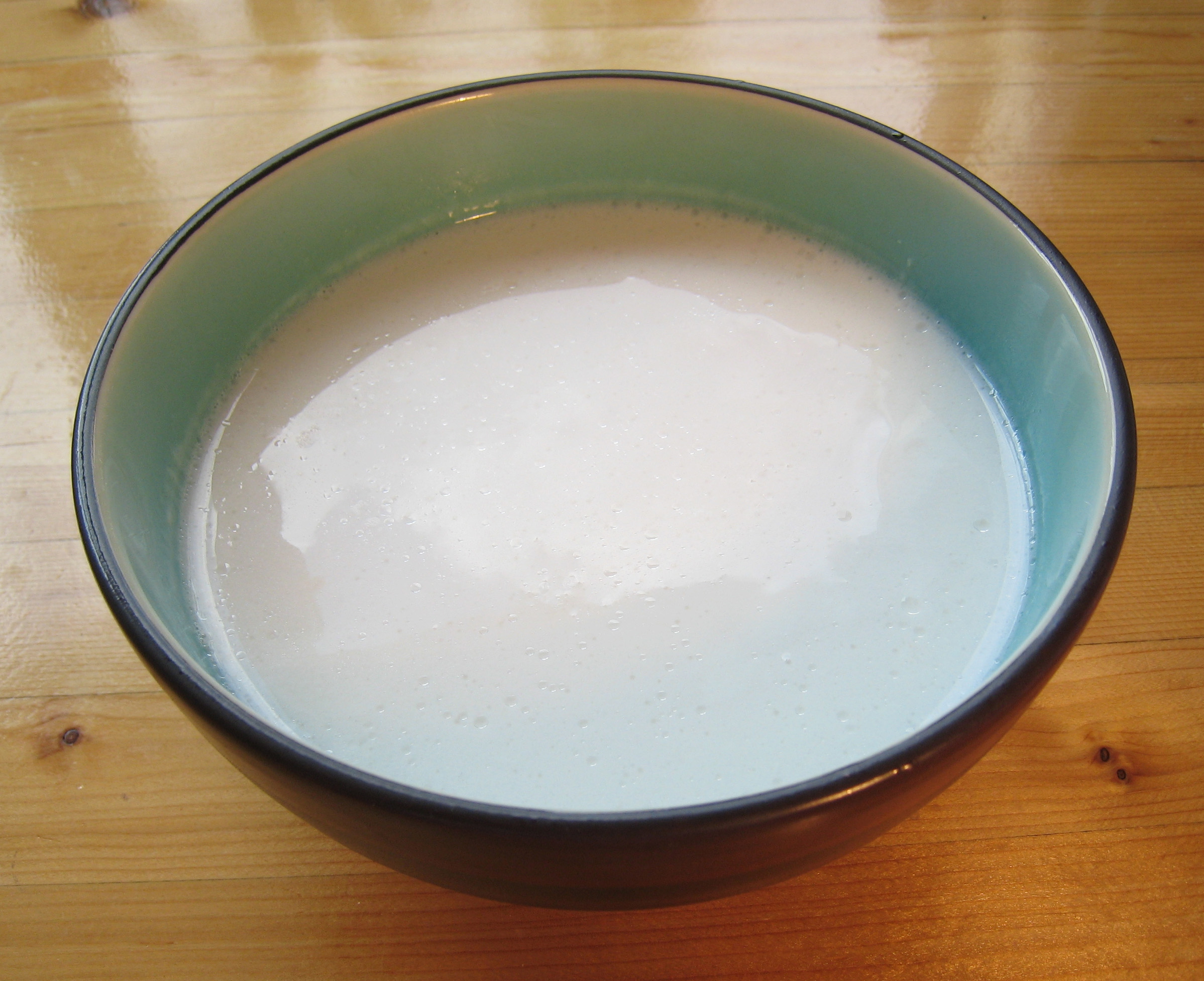
- Coconut milk
- Type: Non-dairy beverage and ingredient
- Color: White
- Flavor: Various; creamy texture
- Ingredients: Water and a grain, pseudocereal, legume, nut, seed, or coconut

Plant milk is a category of non-dairy beverages made from a water-based plant extract for flavoring and aroma. Nut milk is a subcategory made from nuts, while other plant milks may be created from grains, pseudocereals, legumes, seeds or endosperm. Plant-based milks are consumed as alternatives to dairy milk and provide similar qualities, such as a creamy mouthfeel, as well as a bland or palatable taste. Many are sweetened or flavored (e.g., vanilla).

As of 2026, there were about 20 different types of plant milks, of which almond, oat, soy, coconut and pea are the highest-selling worldwide. Production of plant milks—particularly soy, oat, and pea milks—can offer environmental advantages over animal milks in terms of greenhouse gas emissions and land and water use.

Plant-based beverages have been consumed for centuries, with the term "milk-like plant juices" used since the 13th century. In the 21st century, these drinks are commonly referred to as plant-based milk, alternative milk, non-dairy milk or vegan milk. For commerce, plant-based beverages are typically packaged in containers similar and competitive to those used for dairy milk, but cannot be labeled as "milk" within the European Union.

Across various cultures, plant milk has been both a beverage and a flavor ingredient in sweet and savory dishes (such as the use of coconut milk in curries). These drinks are compatible with vegetarian and vegan lifestyles. Plant milks are also used to make ice cream alternatives, plant cream, vegan cheese, and yogurt-analogues (such as soy yogurt). The global plant milk market was estimated to reach US$62 billion by 2030.

== History ==
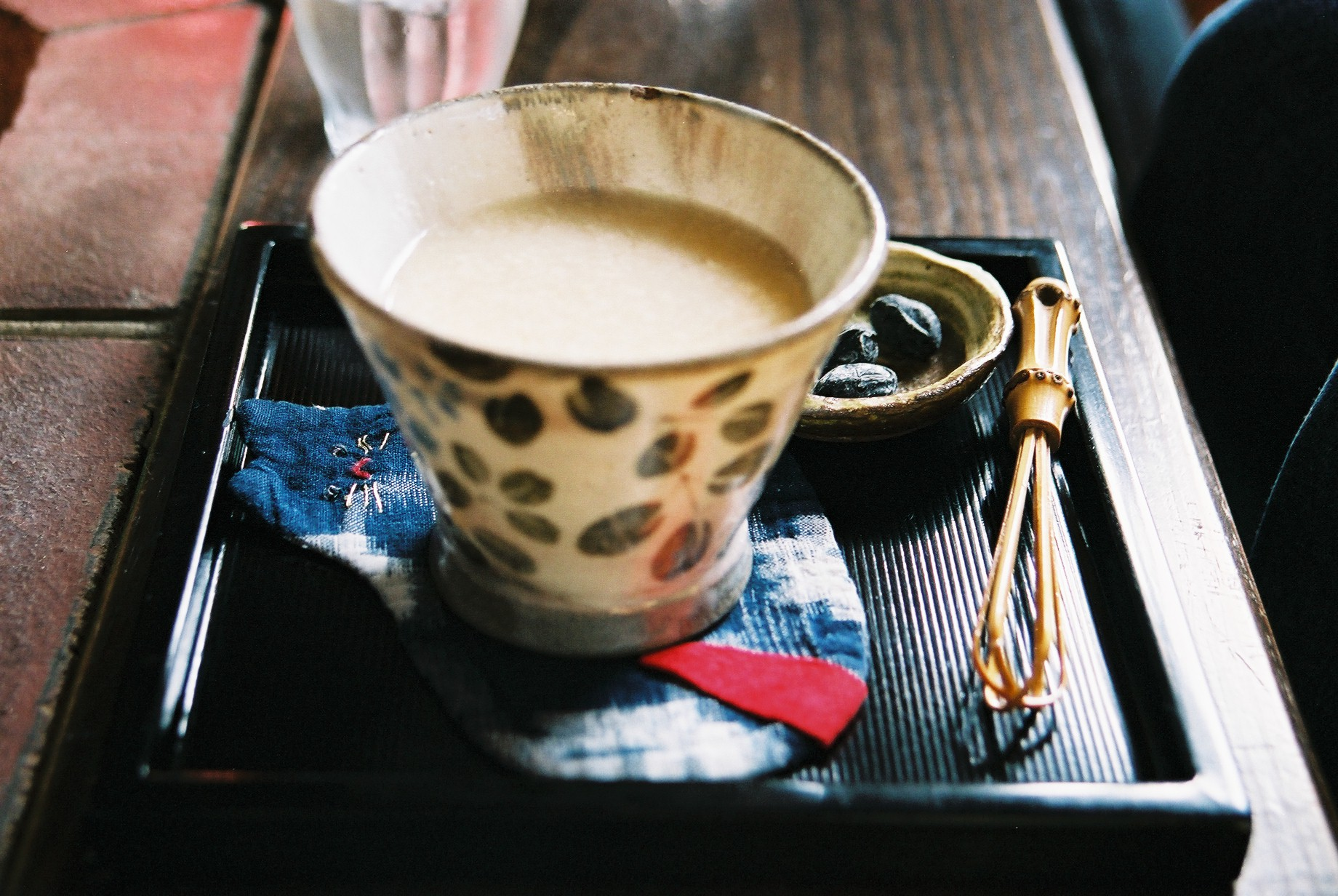
Amazake, Japanese rice milk

Before commercial production of 'milks' from legumes, beans and nuts, plant-based mixtures resembling milk have existed for centuries. The Wabanaki and other Native American tribal nations in the northeastern United States made milk and infant formula from nuts.

In English, the word "milk" has been used to refer to "milk-like plant juices" since 1200 CE.

Almond milk spread throughout Europe during the Middle Ages and was popular in parts of the Middle East. Recipes for almond milk in the Middle East date back to around the 13th century as it was mentioned in Muhammad bin Hasan al-Baghdadi’s cookbook Kitāb al-Ṭabīḫ (كتاب الطبيخ; The Book of Dishes), written in 1226. It was especially popular during Lent. Soy was a plant milk used in China during the 14th century. Soy milk use in China is first recorded in 1365. In medieval England, almond milk was used in dishes such as ris alkere (a type of rice pudding) and appears in the recipe collection The Forme of Cury. Coconut milk (and coconut cream) are traditional ingredients in many cuisines such as in South and Southeast Asia, East African coastal regions, and are often used in curries.

Plant milks may be regarded as milk substitutes in Western countries, but have traditionally been consumed in other parts of the world, especially ones where there are higher rates of lactose intolerance (see especially Lactose intolerance § Epidemiology).

== Types ==
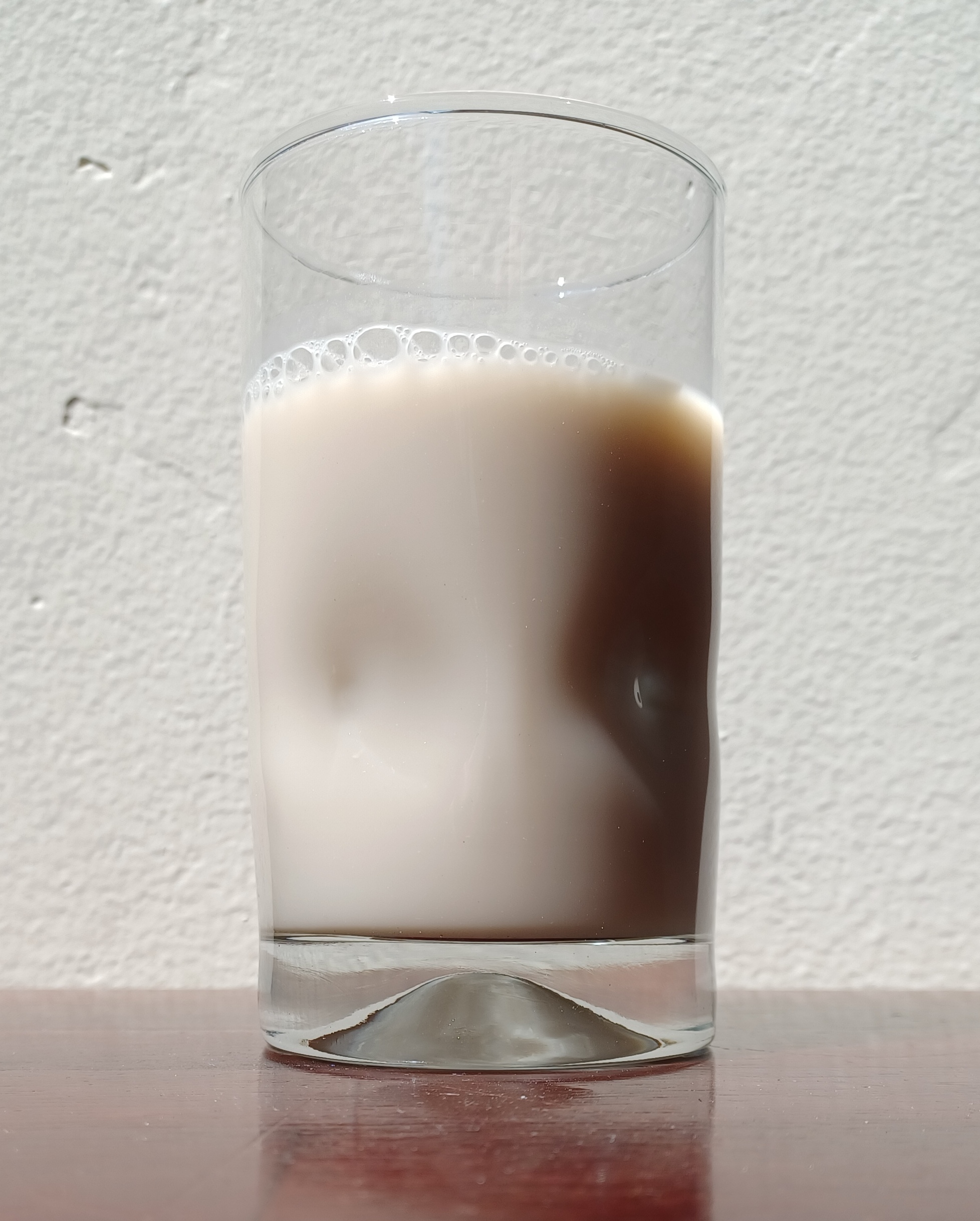
Barley milk

Common plant milks are almond milk, coconut milk, rice milk, oat milk and soy milk. Other plant milks include hemp milk, cashew milk, pea milk, and peanut milk.

Plant milks can be made from:

- Grains: barley, fonio, maize, millet, oat, rice, rye, sorghum, teff, triticale, spelt, wheat
- Pseudocereals: amaranth, buckwheat, quinoa
- Legumes: lupine, pea, peanut, soy, chickpea,
- Nuts: almond, brazil, cashew, hazelnut, macadamia, pecan, pistachio, walnut
- Seeds: chia seed, flax seed, hemp seed, pumpkin seed, sesame seed, sunflower seed
- Other: coconut (fruit; drupe), banana (fruit; berry), potato (tuber), tiger nut (tuber)

A blend is a plant milk created by mixing two or more types together. Examples of blends are almond-coconut milk and almond-cashew milk.

Other traditional plant milk recipes include:

- Kunu, a Nigerian beverage made from sprouted millet, sorghum, or maize
- Sikhye, a traditional sweet Korean rice beverage
- Amazake, a Japanese rice milk
- Thandal, a Sindhi beverage made from a mixture of seeds

== Manufacturing ==
Manufacturing methods vary according to the plant source and desired product. A typical process for soy milk, for example, may include the following steps:

- cleaning, soaking and dehulling the beans
- grinding of the starting material to produce a slurry, powder or emulsion
- heating the processed plant material to inactivate lipoxygenase enzymes that can contribute to undesirable flavors
- removing sedimentable solids by filtration
- adding water, sugar (or sugar substitutes) and other ingredients to improve flavour, aroma, and micronutrient content
- homogenizing the liquid to reduce particle size and improve stability and mouthfeel
- heat treatment, such as pasteurization or ultra-high-temperature (UHT) processing, followed by appropriate packaging and storage

Pasteurized plant milks generally require refrigerated storage, whereas UHT-treated products packaged aseptically can be stored unopened at room temperature for extended periods. Other ingredients may include stabilizers or emulsifiers such as guar gum, xanthan gum or lecithin, as well as salt, flavorings and added micronutrients such as calcium, B vitamins and vitamin D. Plant milks are also used to make ice cream, plant cream, vegan cheese, and yogurt-analogues, such as soy yogurt.

== Nutritional comparison with cow's milk ==
Many plant milks aim to contain the same proteins, vitamins and lipids as those produced by lactating mammals. Generally, because plant milks are manufactured using processed extracts of the starting plant, plant milks are lower in nutrient density than dairy milk and are fortified during manufacturing to add precise levels of micronutrients, commonly calcium, vitamin A and vitamin D. Animal milks are also commonly fortified, and many countries have laws mandating fortification of milk products with certain nutrients, commonly vitamins A and D.

=== Nutritional content of human, cow, soy, almond, and oat milks ===
Non-human milks are fortified

| Nutrient value per 250 mL cup | Human milk | Cow's milk (whole) | Soy milk (unsweetened) | Almond milk (unsweetened) | Oat milk (unsweetened) |
|---|---|---|---|---|---|
| Energy, kJ (kcal) | 720 (172) | 620 (149) | 330 (80) | 160 (39) | 500 (120) |
| Protein (g) | 2.5 | 7.69 | 6.95 | 1.55 | 3 |
| Fat (g) | 10.8 | 7.93 | 3.91 | 2.88 | 5 |
| Saturated fat (g) | 4.9 | 4.55 | 0.5 | 0.21 | 0.5 |
| Carbohydrate (g) | 17.0 | 11.71 | 4.23 | 1.52 | 16 |
| Fiber (g) | 0 | 0 | 1.2 | 0 | 2 |
| Sugars (g) | 17.0 | 12.32 | 1 | 0 | 7 |
| Calcium (mg) | 79 | 276 | 301 (Note: Commonly added to plant milks, which do not naturally contain significant levels of the nutrient.) | 516 | 350 |
| Potassium (mg) | 125 | 322 | 292 | 176 | 389 |
| Sodium (mg) | 42 | 105 | 90 | 186 | 101 |
| Vitamin B_{12} (mcg) | 0.1 | 1.10 | 2.70 | 0 | 1.2 |
| Vitamin A (IU) | 522 | 395 (Note: Vitamin A fortification is only required for skimmed milk in the US.) | 503 | 372 | - |
| Vitamin D (IU) | 9.8 | 124 (Note: Vitamin D fortification for milk is mandatory in the US.) | 119 | 110 | - |
| Cholesterol (mg) | 34.4 | 24 | 0 | 0 | 0 |

== Packaging and commerce ==
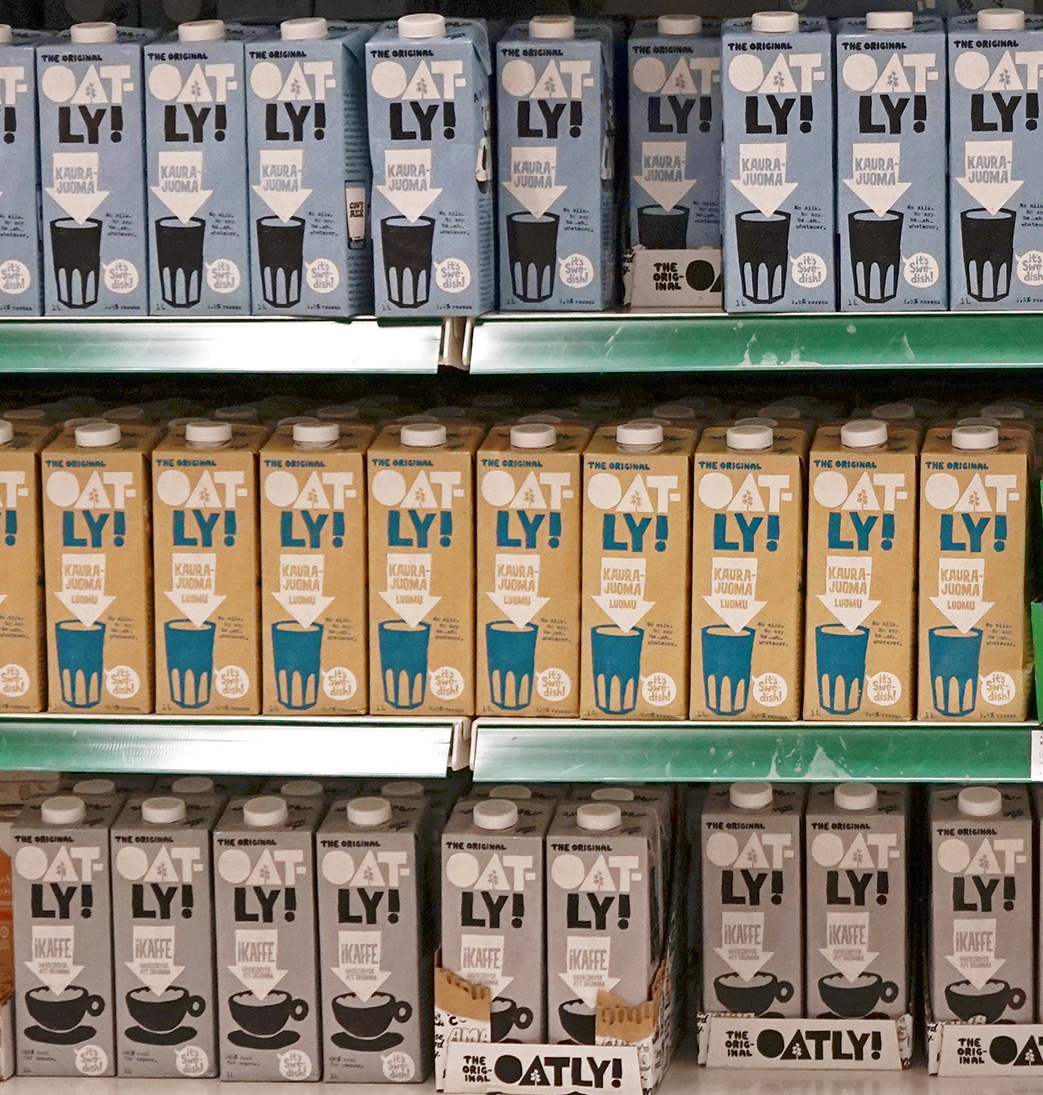
Shelves of Swedish oat drinks in original, organic, and specifically for coffee

Plant-based milks have emerged as an alternative to dairy in response to consumer dietary requests and changing attitudes about animals and the environment. Huffington Post stated that due to health and environmental reasons as well as changing consumer trends, more individuals regularly buy non-dairy alternatives to milk. Between 1974 and 2020, dairy milk consumption of people aged between 16 and 24 in the United Kingdom decreased from 94% to 73%. In Australia, there is decreased confidence within the dairy industry, with only 53% being optimistic in the future profitability and demand for dairy products per a Dairy Australia report.

To improve competition, plant milks are typically packaged in containers similar to those of dairy milks. A scientific journal article argued that plant-milk companies send the message that plant milks are 'good and wholesome' and dairy milk is 'bad for the environment', and the article also reported that an increasing number of young people associate dairy with environmental damage. There has been an increased concern that dairy production has adverse effects on biodiversity, water and land use. These negative links between dairy and the environment have also been communicated through audiovisual material against dairy production, such as 'Cowspiracy' and 'What the Health'. Animal welfare concerns have also contributed to the declining popularity of dairy milk in many Western countries. Advertising for plant milks may also contrast the intensive farming effort to produce dairy milk with the relative ease of harvesting plant sources, such as oats, rice or soybeans. In 2021, an advertisement for oat milk brand Oatly aired during the Super Bowl.

In 2020, one major coffee retailer – Starbucks – added oat milk, coconut milk, and almond milk beverages to its menus in the United States and Canada. By 2023, refrigerated oat milk sales in the United States had reached approximately $551 million for the 52 weeks ending May 21. Planet Oat was the leading individual brand in the segment, accounting for 35.2% of refrigerated oat milk dollar sales during that period.

A key dietary reason for the increased consumption of plant-based milks is lactose intolerance, such as in Australia where intolerance affects 4.5% of the population. In the United States, around 40 million people are lactose intolerant.

=== Standards ===
As of 2026, international standards for manufacturing and labeling of plant milks do not exist. Regionally, such as in the United States, plant-based, non-dairy beverages are required to comply with local, state, and federal requirements for manufacturing, packaging, labeling, distribution, and marketing. Such beverages must also prove a shelf-life of six months from their manufacturing date, may have refrigeration requirements, must have a shelf life of at least three months from the manufacturing date, and must have an allergen statement on the label if made with a plant source potentially containing an allergen.

Plant milk products in the United States may undergo random analytical testing by federal inspectors to meet microbiological standards.

== Environmental impacts ==
Mean greenhouse gas emissions for one glass (200 g) of different milks
| Milk Types | Greenhouse Gas Emissions (kg CO2-Ceq per 200 g) |
|---|---|
| Cow's milk | 0.62 |
| Rice milk | 0.23 |
| Soy milk | 0.21 |
| Oat milk | 0.19 |
| Almond milk | 0.16 |

Mean water footprint for one glass (200 g) of different milks
| Milk Types | Water use (L per 200 g) |
|---|---|
| Cow's milk | 131 |
| Almond milk | 74 |
| Rice milk | 56 |
| Oat milk | 9 |
| Soy milk | 2 |

Mean land use for one glass (200 g) of different milks
| Milk Types | Land Use (m^{2} per 200 g) |
|---|---|
| Cow's milk | 1.81 |
| Oat milk | 0.25 |
| Soy milk | 0.23 |
| Almond milk | 0.19 |
| Rice milk | 0.14 |

The environmental impacts of dairy and plant-based milks can be measured by metrics, including land use, greenhouse gas emissions, freshwater use, and eutrophication. Across all metrics, cow's milk has significantly higher impacts. On average, its production uses around 10 times as much land and 2 to 20 times as much freshwater as the production of plant-based milks. Additionally, dairy production creates around 3 times as much greenhouse gas emissions and 2 to 10 times as much eutrophication.

Among plant-based milks, the environmental impacts vary. For instance, while almond milk produces among the fewest greenhouse gas emissions, it also uses more freshwater than other plant-based alternatives.

The environmental impacts of plant milks vary according to factors including crop water requirements, farming practices, region of production, processing and transportation. Almond-based milk substitutes have been criticized for their water requirements and the use of pesticides in some production systems. Life-cycle assessments generally find that plant-based milks have lower greenhouse gas emissions and land use than dairy milk, although water use varies considerably between plant sources and production systems.

== Labeling and terminology ==
Historically, a number of plant-based beverages have been traditionally referred to as "milk". One of the first reliable modern English dictionaries, Samuel Johnson's 1755 A Dictionary of the English Language, gave two definitions of the word "milk". The first described "the liquor with which animals feed their young from the breast", and the second an "emulsion made by contusion of seeds", using almond milk as an example.

In the late 20th and early 21st centuries, the use of the term "milk" for plant-based drinks became controversial. As demand for plant-based milks increased, dairy manufacturers and distributors advocated for legally restricting the term to animal products only: arguing that consumers may confuse the two, or be misled as to the nutritional content of plant-based alternatives.

Many jurisdictions strictly regulate the use of the term "milk" on food labelling. Some countries have outright banned its use for non-dairy products, while others mandate that "milk" only be used with qualifiers (such as "oat milk") on non-dairy alternatives. Where use of the term "milk" is restricted, plant milks may be labeled with terms reflecting their composition (such as "oat drink"), or absence of ingredients (such as "dairy-free").

=== Australia and New Zealand ===
Food standards in Australia and New Zealand are developed by the same common body, called Food Standards Australia New Zealand. As of 2024, products sold as 'milk' without qualifiers in Australia or New Zealand "must be milk" which is defined as an animal product. Qualifiers such as "soy milk" are allowed, due to the use of quotation marks in the legislative instrument.

=== Canada ===
The Canadian Food Inspection Agency limits the use of the word "milk" solely to ″the normal lacteal secretion, free from colostrum, obtained from the mammary gland of an animal″.

=== Europe ===
In December 2013, European Union regulations stated that the terms "milk", "butter", "cheese", "cream" and "yoghurt" can be used to market and advertise products derived only from animal milk, with a small number of exceptions, including coconut milk, peanut butter and ice cream. In 2017, the Landgericht Trier (Trier regional court), Germany, asked the Court of Justice of the European Union, to clarify European food-labeling law (Case C-422/16), with the court stating that plant-based products cannot be marketed as milk, cream, butter, cheese or yoghurt within the European Union because these are reserved for animal products; exceptions to this do not include tofu and soy. Although plant-based dairy alternatives are not allowed to be called "milk", "cheese" and the like, they are allowed to be described as buttery or creamy. However, there are exceptions for each of the EU languages, based on established use of livestock terms for non-livestock products. The list's extent varies widely; for example there is only one exception in Polish, and 20 exceptions in English.

A proposal for further restrictions failed at second reading in the European Parliament, in May 2021. The proposal, called Amendment 171, would have outlawed labels including 'yogurt-style' and 'cheese alternative'.

In the United Kingdom, strict standards are applied via acts of parliament to food labeling for terms such as milk, cheese, cream, yogurt, which are protected to describe dairy products and may not be used to describe non-dairy produce. These rules date from the United Kingdom's membership of the European Union, and are still in force in Great Britain. To contrast, as of September 2023, the EU Regulation (EU) No 1169/2011 applies directly to Northern Ireland.

=== India ===
The FSSAI stipulates products need a declaration with the phrase "non-dairy product" if the product is a 'plant based beverage', and these must not be labelled with any dairy term. The use of the word 'milk' is limited to animal products. The regulator makes exceptions for cases where, internationally, as in the case of coconut milk and peanut butter, dairy terms were already in-use traditionally.

=== United States ===
In the United States, the dairy industry petitioned the FDA to ban the use of terms like "milk", "cheese", "cream" and "butter" on plant-based analogues (except for peanut butter). FDA commissioner Scott Gottlieb stated on 17 July 2018, that the term "milk" is used imprecisely in the labeling of non-dairy beverages, such as soy milk, oat milk and almond milk: "An almond doesn't lactate", he said. In 2019, the US National Milk Producers Federation petitioned the FDA to restrict labeling of plant-based milks, claiming they should be described as "imitation". In response, the Plant-Based Foods Association stated the word "imitation" was disparaging, and there was no evidence that consumers were misled or confused about plant-based milks. In developing its 2023 draft guidance, the FDA reported that available consumer research indicated that consumers generally understand that plant-based milk alternatives do not contain dairy milk, although some consumers may expect products labeled with the term “milk” to have a similar nutritional composition.

In February 2023, the FDA issued draft guidance on the labeling of plant-based milk alternatives. The agency stated that common or usual names such as “soy milk” and “almond milk” may be established through common usage and recommended voluntary nutrient statements for products labeled with the term “milk” when their nutrient composition differs from dairy milk.

Proponents of plant-based milk assert that these labeling requirements are infantilizing to consumers and burdensome and unfair on dairy-alternatives. Critics of the FDA's labeling requirements also asserted that there is often collusion between government officials and the dairy industry in an attempt to maintain dairy dominance in the market. For example, in 2017, Sen. Tammy Baldwin of Wisconsin introduced the "Defending Against Imitations and Replacements of Yogurt, Milk, and Cheese to Promote Regular Intake of Dairy Everyday (DAIRY PRIDE) Act" which would prevent almond milk, coconut milk and cashew milk from being labeled with terms like "milk", "yogurt", and "cheese". Proponents of plant-based dairy alternatives argued that dairy sales are decreasing faster than plant sales are increasing and that therefore, attacking plant milks as being the chief reason for a decline in dairy consumption is inaccurate. A 2020 USDA study found that the "increase in sales over 2013 to 2017 of plant-based options is one-fifth the size of the decrease in Americans' purchases of cow's milk."

== Health recommendations ==
Health authorities recommend that plant milks should not be given to infants younger than 12 months unless commercially prepared infant formula is available, such as soy infant formula. A 2020 clinical review stated that only appropriate commercial infant formulas should be used as alternatives to human milk which contains a substantial source of calcium, vitamin D and protein in the first year of life and that plant milks "do not represent an equivalent source of such nutrients".

The Healthy Drinks, Healthy Kids 2023 guidelines state that infants younger than 12 months should not drink plant milks. They suggest that children between 12 and 24 months may consume fortified soy milk, but not other non-dairy milks such as almond, oat and rice, which are deficient in key nutrients. A 2022 review suggested that the best option for toddlers (1–3 years old) who do not consume cow's milk would be to have at least 250 mL/day of fortified soy milk.

For vegan infants younger than 12 months who are not breastfed, the New Zealand Ministry of Health recommends soy infant formula and advises against the use of plant milks. A 2019 Consensus Statement from the Academy of Nutrition and Dietetics, American Academy of Pediatric Dentistry, American Academy of Pediatrics, and the American Heart Association concluded that plant milks are not recommended for infants younger than 12 months and that for children aged 1–5 years plant milks may be useful for those with allergies or intolerances to cow's milk but should only be consumed after a consultation with a professional health care provider.

=== Potential for allergenicity ===
Although manufacturing processes may denature allergenic proteins of the various seeds, grains, or legumes used to make plant milks, there remains potential for allergic reactions in susceptible people consuming these products.

== See also ==
- Lactose intolerance
- List of dishes made using coconut milk
- Milk substitute
- Non-dairy creamer
- Plant cream
- Roasted grain drink
- Soy milk maker
- Soy yogurt
- Vegan cheese
