= Rice milk =

Plant milk made from rice

Rice milk, unsweetened
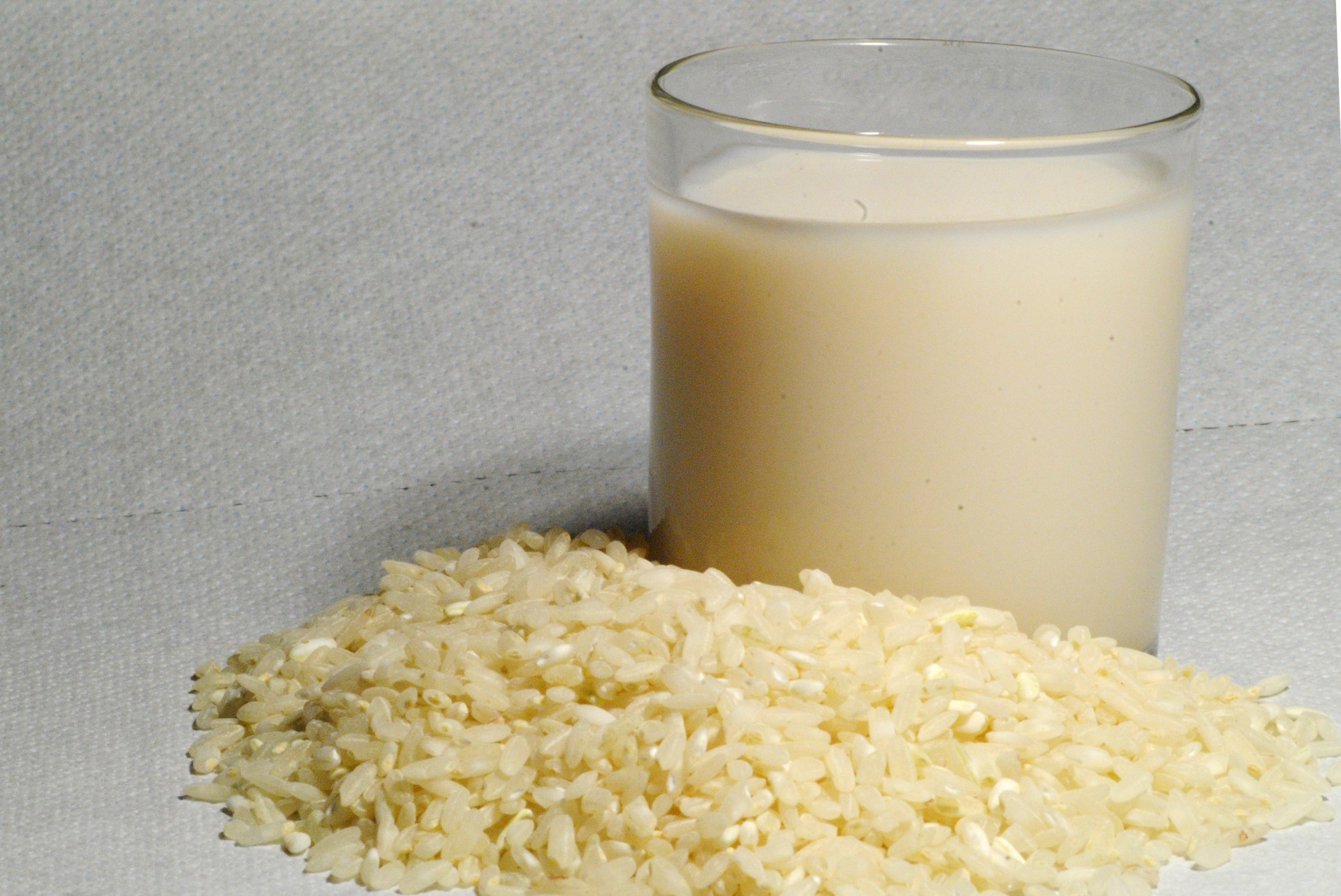
- A glass of rice milk next to some rice

Nutritional value per 100 g (3.5 oz)
- Energy: 195 kJ (47 kcal)
- Carbohydrates: 9.2 g
- Sugars: 5.3 g
- Dietary fiber: 0.3 g
- Fat: 1.0 g
- Protein: 0.3 g
Vitamins and minerals
| Vitamins | Quantity %DV^{†} |
| Thiamine (B1) | 3% 0.03 mg |
| Riboflavin (B2) | 1% 0.014 mg |
| Niacin (B3) | 3% 0.4 mg |
| Pantothenic acid (B5) | 3% 0.15 mg |
| Vitamin B6 | 2% 0.04 mg |
| Folate (B9) | 1% 2 μg |
| Vitamin B12 | 26% 0.63 μg |
| Vitamin C | 0% 0 mg |
| Vitamin D | 5% 1 μg |
| Vitamin E | 3% 0.47 mg |
| Vitamin K | 0% 0.2 μg |
| Minerals | Quantity %DV^{†} |
| Calcium | 9% 118 mg |
| Copper | 4% 0.04 mg |
| Iron | 1% 0.2 mg |
| Magnesium | 3% 11 mg |
| Manganese | 12% 0.28 mg |
| Phosphorus | 4% 56 mg |
| Potassium | 1% 27 mg |
| Sodium | 2% 39 mg |
| Zinc | 1% 0.13 mg |
- Other constituents: Quantity
- Water: 89.3 g
- Link to USDA Database entry
- ^{†}Percentages estimated using US recommendations for adults, except for potassium, which is estimated based on expert recommendation from the National Academies.

Rice milk is a plant milk made from rice. Commercial rice milk is typically manufactured using brown rice and brown rice syrup, and may be sweetened using sugar or sugar substitutes, and flavored by common ingredients, such as vanilla. It is commonly fortified with protein and micronutrients, such as vitamin B12, calcium, iron, or vitamin D.

== History ==
The exact origin of rice milk is uncertain. In 1914, Maria McIlvaine Gillmore gave a recipe for rice milk in her book Meatless Cookery, which was the earliest known use of the term. In 1921, the first rice milk factory was built by the Vita Rice Products Co., launching Vita Rice Milk the same year in San Francisco, California. In 1990, Rice Dream was launched by Imagine Foods of Palo Alto, California in Tetra Pak cartons, becoming the first widely popular rice milk.

== Nutrition ==
Rice milk (unsweetened) is 89% water, 9% carbohydrates, 1% fat, and contains negligible protein (table). A 100 ml reference amount provides 47 calories, and – if purposely fortified during manufacturing – 26% of the Daily Value (DV) for vitamin B12 (table). It also supplies calcium (12% DV; fortified) and manganese (13% DV; fortified) in moderate amounts, but otherwise is low in micronutrients.

== Safety in young children ==
Because of arsenic levels in rice, the United Kingdom's Food Standards Agency recommends that rice milk should not be given to children under 5 as a replacement for breast milk, formula milk or cow's milk.

== Comparison to dairy milk ==
Rice milk contains more carbohydrates when compared to cow's milk (9% vs. 5%), but does not contain significant amounts of calcium or protein, and no cholesterol or lactose. Commercial brands of rice milk are often fortified with vitamins and minerals, including calcium, vitamin B_{12}, vitamin B_{3}, and iron. It has a glycemic index of 86 compared to 37 for skim milk and 39 for whole milk.

Rice milk may be consumed by people who are lactose intolerant, allergic to soy or milk. It is also used as a dairy substitute by vegans.

== Commercial brands ==
Commercial brands of rice milk are available in various flavors, such as vanilla, as well as unflavored, and can be used in many recipes as an alternative to traditional cow milk.

== Preparation ==
Rice milk is made commercially by pressing the rice through a grinding mill, followed by filtration and blending in water. It may be made at home using rice flour and brown rice protein, or by boiling brown rice with a large volume of water, blending and filtering the mixture.

== Environmental concerns ==
Rice paddies require substantial water resources, and may enable fertilizers and pesticides to migrate into contiguous waterways. Bacteria inhabiting rice paddies release methane into the atmosphere, emitting this greenhouse gas in quantities greater than other plant milks.

Rice milk production uses less water than dairy milk and almond milk, but considerably more than soy milk or oat milk.

== Gallery ==
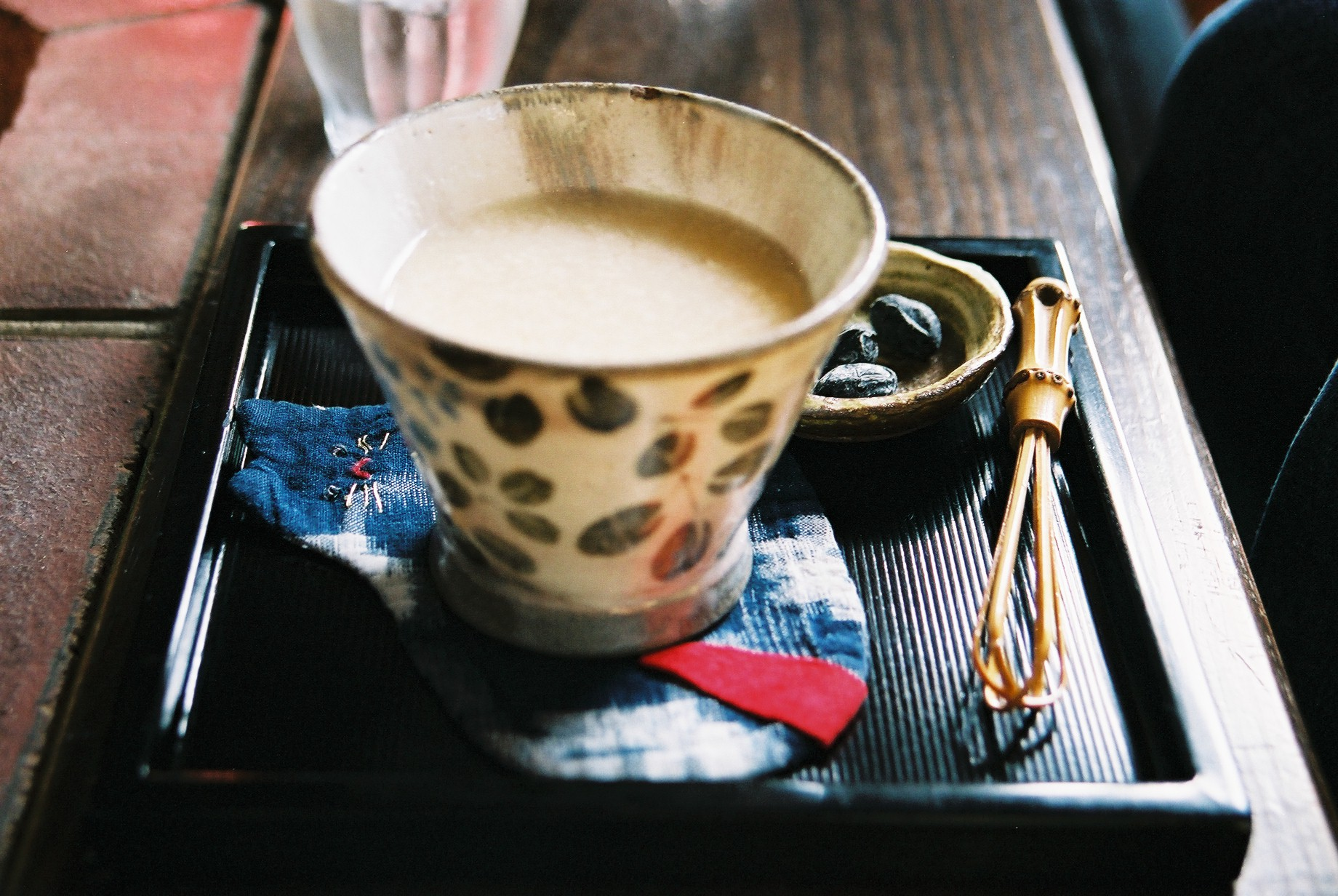
A cup of amazake

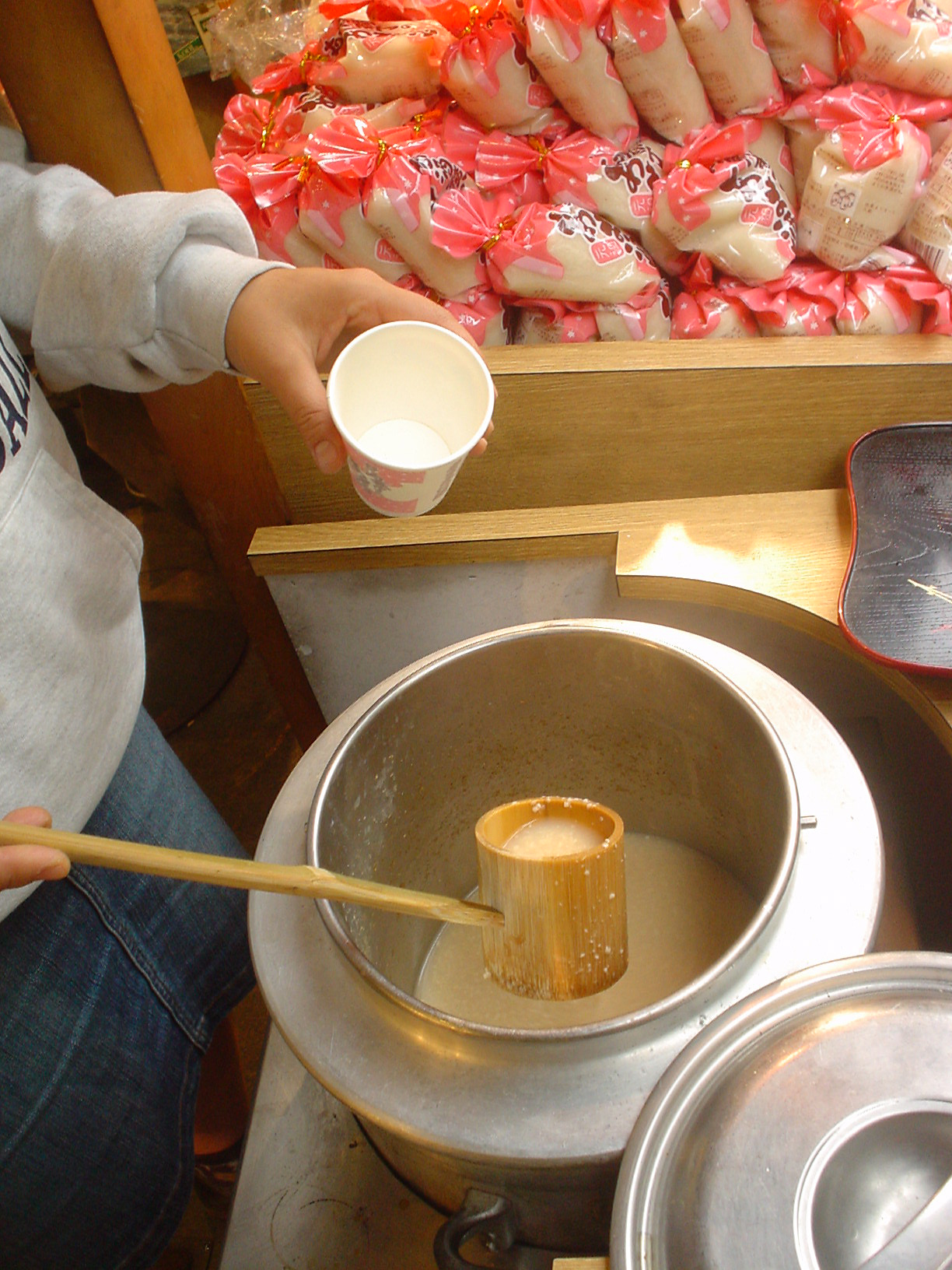
Japanese amazake – fermented rice milk – served from a ladle

== See also ==
- List of rice beverages
- Mishti doi
