= Almond milk =

Plant milk manufactured from almonds

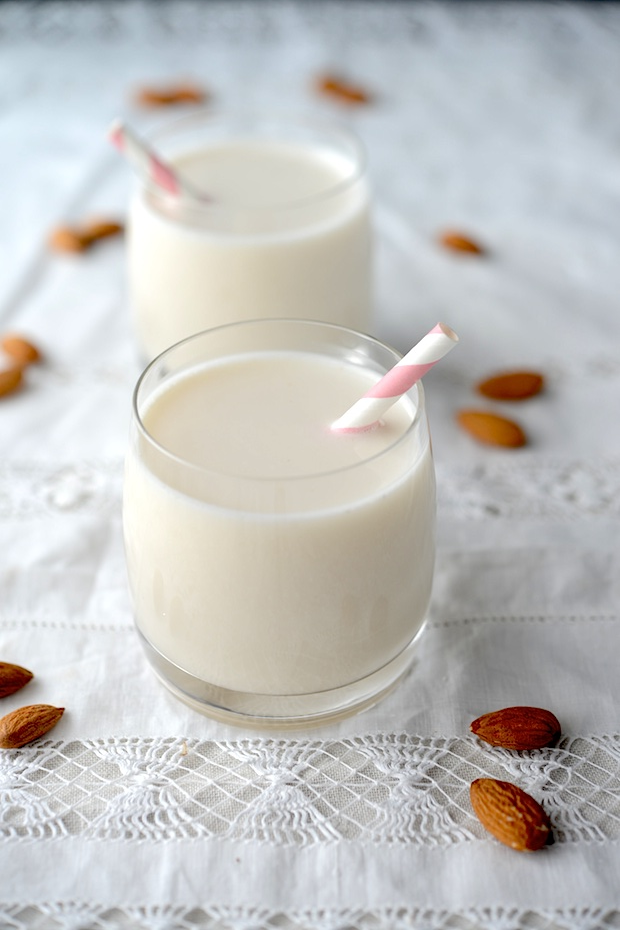
- Food energy (per 100 g (ml) serving): 15 kcal (63 kJ)
Nutritional value
(per 100 g (ml) serving)
- Protein: 0.40 g
- Fat: 0.96 g
- Carbohydrate: 1.31 g

Almond milk is a plant-based milk substitute with a watery texture and nutty flavor manufactured from almonds, although some types or brands are flavored in imitation of cow's milk. It does not contain cholesterol or lactose and is low in saturated fat. Almond milk is often consumed by those who are lactose-intolerant and others, such as vegans, who do not consume dairy products.

Commercial almond milk comes in sweetened, unsweetened, vanilla and chocolate flavors, and is usually fortified with micronutrients as a processed food.

Almond milk can also be made at home using a blender, almonds and water.

Global almond milk sales in 2018 were US$5.8 billion, growing at 14% per year, and forecast to be a $13 billion global market by 2025.

== History ==
The earliest recipes for almond milk date back to at least the 13th century Middle East, as it was listed in Muhammad bin Hasan al-Baghdadi’s book Kitāb al-Ṭabīḫ (كتاب الطبيخ; The Book of Dishes), written in 1226. Almond milk was used as a substitute for animal milk in the Middle Ages in areas that followed Catholic fasting laws. Some recipes for almond milk have used wine in the process. Historian Carolyn Walker Bynum notes that:

... Medieval cookbooks suggest that the aristocracy observed fasting strictly, if legalistically. Meat-day and fish-day recipes were not separated in medieval recipe collections, as they were in later, better-organized cookbooks. But the most basic dishes were given in fast-day as well as ordinary-day versions. For example, a thin split-pea puree, sometimes enriched with fish stock or almond milk (produced by simmering ground almonds in water), replaced meat broth on fast days; and almond milk was a general (and expensive) substitute for cow's milk.

Almond milk's popularity as a dairy substitute continued throughout history, going well into modern times. It is even mentioned under the secondary definition of "milk" in Samuel Johnson's Dictionary in 1755, alongside pistachio milk.

== Commerce ==
In the United States, almond milk remained a niche health food item until the early 2000s, when its popularity began to increase. In 2011 alone, almond milk sales increased by 79%. In 2013, it surpassed soy milk as the most popular plant-based milk in the US. As of 2014 it comprised 60 percent of plant-milk sales and 4.1 percent of total milk sales in the US.

Manufacturers and distributors of animal milk have advocated that plant-based milk not be labelled as "milk". They complain that consumers may be confused between the two, and that plant-based milks are not necessarily as nutritious in terms of vitamins and minerals. In the case of the United States, the FDA said in 2023 that plant-based milk could be labeled as milk, but that producers should note the nutritional differences from regular milk. European Union regulations require "milk" to be used for animals only, except coconut milk. (See Plant milk § Labeling and terminology.)

Within the Italian regions of Sicily, Apulia, Calabria, and Campania, almond milk is a protected traditional agricultural product.

== Nutrition ==
=== Nutritional content of human, cow, soy, almond, and oat milks ===
Non-human milks are fortified

Nutrient value per 250 mL cup	Human milk	Cow's milk (whole)	Soy milk (unsweetened)	Almond milk (unsweetened)	Oat milk (unsweetened)
Energy, kJ (kcal)	720 (172)	620 (149)	330 (80)	160 (39)	500 (120)
Protein (g)	2.5	7.69	6.95	1.55	3
Fat (g)	10.8	7.93	3.91	2.88	5
Saturated fat (g)	4.9	4.55	0.5	0.21	0.5
Carbohydrate (g)	17.0	11.71	4.23	1.52	16
Fiber (g)	0	0	1.2	0	2
Sugars (g)	17.0	12.32	1	0	7
Calcium (mg)	79	276	301 (Note: Commonly added to plant milks, which do not naturally contain significant levels of the nutrient.)	516	350
Potassium (mg)	125	322	292	176	389
Sodium (mg)	42	105	90	186	101
Vitamin B_{12} (mcg)	0.1	1.10	2.70	0	1.2
Vitamin A (IU)	522	395 (Note: Vitamin A fortification is only required for skimmed milk in the US.)	503	372	-
Vitamin D (IU)	9.8	124 (Note: Vitamin D fortification for milk is mandatory in the US.)	119	110	-
Cholesterol (mg)	34.4	24	0	0	0

If unfortified, almond milk has less vitamin D than fortified cow milk; in North America, cow milk must be fortified with vitamin D, but vitamins are added to plant milks on a voluntary basis. Vitamin E is released from the almonds and absorbed. The positive effects of the vitamin E include strengthening the cells. Because of its low protein content (0.4 g per 100 ml), almond milk is not a suitable replacement for breast milk, cow milk, or hydrolyzed formulas for children under two years of age.

== Production ==
The general production method involves soaking and grinding almonds in an excess of water. A milky white liquid is obtained after filtering the almond pulp (flesh). Almond milk can also be made by adding water to almond butter. In commercial production, almond milk is homogenised with high pressure and pasteurised for greater stability and shelf life.

Almond milk can be stored in the fridge in an air-tight container (preferably a glass container) for about 4–5 days. However, certain factors, such as the temperature of the refrigerator, sterilization of the blender or storing jar, and surface cleanliness, can decide how many days you can keep it fresh. Storing homemade almond milk for more than a week may reduce its nutrition or even make it unhealthy.

In July 2015, a class action lawsuit was filed in New York City against two American manufacturers, Blue Diamond Growers and White Wave Foods, for false advertising regarding the small quantity of almonds (only 2%) contained in the final product. In October 2015, a judge denied the plaintiff's request for an injunction.

== Sustainability ==
Mean greenhouse gas emissions for one glass (200 g) of different milks
Milk Types	Greenhouse Gas Emissions (kg CO_{2}-C_{eq} per 200 g)
Cow's Milk	0.62
Rice Milk	0.23
Soy Milk	0.21
Oat Milk	0.19
Almond Milk	0.16

Mean land use for one glass (200 g) of different milks
Milk Types	Land Use (m^{2} per 200 g)
Cow's Milk	1.81
Oat Milk	0.25
Soy Milk	0.23
Almond Milk	0.19
Rice Milk	0.14

Mean water footprint for one glass (200 g) of different milks
Milk Types	Water Use (L/200 g)
Cow's Milk	131
Almond Milk	74
Rice Milk	56
Oat Milk	9
Soy Milk	2

Almond production in California is concentrated mainly in the Central Valley, where the mild climate, rich soil, and abundant sunshine and water supply make for ideal growing conditions. Due to the persistent droughts in California in the early 21st century, it became more difficult to raise almonds in a sustainable manner.

Almond sustainability is challenged because of the high amount of water needed to grow almonds: a single glass of almond milk requires roughly 74 litres (16 imp gal; 20 US gal) of water to produce. Among plant-based milks, almond milk requires substantially more water during the growing and production stages than soy, rice or oat milk (graph). Dairy milk requires more water to produce than almond milk (graph). In 2014, California produced 42.3 billion pounds of cow's milk and only 2.14 billion pounds of almond milk.

Sustainability strategies implemented by the Almond Board of California and almond farmers include:

- tree and soil health, and other farming practices
- minimizing dust production during the harvest
- bee health
- irrigation guidelines for farmers
- food safety
- use of waste biomass as coproducts with a goal to achieve zero waste
- use of solar energy during processing
- job development
- support of scientific research to investigate the potential health benefits of consuming almonds
- international education about sustainability practices

== See also ==
- Coconut milk
- Oat milk
- Orgeat syrup
- Plant milk
- Soy milk
