= Plant cream =

Vegan imitation of dairy cream

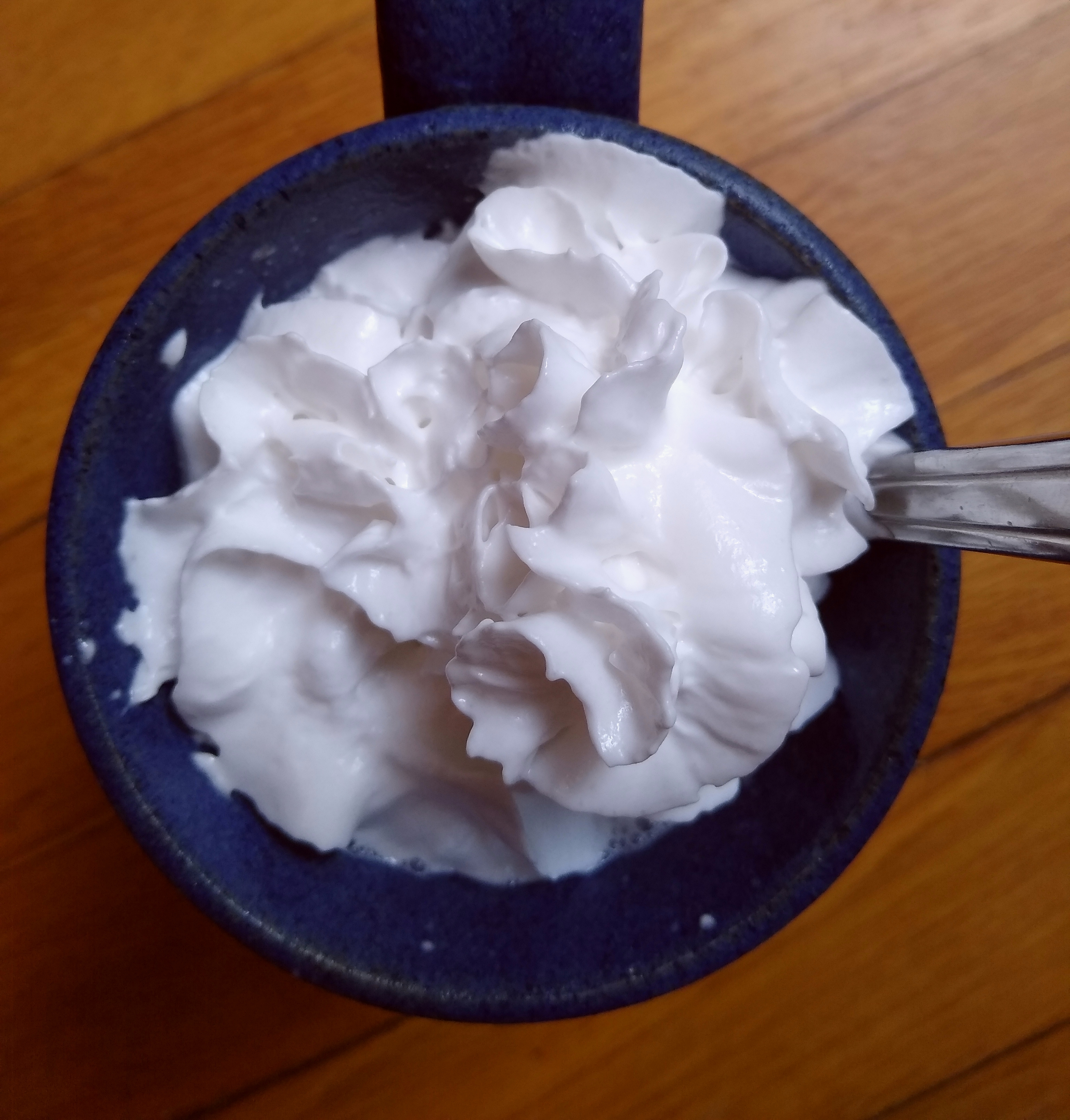
Coconut-based vegan whipped cream

Plant cream is a dairy-free version of dairy cream, and thus vegan. It is typically produced by grinding plant material into a thick liquid to which gums are added to imitate the viscosity and mouthfeel of cream. Common varieties are soy cream, coconut cream, and cashew cream. It is used as a dessert topping and in many other dishes and beverages.

Some dairy cream substitutes contain a mixture of non-dairy and dairy ingredients. For instance, Cool Whip includes some milk; Elmlea sells both fully plant-based and mixed creams.

As of 1998, plant cream was similar in price to double cream but more expensive than single cream.

Whipped toppings are 'fat foams'; usually made from partially hydrogenated vegetable oil. Upon whipping, some fat is released from the fat globules. This fat 'glues' a network of fat globules. Air is entrapped in this network thus creating the foam. They differ from whipped cream dessert toppings due to containing very little to no dairy whatsoever.

== Nutrition ==
A 1998 study comparing vegan cream with dairy cream found that calories and fat content were similar, but that the vegan cream was lower in saturated fat and higher in polyunsaturated fat. The vegan cream contained low vitamin A, no vitamin D, and lower calcium than dairy single cream.

== See also ==
- Plant milk
- Cream
- Aquafaba
- Whipped cream#Imitation whipped cream
