= Eva Batt =

English vegan cookbook writer

- Born: Eva Valentine Dominey; 1908; Hackney
- Died: 26 February 1989 (aged 81); Ilford
- Occupation: Cookbook writer
- Spouse: Alan Eric Batt (m. 1933)

Eva Valentine Batt (1908 – 26 February 1989) was an English cookbook writer and activist for veganism. She was chairman of The Vegan Society for many years and has been described as an influential vegan cookery pioneer.

== Career ==
Batt was a vegetarian but became a vegan in 1954 after witnessing the separation of a cow and calf for dairy production. She stated that "I hadn't previously realised how much cows were exploited throughout their lives by being made to produce more milk than nature intended". She served on The Vegan Society Committee from 1958 to 1961 and from 1966 until her retirement in 1982. She was elected a vice-president in 1966 and was chairman from 1967 to 1982. She served on the editorial board of The Vegan magazine from 1966 to 1974. Batt was a speaker at the International Vegetarian Congress on behalf of The Vegan Society in 1971. In 1976, Batt appeared in the Open Door TV series in the episode "The Vegan Society: To a Brighter Future".

Batt was a vegan for ethical reasons and opposed the use of any animal products including eggs, milk, fur, leather, pearls and cosmetics. Her 1964 essay Why Veganism? was published in H. Jay Dinshah's Here's Harmlessness: An Anthology of Ahimsa for the American Vegan Society. In the essay she defined veganism as "a way of living which avoids exploitation, whether it be of our fellow men, the animal population, or the soil upon which we rely for our very existence". She was a council member of the American Vegan Society.

Batt has been described as an influential vegan cookery pioneer. She authored two vegan cookbooks, What's Cooking? in 1973 and What Else is Cooking? in 1983. The former was republished as Eva Batt's Vegan Cookery by Thorsons in 1985 and had sold more than 20,000 copies by 1989. It was expanded and revised in conjunction with The Vegan Society. The first part of the book was written for vegetarians who are considering to make the change to veganism.

She was an activist for Beauty Without Cruelty and was a director of Plamil Foods. Batt resided in Bournemouth in the 1980s and was described as "Bournemouth's grandma of veganism". In 1985 at aged 77, Batt suggested that living a vegan lifestyle is healthier and commented, "I think I've proved it".

== Family ==
She was married to Alan Eric Batt. He was the owner of Enfield Tyre Company in 1968.

== Selected publications ==
- In Lighter Vein. The Vegan Society. 1974.
- Eva Batt's Vegan Cookery. Thorsons. 1985. ISBN 0-7225-1161-2.
- Vegan Cooking: Recipes for Beginners. Thorsons. 2002. ISBN 978-0007129973.

== Quotes ==
Putting veganism into practice will require a little patience, some knowledge of nutrition (which is easily learned and is a most rewarding study) and perhaps a bit of help from other vegans who have acquired local knowledge about the availability in the area of pure foods, humane clothing and household products.

— Eva Batt, in 1964

Anyone living near a farm or slaughterhouse has learned the pitiful cries of both mother and calf.

— Eva Batt, in 1975
