= Barbara Moore (vegetarian activist) =

British walker and engineer (1903–1977)

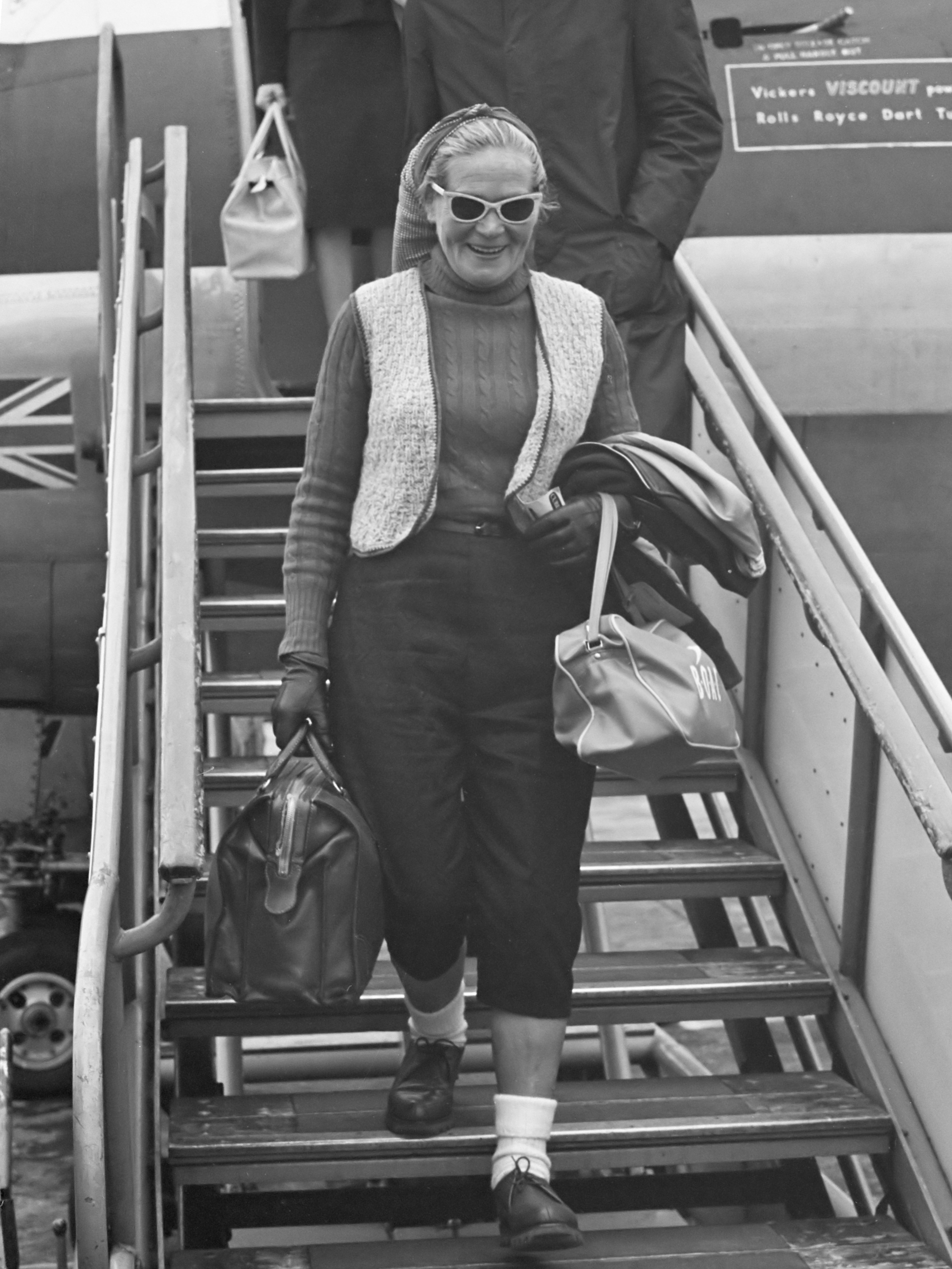
Barbara Moore (1961)

Barbara Moore, born Anna Cherkasova (Russian: Анна Черкасова; 22 December 1903 – 14 May 1977), was a Russian-born British engineer who attempted to gain celebrity status in the early 1960s for her long-distance walking and promotion of questionable health fads.

== Biography ==
Moore was among the first generation of Soviet female engineers after the Russian Revolution. In 1932, she became the Soviet Union's long-distance motorcycle champion. She immigrated to Great Britain in 1939, marrying an art teacher, Harry Moore. They later separated. She also used the name Barbara Moore-Pataleewa.

In December 1959, she walked from Edinburgh to London. In early 1960, she walked from John o'Groats to Land's End in 23 days. She then undertook an 86-day, 3,387-mile walk from San Francisco to New York City, where she arrived on 6 July 1960.

She was a vegetarian and a breatharian, believing it is possible for people to survive without food. She walked with only nuts, honey, raw fruit and vegetable juice for nourishment. In November 1944 the then-new Vegan Society held its first meeting, at the Attic Club, 144 High Holborn, London. Those in attendance were Donald Watson, Elsie B. Shrigley, Fay K. Henderson, Alfred Hy Haffenden, Paul Spencer and Bernard Drake, with Moore observing.

Moore held that people could live to be 200 years old by abstaining from smoking, drinking alcohol and sex. She claimed she had cured herself of leukemia by way of a special diet.

To test her health theories, she planned to build a laboratory next door to her home in Frimley. She was soon drawn into a lengthy legal battle over a sewer and access roads for a nearby housing estate. She spent years and her life savings fighting her case, but ultimately lost in the High Court of Justice. She was jailed for contempt of court after she refused to accept the ruling.

She died in a London hospital on 14 May 1977, bankrupt and near starvation because of her refusal to eat.

Her John o'Groats-to-Land's End walk caught the attention of Harry Griffin, who advocated a revival of the Bob Graham Round as possibly a much sterner test of fitness.

Moore was portrayed by Zena Walker in a dramatisation of her later life in a 1980 episode of Play for Today entitled "That crazy woman" after one of the newspaper headlines generated by her walks.
