= Louise Wallis =

English musician and writer (born 1964)

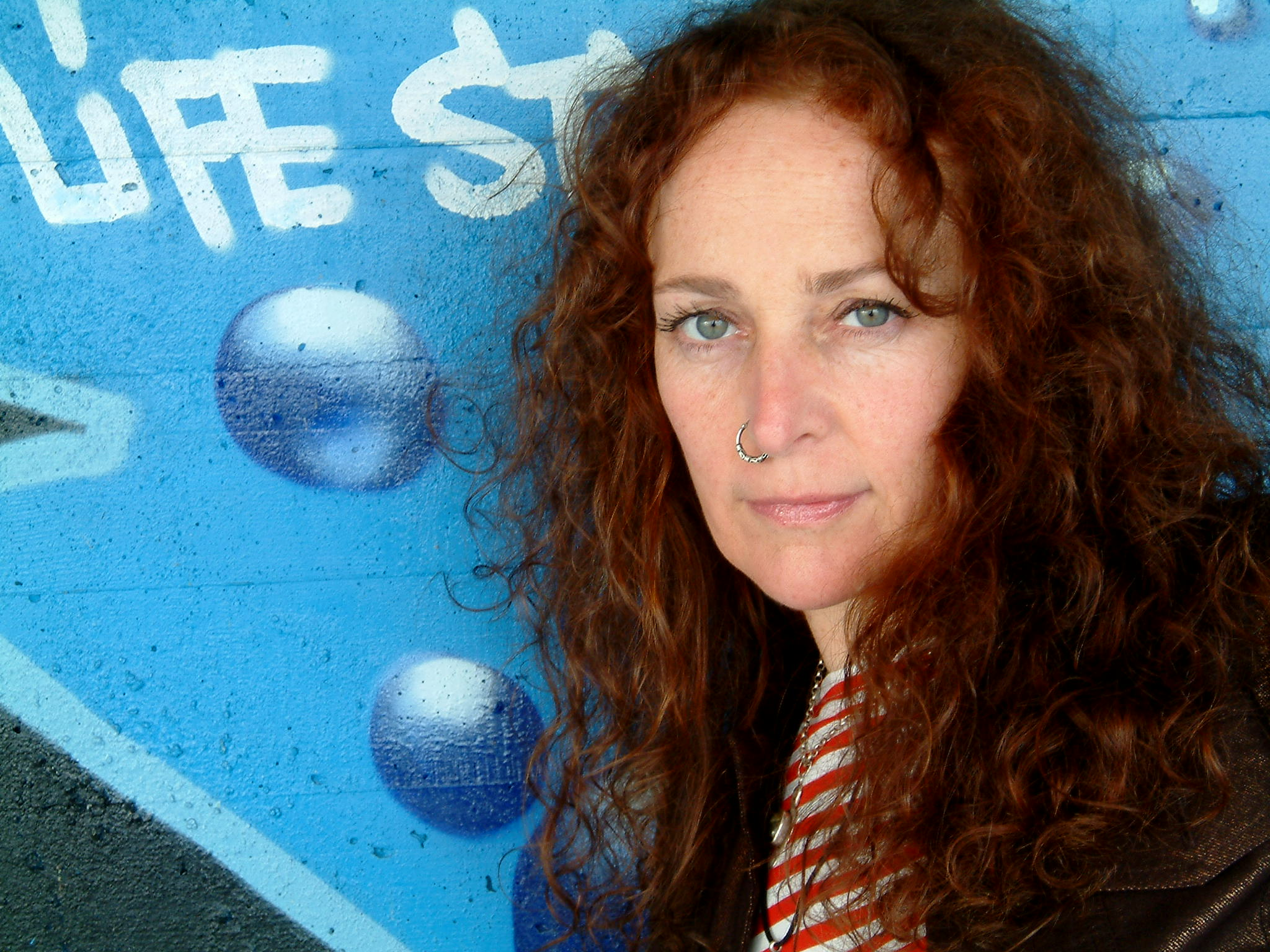
- Wallis in 2004
- Born: 1964 (age 61–62); Birmingham, England
- Occupations: DJ; singer; writer

Louise Wallis (born 1964) is an English DJ, singer, and writer who has campaigned for animal rights and veganism. She lived in London and now resides in South Wales.

== Early life ==
Wallis was born in 1964 into a musical family in Birmingham, England. She was raised by her mother and maternal grandparents. Her grandfather, Syd, had his own band, notorious in the post-war years for raucous all-night parties, and her great-grandmother Kitty was a celebrated pianist who played pubs and clubs into her 90s.

At age six, Wallis acquired a stepfather and a new brother; she also acquired a kitten to soften the blow of a sudden move to Southampton. Four years later, she gained a sister. She sought solace in the company of animals, developing a particular passion for horses. By the age of 18, she was a fully fledged animal activist and vegan.

== Animal advocacy ==
In 1988, as a Regional Campaigns Officer for the National Anti-Vivisection Society, she organised one of the largest national anti-vivisection marches ever held (25,000 people).

She then carried out undercover investigations in 1990. Seeing a job advert titled 'An Important Role working with Animals', she soon found herself working as a trainee animal technician with the drug company SmithKline Beecham. She applied for a job at a second animal research laboratory St Bartholomew's Medical School where she worked for several months before being sacked after, in all likelihood, a police tip off. In a bizarre twist of fate, Louise had moved into a flat on Burgoyne Road in north London, which had been vacated by another activist, John Barker, who was later unmasked as an undercover police spy. Nevertheless, Wallis's story made national press, and she was dubbed "Britain's No 1 Animals Rights Campaigner" by the Sunday Sport newspaper. With the National Anti-Vivisection Society she launched a 'Free the Beagles' campaign calling for the release of 24 dogs for whom she had cared at SmithKline Beecham; the company refused, and all 24 dogs were destroyed.

Wallis was president of The Vegan Society from 1992 to 1993. She commissioned and produced the charity's first film, Truth or Dairy, starring Benjamin Zephaniah and directed by Franny Armstrong.

In 1994 Wallis, Chair of The Vegan Society, founded World Vegan Day to commemorate the society's 50th anniversary. Vegans around the world now join together to celebrate animal rights every World Vegan Day, held annually on 1 November. However, the actual founding of The Vegan Society is thought to have been either 5 or 12 November 1944.

On 29 March 1995 she gave evidence on animal welfare at the infamous 'McLibel trial', the longest-running case in English history, which involved two activists sued by McDonald's for distributing a leaflet called "What's Wrong with McDonald's?" In 2013, it emerged that this leaflet had been co-written by another undercover police spy, Bob Lambert.

On 2 October 2010, Wallis gave a speech at the national 'March for Farmed Animals,' marking World Farm Animals Day.

She briefly returned to The Vegan Society as a director in November 2010, before resigning in June 2011. She continues to write for the Society's magazine The Vegan.

== Music ==
Under the pseudonym Luminous, Wallis DJs and sings in the band Luminous Frenzy, a collaboration with her guitarist / composer partner Frank Frenzy. Reviewers have compared her haunting, siren-like vocals to Sia, Alison Moyet and Portishead's Beth Gibbons.

Luminous Frenzy performed at the first Bestival in 2004, and the Big Chill Festival 2005. Big Chill founder Pete Lawrence later cited the band as one of several that year that he considered to be "at the cutting edge of musical progression". Luminous Frenzy's debut album, Violence Ambience (Freeport Records), was released in 2006, and launched at the Big Chill Bar. It included the track "McEmotion", written for and featured in McLibel, a film directed by Franny Armstrong and later selected by the British Film Institute for their series "Ten Documentaries That Shook the World". The critically acclaimed single "Three Cliffs Bay" followed in 2007, recorded with Adam Thomas. Expanding to a five-piece, Luminous Frenzy went on to develop a heavier rock-driven sound. This led them to record their next single, "Momentary/Random Generator", with producer Paul Sampson, whose credits include Catatonia and "Crash", a Top 3 US hit by The Primitives.

Wallis was voted one of the World's 'Top 100 Female DJs', in a comprehensive worldwide listing in the first, and so far only, poll of its kind. She was ranked 68 (19 in the UK), between Radio 1 DJs Annie Mac and Annie Nightingale. For many years she had a monthly DJ residency at the legendary venue The Foundry where she also appeared as a guest on Tracey Moberly's The Late, Late Breakfast Show with comedian Mark Thomas. A French house music fan and francophile, Wallis has performed twice at the French Institute's 12-hour extravaganza 'My Night With Philosophers'.

Combining her love of DJing and veganism, Wallis has created two popular vegan-themed DJ mixes. Vegan Anthems in 2010 was described by the award-winning blog Our Hen House as "an eclectic, moving, unexpectedly genius set." In 2011, Luminous created Vegan Artists – from Sigur Rós to Black Sabbath in what she described as "an odyssey."

== Writing ==
Wallis writes for various health and lifestyle magazines including Get Fresh!, Your Healthy Living, Vegetarian Living and The Vegan. She has interviewed musicians Johnny Marr, Moby and Geezer Butler, the dub poet Benjamin Zephaniah, and comedian Richard Herring, as well as vegan chefs Mimi Kirk and Mel Baker (aka the Kind Cook).
