= Plamil Foods =

British manufacturer of vegan foods

- Type: Private
- Founded: 1956 as the Plantmilk Society, 1965 as Plantmilk Ltd.
- Founder: Leslie J. Cross, C. Arthur Ling
- Headquarters: Folkestone, Kent, England
- Key people: Adrian Ling, managing director
- Products: Vegan goods
- Website: Plamil Foods

Plamil Foods is a British manufacturer of vegan food products. Founded in 1965, the company has produced and pioneered soy milk, egg-free mayonnaise, pea-based milk, yogurts, confection bars and chocolate.

The company began life in 1956 as the Plantmilk Society, which was set up by Leslie Cross, vice-president of the British Vegan Society, to explore how to produce a commercial soy milk as an alternative to dairy for vegans and others. Plamil became the first company in the UK, and one of the first in the Western world, to make soy milk widely available.

== Plant milk ==
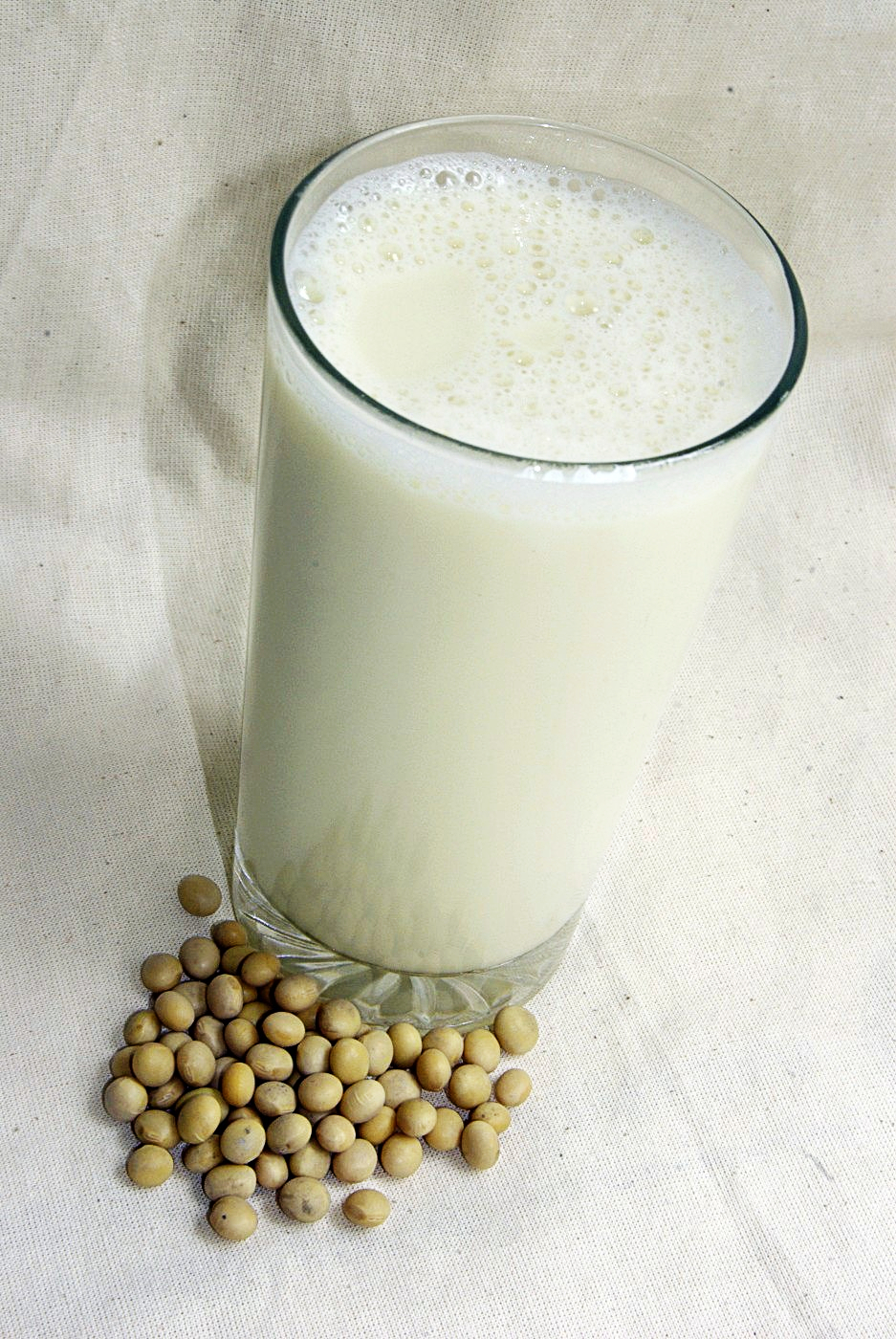
Soy protein is a complete protein, containing all the essential amino acids.

Plant milks have been produced for hundreds of years, particularly in China. According to the Soyinfo Center, almond milk ("Almaund mylke") was first mentioned in English in The Forme of Cury (c. 1390). There are early Western mentions of milk from the soy bean in June 1896 in the American Journal of Pharmacy and July 1897 in the United States Department of Agriculture's Farmer's Bulletin.

The first soy milk and soy-based infant formula in the West was developed in 1909 by John Ruhräh, an American paediatrician. Bottled soy milk was available commercially in China from the 1920s, and in 1931 Seventh-day Adventists in Madison, Tennessee, began production of soy milk fortified with calcium. In 1940 Vitasoy in Hong Kong began selling soy milk door to door. According to the Soyinfo Center, in the US the dairy industry put pressure on producers to call it something other than milk; one company used the term Soya Lac instead.

== History ==
=== Plantmilk Society ===
Plamil Foods began life as the Plantmilk Society, which was founded in June 1956 by Leslie James Cross (3 April 1911 – 2 December 1979), vice-president of The Vegan Society. The Vegan Society emerged in 1944 as a result of a split within the British Vegetarian Society over whether vegetarians should consume dairy products and eggs. Cross, who became a vegan in 1942, wrote regularly about the issue to the society's magazine, the Vegetarian Messenger, arguing that dairy-milk production was cruel and exploitative.

One of the early concerns of The Vegan Society was how to produce a commercial plant milk. In the spring of 1956, Cross placed an article in The Vegan proposing the creation of the Veganmilk Association. The aim would be to "produce and make available to the general public in Great Britain a milk, the ingredients of which would be of plant origin; which would satisfy nutritional requirements; and which would be palatable, attractive, and simple to use for the purposes for which dairy milk is now used."

Members decided to call it the Plantmilk Society. The London Evening News carried a story about the new society, under the headline "Now your milk may come from a plant." C. Arthur Ling (1919–2005) became the chair, and Leslie Cross the treasurer and secretary. (As of 2015 one of C. Arthur Ling's sons, Adrian, is the managing director of Plamil Foods.) The first annual general meeting was held on 6 October 1956 at Friends' House in Euston Road, London.

=== Plantmilk Ltd ===
It took several years of research and an investment of £20,000 to produce the soy milk, which was fortified with calcium and vitamins B_{2}, B_{12} and D_{2}. In 1965 the society became a limited company, Plantmilk Ltd, with Cross as its first full-time employee, and began production of its milk, which it called Plamil, from a rented factory in Iver, Buckinghamshire. A group of 16 vegans later took out loans to buy the freehold of a factory in Folkestone, Kent. Alan Stoddard was chairman of Plantmilk Ltd.

In 1972, the company changed its name to Plamil Foods. During the 1970s, echoing the pressure brought by the American dairy industry in the 1930s, the company was not allowed in England to refer to its product as "soya milk," but had to call it "liquid food of plant origin," and thereafter "soya plantmilk."

=== Plamil Foods ===
Arthur Ling moved the company from Slough to Folkestone in the 1972. The old factory in Slough was demolished to make room for the M4 motorway. In the 1980s, when his son Adrian was studying mechanical engineering at university, he asked him to come and help make vegan chocolate. The business is the first UK chocolate manufacturer to be certified organic. Adrian became the director of Plamil Foods.

== Products ==
Plamil products are suitable for vegans and are made by the company in its own factory. The company is a "free from" producer and is sought out by people with allergies, as well as by vegans. Their organic chocolate products are registered with the Soil Association. Their products were registered with The Vegan Society until 2009, but Plamil withdrew its support of the society's trademark after the latter agreed to certify products that might contain trace amounts of dairy milk, eggs or fish, as a result of contamination during manufacturing. Since then Plamil has used its own vegan logo, rather than the society's.

The company sells a range of chocolate products to chocolate manufacturers, food industry, food service and wholesale under its Plamil Vegan Chocolat brand and website as well as a range of seasonal and non seasonal retail products under its Plamil So free brand and website. Products are available online from the company's website, Animal Aid and Amazon, and as of 2015 are sold by Waitrose and Holland & Barrett.

== See also ==
- Alpro
- List of vegetarian and vegan companies
- Silk (soy milk)
- So Good (soy beverage)
