= Alan Stoddard =

British osteopath and activist (1915–2002)

- Born: 22 August 1915; Hale, Cheshire, England
- Died: 1 November 2002 (aged 87)
- Education: British School of Osteopathy; King's College, London
- Occupations: Osteopath, activist

Alan Stoddard (22 August 1915 – 1 November 2002) was an English osteopath and vegetarianism activist. He significantly advanced the acceptance of osteopathy and alternative medicine within the medical community. Stoddard was also influential in the vegetarian movement, serving as President of the East Surrey Vegetarian Society and chairman of Plantmilk Ltd, which produced a plant milk alternative to dairy in the 1960s.

== Biography ==
Alan Stoddard was born in Hale, Cheshire, on 22 August 1915. He was educated at the British School of Osteopathy and qualified in 1935. Stoddard set up his own practice at Herne Hill. He studied medicine at King's College London where he qualified MD in 1942 and joined the Royal Navy as a merchant ship doctor in Middlesbrough.

Stoddard became a teacher at the British School of Osteopathy and one of several doctors in the United Kingdom with dual qualifications. He was an appointed consultant at Brook Green Hospital. Stoddard offered his patients a mixture of conventional and osteopathic treatment which was unusual at the time. He worked for the National Health Service for 30 years and in private practice at Harley Street. Stoddard authored his MD thesis on osteochondrosis of the spine but it was never submitted as he had lost it on a train. He authored two textbooks on osteopathy and his book The Back: Relief from Pain was translated into eight languages. He has been cited as playing a major role in the growth of osteopathy in the 20th century.

Stoddard was chairman of the Osteopathic Medical Association. In 1969, Stoddard's book Manual Of Osteopathic Practice was criticized by D. A. H. Yates in The British Medical Journal for inaccuracies relating to physiology. H. A. Burt in a review for Rheumatology commented that "one gets the impression that the author is trying too hard to justify the use of manipulative procedures, this is quite unnecessary in someone of his repute in this field".

Stoddard was known for pioneering an osteopathic manipulation technique for chronic lumbar disc prolapse under general anaesthesia. In 1973, Stoddard and James Cyriax were invited to speak about the use of spinal manipulation in rehabilitation for the British Orthopaedic Association.

Stoddard died on 1 November 2002 at the age of 87.

== Vegetarianism ==
Stoddard was a lifelong vegetarian and was invited to travel to India by the Vegetarian Society in the 1950s. He attended the 18th World Vegetarian Congress in 1965 and was a speaker at the 25th World Vegetarian Congress in 1979. Stoddard was President of Croydon Vegetarian Society which merged with Caterham District Vegetarian Society in 1958 to become the East Surrey Vegetarian Society.

Stoddard was chairman of Plantmilk Ltd, a society that was founded to produce plant milk alternatives to dairy. In the 1960s, Plantmilk was made from a mixture of soy, cabbage leaves, cane sugar with fortified calcium, Vitamin B12 and Vitamin D. The cabbage leaves were put into an apparatus known as a "food tec" with sharp blades to divide it into tiny pieces. Water would then be added and the chlorophyll would be separated from the protein by the use of charcoal. The fluid would then be heated to precipitate the protein and would be concentrated to form a "curd". A small amount of starch would be added from soy protein isolate and all the ingredients would be placed in a mixer and then de-aerated and finally homogenized.

Plantmilk cost twice as much as cow's milk but lasted longer and was described as twice as strong. In 1966, Stoddard commented that "the combination of leaf protein and soya protein contain the complete range of known amino-acids, and we are satisfied that Plantmilk alone would sustain healthy life from the protein point of view".

== Selected publications ==
- A Manual of Osteopathic Techniques (1959)
- Manual of Osteopathic Practice (1969)
- The Back: Relief from Pain (1979)
- An Osteopathic Approach to Manipulation (1990). In: Join K. Paterson, Loïc Burn: Back pain. An international review. Springer.
