= Veganism =

Non-usage of animal products

- The symbol widely used to denote a vegan-friendly product
- Pronunciation: Veganism /ˈviːɡənɪzəm/ VEE-gə-niz-əm; Vegan /ˈviːɡən/ VEE-gən (Note: Other common but less frequent pronunciations recorded by the Merriam-Webster Online Dictionary and the Random House Dictionary are /ˈveɪɡən/ VAY-gən and /ˈvɛdʒən/ VEJ-ən. The word was coined in Britain by Dorothy Morgan and Donald Watson, who preferred the pronunciation /ˈviːɡən/ VEE-gən, and the 1997 edition of the Random House Dictionary reported that this pronunciation was considered "especially British" and that /ˈvɛdʒən/ VEJ-ən was the most frequent and only other common American pronunciation.)
- Description: Avoiding the use of animal products
- Notable early proponents: Al-Ma'arri (c. 973 – c. 1057) (Note: "[Al-Maʿarri's] diet was extremely frugal, consisting chiefly of lentils, with figs for sweet; and, very unusually for a Muslim, he was not only a vegetarian, but a vegan who abstained from meat, fish, dairy products, eggs, and honey, because he did not want to kill or hurt animals, or deprive them of their food."); Roger Crab (1621–1680); Johann Conrad Beissel (1691–1768); James Pierrepont Greaves (1777–1842); Lewis Gompertz (c. 1784–1861); Amos Bronson Alcott (1799–1888); Donald Watson (1910–2005)
- Term coined by: Dorothy Morgan and Donald Watson (November 1944)
- Notable vegans: List of vegans
- Notable publications: List of vegan and plant-based media

Veganism is the practice of abstaining from the use of animal products and the consumption of animal source foods, and an associated philosophy that rejects the commodity status of animals. A person who practices veganism is known as a vegan; the word is also used to describe foods and materials that are compatible with veganism.

Ethical veganism excludes all forms of animal use, whether in agriculture for labour or food (e.g., meat, fish and other animal seafood, eggs, honey, and dairy products such as milk or cheese), in clothing and fashion (e.g., leather, wool, fur, and some cosmetics), in entertainment (e.g., rodeos, bullfighting, zoos, circuses, dolphinariums and horse racing), in services (e.g., mounted police, working animals, K9s and animal testing), and in medicine (e.g., bile bear farms, wildlife trade). People who follow a vegan diet for the benefits to the environment, their health, or for religion are regularly also described as vegans.

Although individuals have been renouncing the consumption of products of animal origin since ancient times, the term "veganism" itself was coined in 1944 by Donald and Dorothy Watson. The aim was to differentiate it from vegetarianism, which rejects the consumption of meat but accepts the consumption of other products of animal origin, such as milk, honey, dairy products, and eggs.

Interest in veganism increased significantly in the 2010s.

== Definition ==
Distinctions may be made between several categories of veganism. "Ethical veganism" means avoiding using animals, animal products, and animal-tested products for any purpose, when practicable. (Note: Gary Francione (The Animal Rights Debate, 2010): "Although veganism may represent a matter of diet or lifestyle for some, ethical veganism is a profound moral and political commitment to abolition on the individual level and extends not only to matters of food but also to the wearing or using of animal products." This terminology is controversial within the vegan community. While some vegan leaders, such as Karen Dawn, endorse efforts to avoid animal consumption for any reason; others, including Francione, believe that veganism must be part of a holistic ethical and political movement in order to support animal liberation. Accordingly, the latter group rejects the label "dietary vegan", referring instead to "strict vegetarians", "pure vegetarians", or followers of a plant-based diet.) The motivation behind this is concern about animal welfare. Another term is "environmental veganism", which refers to the avoidance of animal products on the grounds that the industrial farming of animals is environmentally damaging and unsustainable. "Dietary veganism", whose practitioners are also known as "strict vegetarians", refrain from consuming meat, eggs, dairy products, and any other animal-derived substances. This can be for religious reasons too. (Note: Brenda Davis, Vesanto Melina (Becoming Vegan, 2013): "There are degrees of veganism. A pure vegetarian or dietary vegan is someone who consumes a vegan diet but doesn't lead a vegan lifestyle. Pure vegetarians may use animal products, support the use of animals in research, wear leather clothing, or have no objection to the exploitation of animals for entertainment. They are mostly motivated by personal health concerns rather than by ethical objections. Some may adopt a more vegan lifestyle as they are exposed to vegan philosophy." Laura H. Kahn, Michael S. Bruner ("Politics on Your Plate", 2012): "A vegetarian is a person who abstains from eating NHA [non-human animal] flesh of any kind. A vegan goes further, abstaining from eating anything made from NHA. Thus, a vegan does not consume eggs and dairy foods. Going beyond dietary veganism, 'lifestyle' vegans also refrain from using leather, wool or any NHA-derived ingredient." Vegetarian and vegan diets may be referred to as plant-based and vegan diets as entirely plant-based or plant-exclusive.)

Since 1988, The UK's Vegan Society gives this definition of veganism:

Veganism is a philosophy and way of living which seeks to exclude—as far as is possible and practicable—all forms of exploitation of, and cruelty to, animals for food, clothing or any other purpose; and by extension, promotes the development and use of animal-free alternatives for the benefit of animals, humans and the environment. In dietary terms it denotes the practice of dispensing with all products derived wholly or partly from animals.

— The Vegan Society, Definition of veganism

A 2021 study found this to be the most popular definition amongst vegans from a number of other prominent definitions. It also found that while most vegans ranked diet-only based definitions such as "strict vegetarianism" last, non-vegans picked these far more frequently.

The German Ministry for Consumer Protection approved a definition for food suitable for vegans on 22 April 2016. In 2021, the International Organization for Standardization published standard ISO 23662 on "definitions and technical criteria for foods and food ingredients suitable for vegetarians or vegans and for labelling and claims". However, this was rejected by the Dutch Vegan Association who found the standard inconsistent with their vision.

== History ==
=== Early history ===
Vegetarianism can be traced back to the Indus Valley civilization in 3300–1300 BCE in the Indian subcontinent, particularly in northern and western ancient India. Early vegetarians included Indian philosophers such as Parshavnatha, Mahavira, Acharya Kundakunda, Umaswati, Samantabhadra, and Valluvar, as well as the Indian emperors Chandragupta Maurya and Ashoka.

One of the earliest known vegans was the Arab poet al-Ma'arri, famous for his poem "I No Longer Steal From Nature". (c. 973 – c. 1057). Another vegan who predated the term vegan was English philosopher Lewis Gompertz. The Irish farmer Robert Cook (1646–1726) was a vegan who also predated the term; he did not eat any animal products and did not wear wool or leather, on account of his Protestant interpretation of biblical verses.

Ancient vegan arguments were based on health, the transmigration of souls, animal welfare, and the view — espoused by Porphyry in De Abstinentia ab Esu Animalium ("On Abstinence from Animal Food", c. 268 – c. 270) — that if humans deserve justice, then so do animals.

=== 19th century ===
Vegetarianism established itself as a significant movement in 19th-century Britain and the United States. A minority of vegetarians avoided animal food entirely. In 1813, the poet Percy Bysshe Shelley published A Vindication of Natural Diet, advocating "abstinence from animal food and spirituous liquors", and in 1815, William Lambe, a London physician, said that his "water and vegetable diet" could cure anything from tuberculosis to acne. Lambe called animal food a "habitual irritation" and argued that "milk eating and flesh-eating are but branches of a common system and they must stand or fall together". Sylvester Graham's meatless Graham diet—mostly fruit, vegetables, water, and bread made at home with stoneground flour—became popular as a health remedy in the 1830s in the United States. The first known vegan cookbook was Asenath Nicholson's Kitchen Philosophy for Vegetarians, published in 1849.

Several vegan communities were established around this time. In Massachusetts, Amos Bronson Alcott, father of the novelist Louisa May Alcott, opened the Temple School in 1834 and Fruitlands in 1844, (Note: In 1838 William Alcott, Amos's cousin, published Vegetable Diet: As Sanctioned by Medical Men and By Experience in All Ages (1838). The word vegetarian appears in the second edition but not the first.) and in England, James Pierrepont Greaves founded the Concordium, a vegan community at Alcott House on Ham Common, in 1838.

=== Early 20th century ===
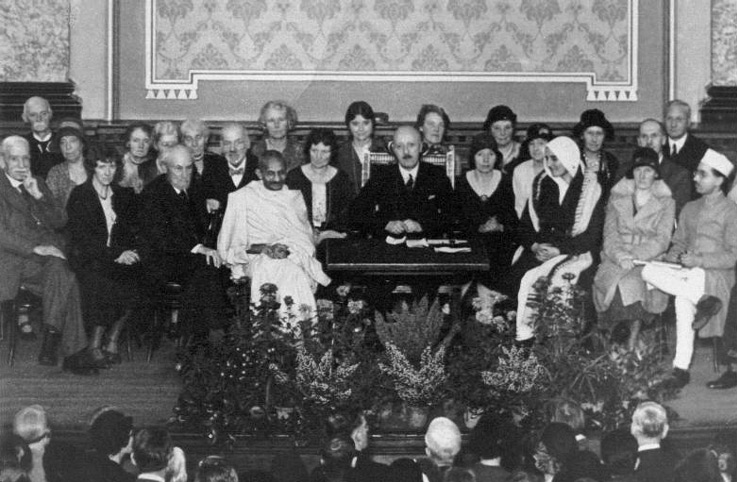
Mahatma Gandhi, London Vegetarian Society, 20 November 1931, with Henry S. Salt on his right (Note: Mahatma Gandhi, address to the Vegetarian Society, 20 November 1931: "I feel especially honoured to find on my right, Mr. Henry Salt. It was Mr. Salt's book 'A Plea for Vegetarianism', which showed me why apart from a hereditary habit, and apart from my adherence to a vow administered to me by my mother, it was right to be a vegetarian. He showed me why it was a moral duty incumbent on vegetarians not to live upon fellow-animals. It is, therefore, a matter of additional pleasure to me that I find Mr. Salt in our midst.")

C. W. Daniel published an early vegan cookbook, Rupert H. Wheldon's No Animal Food: Two Essays and 100 Recipes, in 1910. The consumption of milk and eggs became a battleground over the following decades within the Vegetarian Society. There were regular discussions about it in the Vegetarian Messenger; it appears from the correspondence pages that many opponents of veganism were vegetarians.

During a visit to London in 1931, Mahatma Gandhi—who had joined the Vegetarian Society's executive committee when he lived in London from 1888 to 1891—gave a speech to the Society arguing that it ought to promote a meat-free diet as a matter of morality, not health. Lacto-vegetarians acknowledged the ethical consistency of the vegan position but regarded a vegan diet as impracticable and were concerned that it might be an impediment to spreading vegetarianism if vegans found themselves unable to participate in social circles where no non-animal food was available. This became the predominant view of the Vegetarian Society, which in 1935 stated: "The lacto-vegetarians, on the whole, do not defend the practice of consuming the dairy products except on the ground of expediency."

=== Etymology ===
External images
- The Vegan News, first edition, 1944
- Donald Watson, front row, fourth left, 1947

In August 1944, several members of the Vegetarian Society asked that a section of its newsletter be devoted to non-dairy vegetarianism. When the request was denied, Donald Watson, secretary of the Leicester branch, set up a new quarterly newsletter, The Vegan News, in November 1944. The word vegan was invented by Watson and Dorothy Morgan, a schoolteacher he later married. The word is based on "the first three and last two letters of 'vegetarian'" because it marked, in Watson's words, "the beginning and end of vegetarian". The Vegan News asked its readers if they could think of anything better than vegan to stand for "non-dairy vegetarian". They suggested allvega, neo-vegetarian, dairyban, vitan, benevore, sanivores, and beaumangeur.

According to Joanne Stepaniak, the word vegan was first published independently in 1962 by the Oxford Illustrated Dictionary, defined as "a vegetarian who eats no butter, eggs, cheese, or milk".

=== Founding of The Vegan Society ===
The first edition of The Vegan News attracted more than 100 letters, including from George Bernard Shaw, who resolved to give up eggs and dairy. The Vegan Society held its first meeting in early November at the Attic Club, 144 High Holborn, London. In attendance were Donald Watson, Elsie B. Shrigley, Fay K. Henderson, Alfred Hy Haffenden, Paul Spencer and Bernard Drake, with Mme Pataleewa (Barbara Moore, a Russian-British engineer) observing. Later that month, the Vegan Society published its manifesto which advocated that diet "should exclude flesh, fish, fowl, eggs, honey, and animal's milk, butter, and cheese" and encouraged "the manufacture and use of alternatives to animal commodities." World Vegan Day is held every 1 November to mark the founding of the Society, and the Society considers November World Vegan Month.

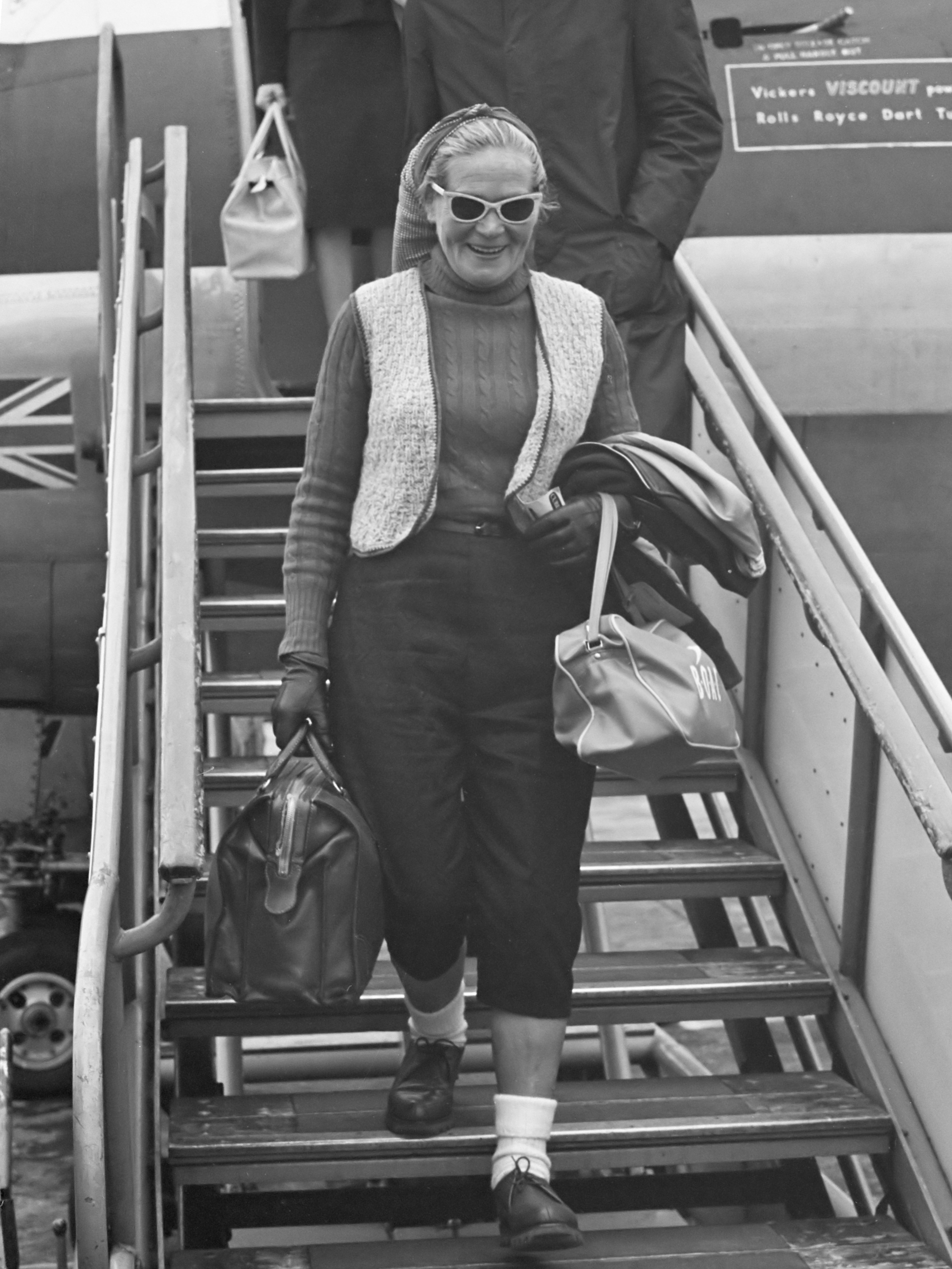
Barbara Moore attended the first meeting of The Vegan Society as an observer.

The Vegan News changed its name to The Vegan in November 1945, by which time it had 500 subscribers. It published recipes and a "vegan trade list" of animal-free products, such as toothpastes, shoe polishes, stationery and glue. Vegan books appeared, including Vegan Recipes by Fay K. Henderson (1946) and Aids to a Vegan Diet for Children by Kathleen V. Mayo (1948).

The Vegan Society soon made clear that it rejected the use of animals for any purpose, not only in diet. In 1947, Watson wrote: "The vegan renounces it as superstitious that human life depends upon the exploitation of these creatures whose feelings are much the same as our own". From 1948, The Vegan's front page read: "Advocating living without exploitation", and in 1951, the Society published its definition of veganism as "the doctrine that man should live without exploiting animals". In 1956, its vice-president, Leslie Cross, founded the Plantmilk Society and in 1965, as Plantmilk Ltd and later Plamil Foods, it began production of one of the first widely distributed soy milks in the Western world.

=== Spread to the United States ===
The first vegan society in the United States was founded in 1948 by Catherine Nimmo and Rubin Abramowitz in California, who distributed Watson's newsletter. In 1960, H. Jay Dinshah founded the American Vegan Society (AVS), linking veganism to the concept of ahimsa, "non-harming" in Sanskrit.

=== Late 20th century ===
In the 1960s and 1970s, a vegetarian food movement emerged as part of the counterculture in the United States that focused on concerns about diet, the environment, and a distrust of food producers, leading to increasing interest in organic gardening. One of the most influential vegetarian books of that time was Frances Moore Lappé's 1971 Diet for a Small Planet. It sold more than three million copies and suggested "getting off the top of the food chain".

The following decades saw research by a group of scientists and doctors in the U.S., including Dean Ornish, Caldwell Esselstyn, Neal D. Barnard, John A. McDougall, Michael Greger, and biochemist T. Colin Campbell, who argued that diets based on animal fat and animal protein, such as the Western pattern diet, were unhealthy. They produced a series of books that recommend vegan or vegetarian diets, including McDougall's The McDougall Plan (1983), John Robbins's Diet for a New America (1987), which associated meat production with environmental damage, and Dr. Dean Ornish's Program for Reversing Heart Disease (1990). In 2003 two major North American dietitians' associations claimed that well-planned vegan diets were suitable for all life stages. This was followed by the film Earthlings (2005), Campbell's The China Study (2005), Rory Freedman and Kim Barnouin's Skinny Bitch (2005), Jonathan Safran Foer's Eating Animals (2009), and the film Forks Over Knives (2011).

In the 1980s, veganism became associated with punk subculture and ideologies, particularly straight edge hardcore punk in the U.S. and anarcho-punk in the United Kingdom. This association continues into the 21st century, as evidenced by the prominence of vegan punk events such as Fluff Fest in Europe.

=== 21st century ===
The vegan diet became increasingly mainstream in the 2010s, especially in the latter half. The Economist declared 2019 "the year of the vegan". Chain restaurants began marking vegan items on their menus and supermarkets improved their selection of vegan-processed food. Interest in veganism rose significantly in this decade.

The global mock-meat market increased by 18 percent between 2005 and 2010, and in the U.S. by eight percent between 2012 and 2015, to $553 million a year. The Vegetarian Butcher (De Vegetarische Slager), the first known vegetarian butcher shop, selling mock meats, opened in the Netherlands in 2010, while America's first vegan butcher, the Herbivorous Butcher, opened in Minneapolis in 2016. Since 2017, more than 12,500 chain restaurant locations have begun offering Beyond Meat and Impossible Foods products, including Carl's Jr. outlets offering Beyond Burgers and Burger King outlets serving Impossible Whoppers. Plant-derived meat sales in the U.S. grew 37% between 2017 and 2019.

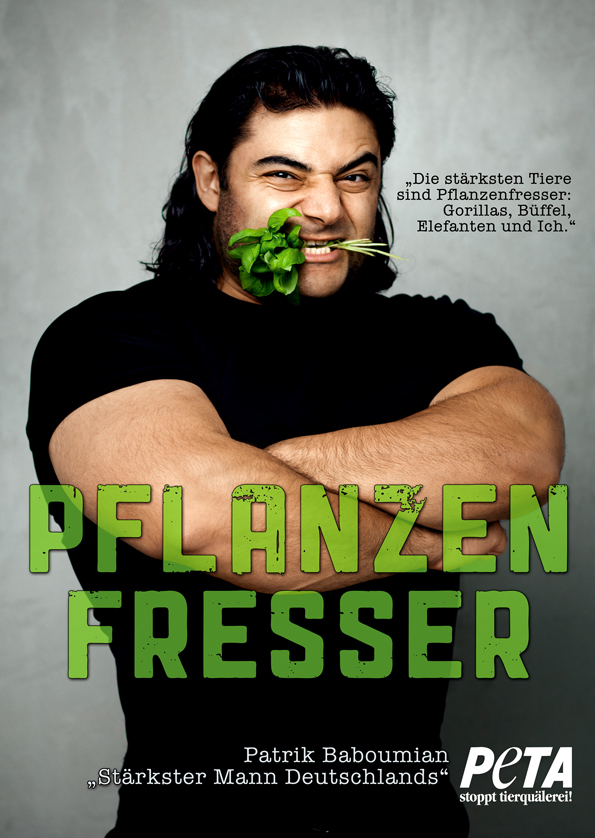
German strongman Patrik Baboumian, who starred in the 2018 documentary The Game Changers to demonstrate that athletes can thrive on a vegan diet

In 2011, Europe's first vegan supermarkets appeared in Germany: Veganz in Berlin and Vegilicious in Dortmund. In 2013, the Oktoberfest in Munich (traditionally a meat-heavy event) offered vegan dishes for the first time in its 200-year history.

By 2016, 49% of Americans were drinking plant milk, and 91% still drank dairy milk. In the U.K., the plant milk market increased by 155 percent in two years, from 36 million litres (63 million imperial pints) in 2011 to 92 million (162 million imperial pints) in 2013. There was a 185% increase in new vegan products between 2012 and 2016 in the U.K. In 2017, the United States School Nutrition Association found 14% of school districts across the country were serving vegan school meals compared to 11.5% of schools offering vegan lunch in 2016.

In total, as of 2016, the largest share of vegan consumers globally currently reside in Asia Pacific with nine percent of people following a vegan diet. In 2017, veganism rose in popularity in Hong Kong and China, particularly among millennials. China's vegan market was estimated to rise by more than 17% between 2015 and 2020, which is expected to be "the fastest growth rate internationally in that period". This exceeds the projected growth in the second and third fastest-growing vegan markets internationally in the same period, the United Arab Emirates (10.6%) and Australia (9.6%), respectively.

In 2018, Jacy Reese Anthis's book The End of Animal Farming argued that veganism will completely replace animal-based food by 2100. The book was featured in The Guardian, The New Republic, and Forbes, among other newspapers and magazines.

The growth of schools serving vegan school meals has increased in recent years with the lunches added by Los Angeles, California in 2018, Portland, Maine in 2019, and New York City in 2022.

In January 2021, 582,538 people from 209 countries and territories signed up for Veganuary, breaking the previous year's record of 400,000. That month, ONA in France became the first vegan restaurant in the country to receive a Michelin star. That year, 79 more vegan restaurants around the world received Michelin stars. At the end of the year, a poll conducted by The Guardian showed that a new high of 36% of the British public were interested in veganism.

== Prevalence across the globe ==
The prevalence of veganism differs wildly per country and region and a minority everywhere. Vegans account for about 9% of the population in both India and Mexico, and about 2% in many developed Western countries.

The city with the most vegan restaurants per resident in 2021 according to data collected from HappyCow was Chiang Mai (Thailand), followed by Ubud (Bali, Indonesia), Phuket (Thailand), Tel Aviv (Israel), and Lisbon (Portugal).

== Vegan cuisine and foods ==
Vegan cuisine is a style of cooking defined by the inclusion of grains, legumes, nuts, vegetables, fruits, meat alternatives (including tofu, tempeh, and seitan), vegan cheese, and plant milks and by the exclusion of animal-based dairy, eggs, animal-based meat and animal tissue products (such as gelatin or animal-derived rennet), and insect-based honey. Vegan cuisine differs from vegetarian cuisine, which often includes honey, dairy, and eggs.

=== Meat alternatives ===
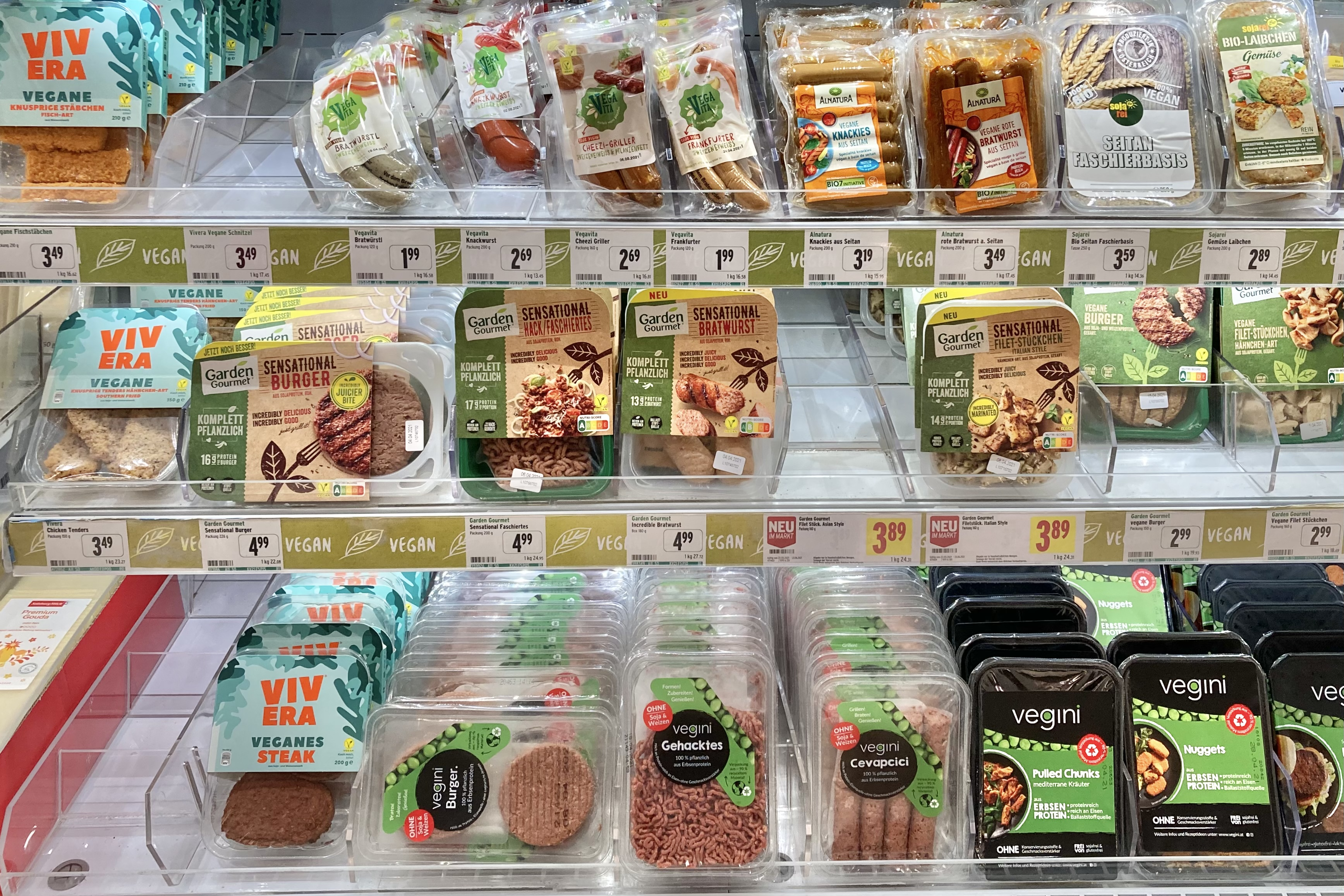
Mock meats in a supermarket in Vienna

Vegan meat alternatives are commonly sold in forms like vegetarian sausage, mince, or veggie burgers. They are often made from soybeans, seitan (wheat gluten), beans, lentils, rice, mushrooms or vegetables. Meat substitutes have been made in China since at least the Tang dynasty (618 to 907 common era), including mock duck made from seitan. They are much newer to Western countries. Some famous Western producers of vegan meat alternatives include Impossible Foods and Beyond Meat. In the late 2010s many meat producers and supermarkets also started making their own brands of vegan meat substitutes as well.

=== Plant milk and dairy product alternatives ===
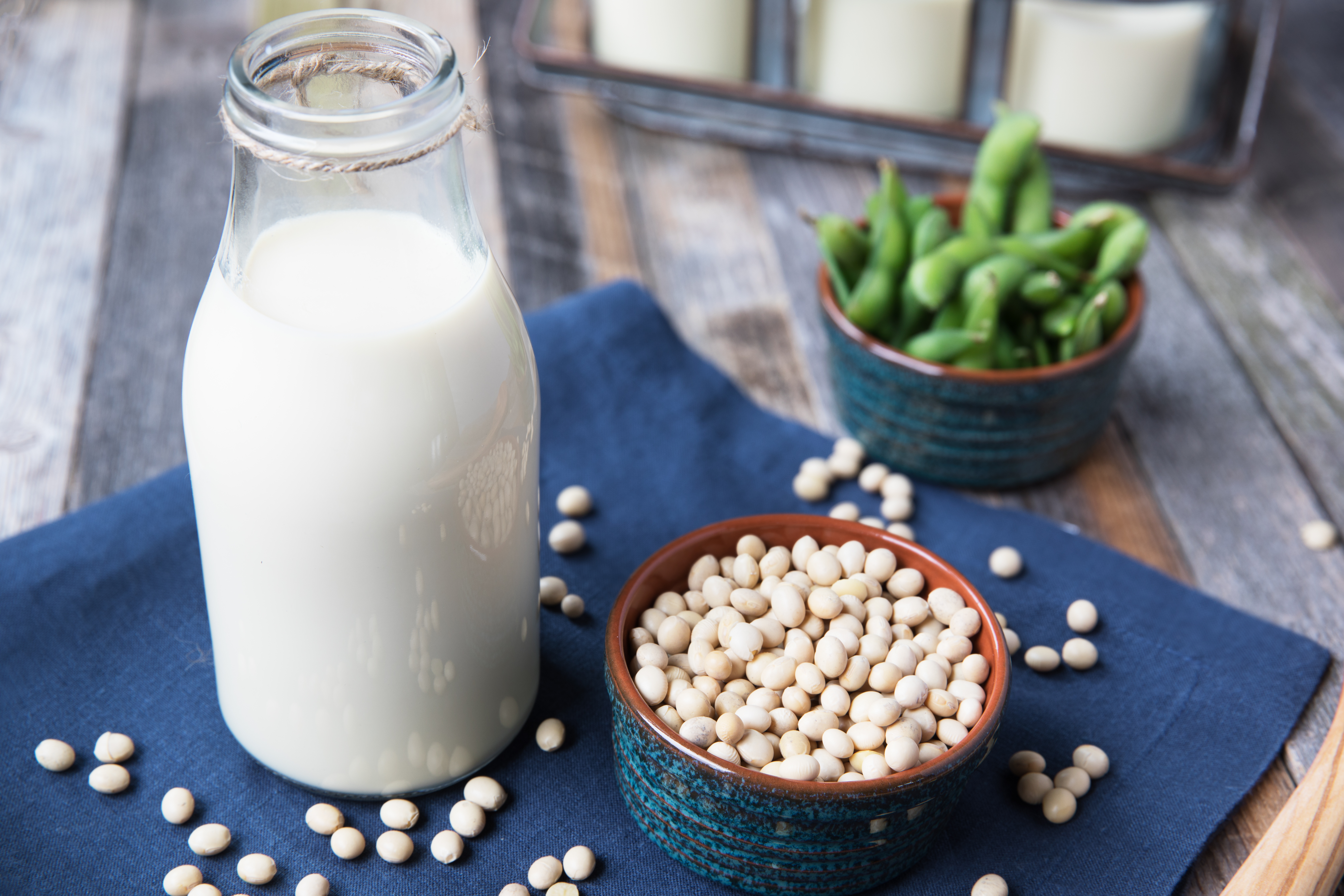
Soy milk

Plant milks—such as soy milk, almond milk, cashew milk, grain milks (oat milk, flax milk and rice milk), hemp milk, and coconut milk—are used in place of cow or goat milk. (Note: Plant-milk brands include Dean Foods' Silk soy milk and almond milk; Blue Diamond's Almond Breeze, Taste the Dream's Almond Dream, and Rice Dream; and Plamil Foods' Organic Soya and Alpro's Soya. Vegan ice-creams include Swedish Glace, Food Heaven, Tofutti, Turtle Mountain's So Delicious and Luna & Larry's Coconut Bliss.) Soy milk provides around 7 g (1/4oz) of protein per cup (240 mL or 8 fl oz), compared with 8 g (2/7oz) of protein per cup of cow's milk. Almond milk is lower in dietary energy, carbohydrates, and protein.

Neither plant milk nor cow milk should be used as a replacement for breast milk for babies. Babies who are not breastfed may be fed commercial infant formula, normally based on cow milk or soy. The latter is known as soy-based infant formula or SBIF.

Butter and margarine can be replaced with alternate vegan products. Vegan cheeses are made from seeds, soybeans, coconut oil, tapioca, and rice, among other ingredients; and can replicate the meltability of dairy cheese. Nutritional yeast is also a common substitute for the taste of cheese in vegan recipes. Dairy yoghurt can be replaced with plant-derived products such as soy yoghurt. Various types of plant cream have been created to replace dairy cream, and some types of imitation whipped cream are non-dairy.

In the 2010s and 2020s, a number of companies have genetically engineered yeast to produce cow milk proteins, whey, or fat, without the use of cows. These include Perfect Day, Novacca, Motif FoodWorks, Remilk, Final Foods, and Circe.

Nutritional content of cows', soy, and almond milk
	Cows' milk (whole, vitamin D added)	Soy milk (unsweetened; fortified)	Silk almond milk (unsweetened original; fortified)
Dietary energy per 240 mL cup	620 kJ (149 kcal)	330 kJ (80 kcal)	120 kJ (29 kcal)
Protein (g)	7.69	6.95	1
Fat (g)	7.93	3.91	2.5
Saturated fat (g)	4.55	0.5	0
Carbohydrate (g)	11.71	4.23	1
Fibre (g)	0	1.2	1
Sugars (g)	12.32	1	0
Calcium (mg)	276	301	451
Potassium (mg)	322	292	36
Sodium (mg)	105	90	170
Vitamin B_{12} (μg)	1.10	2.70	3
Vitamin A (IU)	395	503	499
Vitamin D (IU)	124	119	101
Cholesterol (mg)	24	0	0

=== Egg replacements ===
Baking powder, silken (soft) tofu, mashed potato, bananas, flaxseeds, and aquafaba from chickpeas can also be used as egg substitutes. Which one of these works depends on the egg property the replacement is meant to emulate. Scrambled tofu, for instance, replaces scrambled eggs, but tofu does not act as a binding agent for cakes like raw eggs, flaxseeds or bananas do. As of 2019 in the U.S., many vegan egg substitutes were available, including products used for "scrambled" eggs, cakes, cookies, and doughnuts.

=== Raw veganism ===
Raw veganism, combining veganism and raw foodism, excludes all animal products and food cooked above 48 °C (118 °F). A raw vegan diet includes vegetables, fruits, nuts, grain and legume sprouts, seeds, and sea vegetables. There are many variations of the diet, including fruitarianism.

== Animal products ==
=== General ===
While vegans broadly abstain from animal products, there are many ways in which animal products are used, and different individuals and organizations that identify with the practice of veganism may use some limited animal products based on philosophy, means or other concerns. Philosopher Gary Steiner argues that it is not possible to be entirely vegan, because animal use and products are "deeply and imperceptibly woven into the fabric of human society".

Animal Ingredients A to Z (2004) and Veganissimo A to Z (2013) list which ingredients might be animal-derived. The British Vegan Society's sunflower logo and PETA's bunny logo mean the product is certified vegan, which includes no animal testing. The Leaping Bunny logo signals no animal testing, but it might not be vegan. The Vegan Society criteria for vegan certification are that the product contain no animal products, and that neither the finished item nor its ingredients have been tested on animals by, or on behalf of, the manufacturer or by anyone over whom the manufacturer has control. Its website contains a list of certified products, as does Australia's Choose Cruelty Free (CCF). The British Vegan Society will certify a product only if it is free of animal involvement as far as possible and practical, including animal testing, but "recognises that it is not always possible to make a choice that avoids the use of animals", an issue that was highlighted in 2016 when it became known that the UK's newly introduced £5 note contained tallow.

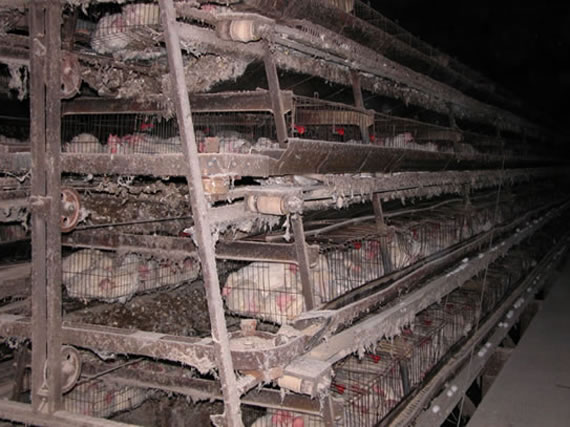
Modern methods of factory farming are considered highly unethical by most vegans.

=== Clothing ===
Many clothing products may be made of animal products such as silk, wool (including lambswool, shearling, cashmere, angora, mohair, and a number of other fine wools), fur, feathers, pearls, animal-derived dyes, leather, snakeskin, or other kinds of skin or animal product. Most leather clothing is made from cow skins. Vegans discourage the use of leather but may continue to wear leather they bought before adopting the diet on the grounds that they are not financially supporting the meat industry. However, vegans try to work towards a point where they no longer own animal products. Ethical vegans may wear clothing items and accessories made of non-animal-derived materials such as hemp, linen, cotton, canvas, polyester, artificial leather (pleather), rubber, and vinyl. Leather alternatives can come from materials such as cork, piña (from pineapples), cactus, and mushroom leather. Some vegan clothes, in particular leather alternatives, are made of petroleum-based products, which has triggered criticism because of the environmental damage involved in their production.

=== Toiletries ===
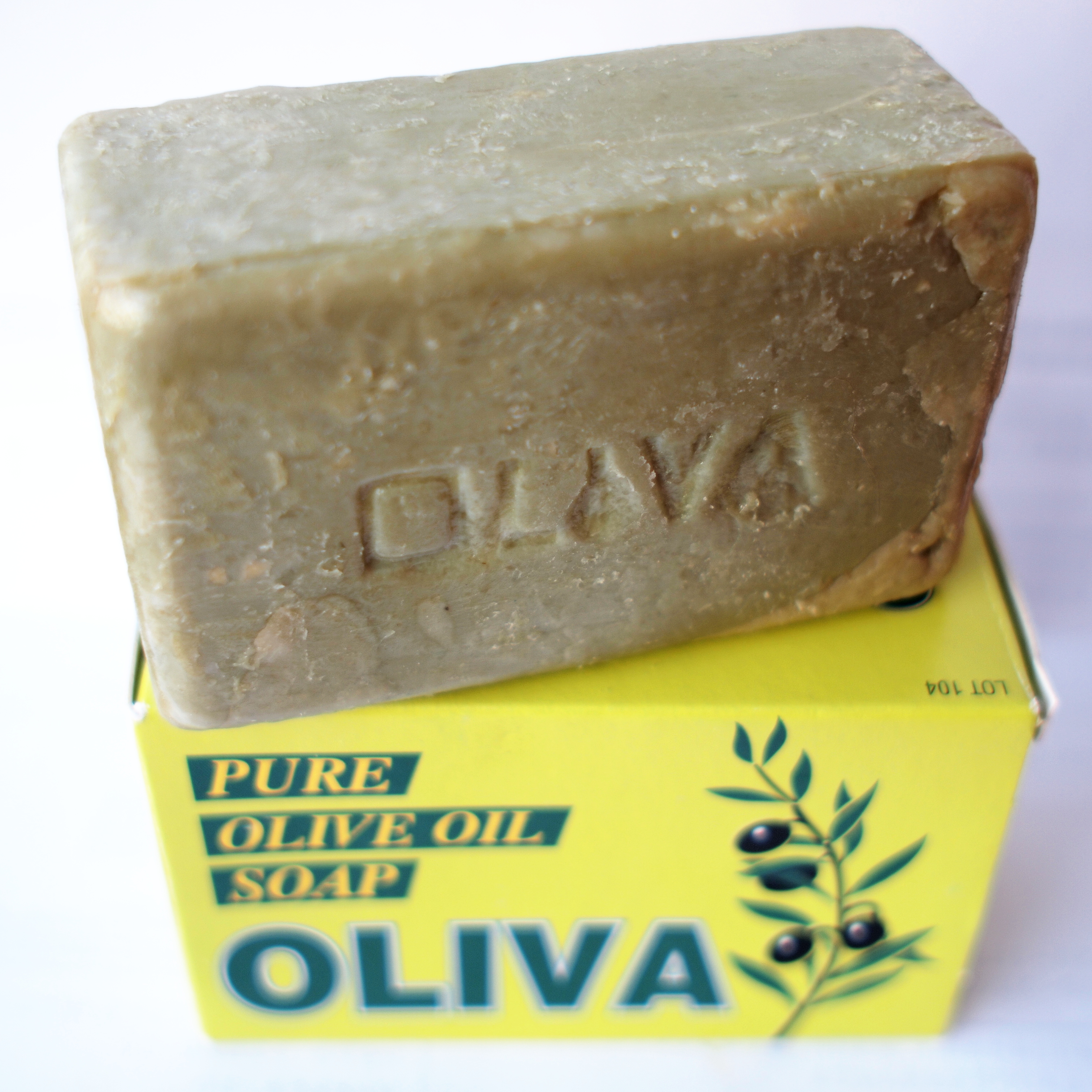
Vegan soaps can be made from olive oil. Other soap is sometimes made from tallow (animal fat).

While dietary vegans might use animal products in toiletries, ethical veganism extends not only to matters of food but also to the use of animal products, and rejects the commodification of animals altogether. Ethical vegans replace personal care products and household cleaners containing animal products with vegan products. Animal ingredients are ubiquitous because they are relatively inexpensive. After animals are slaughtered for meat, the leftovers are put through a rendering process and some of that material, particularly the fat, is used in toiletries. Vegans also avoid using sea sponges.

Common animal-derived ingredients include tallow in soap; collagen-derived glycerine, which used as a lubricant and humectant in many haircare products, moisturizers, shaving foams, soaps and toothpastes; lanolin from sheep's wool, often found in lip balm and moisturizers; stearic acid, a common ingredient in face creams, shaving foam and shampoos (like glycerine, it can be plant-derived, but is usually animal-derived); lactic acid, an alpha-hydroxy acid derived from animal milk, used in moisturizers; allantoin—from the comfrey plant or cow urine—found in shampoos, moisturizers and toothpaste; and carmine from scale insects, such as the female cochineal, used in food and cosmetics to produce red and pink shades;

Beauty Without Cruelty, founded as a charity in 1959, was one of the earliest manufacturers and certifiers of animal-free personal care products.

=== Hair extensions ===
Ethical vegans may avoid natural hair extensions, including those made from human hair, because of concerns about human or animal exploitation involved in sourcing the hair. Synthetic hair extensions are used by some ethical vegans as an alternative, but are generally avoided by environmental vegans due to their poor biodegradability.

=== Insect products ===
Honey, silk, and other direct insect products are not considered suitable for vegans. Exploiting the labour of bees and harvesting their energy source is seen as immoral, and commercial beekeeping operations can harm and even kill bees. In addition to eating insects whole, a number of common additives are made from or by insects and therefore not vegan, e.g.: Cochineal (E120), Shellac (E904), and Beeswax (E901).

=== Pet food ===
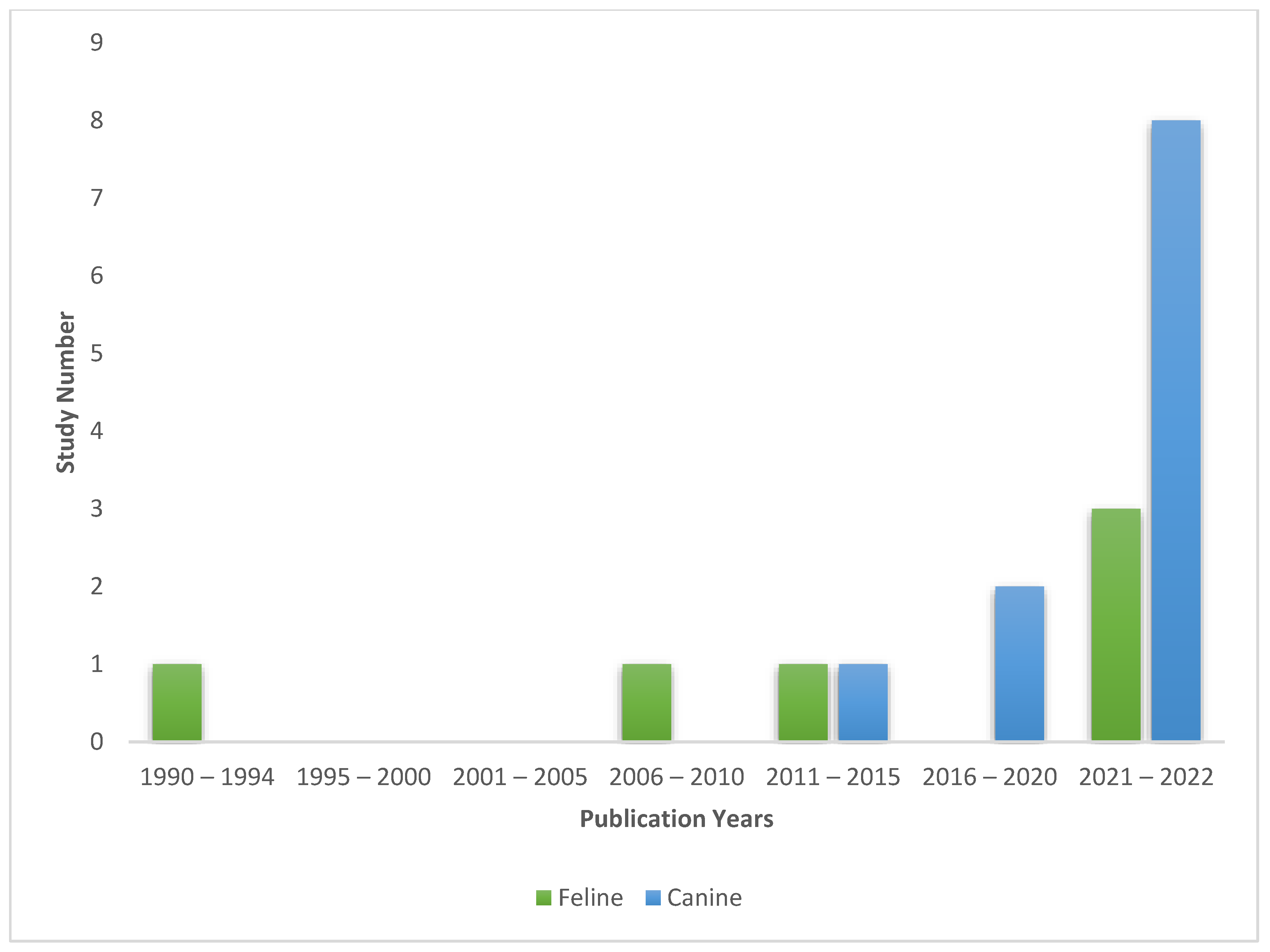
Number and years of publication of studies involving dogs and cats fed vegan diets

Some vegans use plant-derived pet food to feed their pets. Motivation for this can be the impact on food animals and the environmental impact of meat-based pet food. This is particularly true for domesticated cats and dogs, for which vegan pet food is available.

This practice has been met with caution and criticism, especially regarding vegan cat diets because, unlike omnivorous dogs, felids are obligate carnivores, which means they need synthetic supplements added to a plant-based diet. There are concerns plant-based pet foods are not meeting nutritional guidelines. This is common among conventional pet foods too, and survey of 29 pet food manufacturers actually found plant-based pet foods to be more likely to be nutritionally sound. A 2023 systematic review found no evidence of considerable effects on health; however, it was pointed out that included studies had potential issues with selection bias, were not long term, or used low sample sizes.

=== Other products and farming practices ===
A concern is the case of medications, which are routinely tested on animals to ensure they are effective and safe, and may also contain animal ingredients, such as lactose, gelatine, or stearates. There may be no alternatives to prescribed medication or these alternatives may be unsuitable, less effective, or have more adverse side effects. Experimentation with laboratory animals is also used for evaluating the safety of vaccines, food additives, cosmetics, household products, workplace chemicals, and many other substances. Vaccines may also be produced using animal products. E.g. most flu vaccines are manufactured using eggs.

Farming of fruits and vegetables may include fertilizing the soil with animal manure – even on organic farms, possibly causing a concern to vegans for ethical or environmental reasons. "Vegan" (or "animal-free") farming uses plant compost only.

== Animal use ==
=== General ===
The Vegan Society opposes the use of animals for any purpose, including food, clothing, toiletries, testing, and places that use animals for entertainment.

=== Horseback riding ===
The Vegan Society opposes horseback riding on the basis that it is unnecessary and exploitative. While they acknowledge that there are ways to minimize cruelty in "breaking" a horse, they believe that the fact that horses need to be broken at all shows that horses do not naturally expect to be ridden. The Vegan Society also points out that in the modern age, horseback riding is a hobby rather than a legitimate means of transportation.

=== Entertainment ===
The Vegan Society advocates against visiting zoos and aquariums on the belief that they exploit animals for entertainment. Some vegans may visit animal sanctuaries as an alternative. Vegans also avoid visiting circuses that have animal performers.

=== Pets ===
Most vegans do not purchase pets, due to an ethical stance against pet ownership, as well as practices such as artificial insemination, separating animals from their offspring, tail docking, and wing clipping, but may adopt or rescue an animal that cannot live independently. Although there is no vegan consensus on adopting exotic animals as companions, The Vegan Review says they should only be adopted from sanctuaries.

== Research and guidance on health effects ==
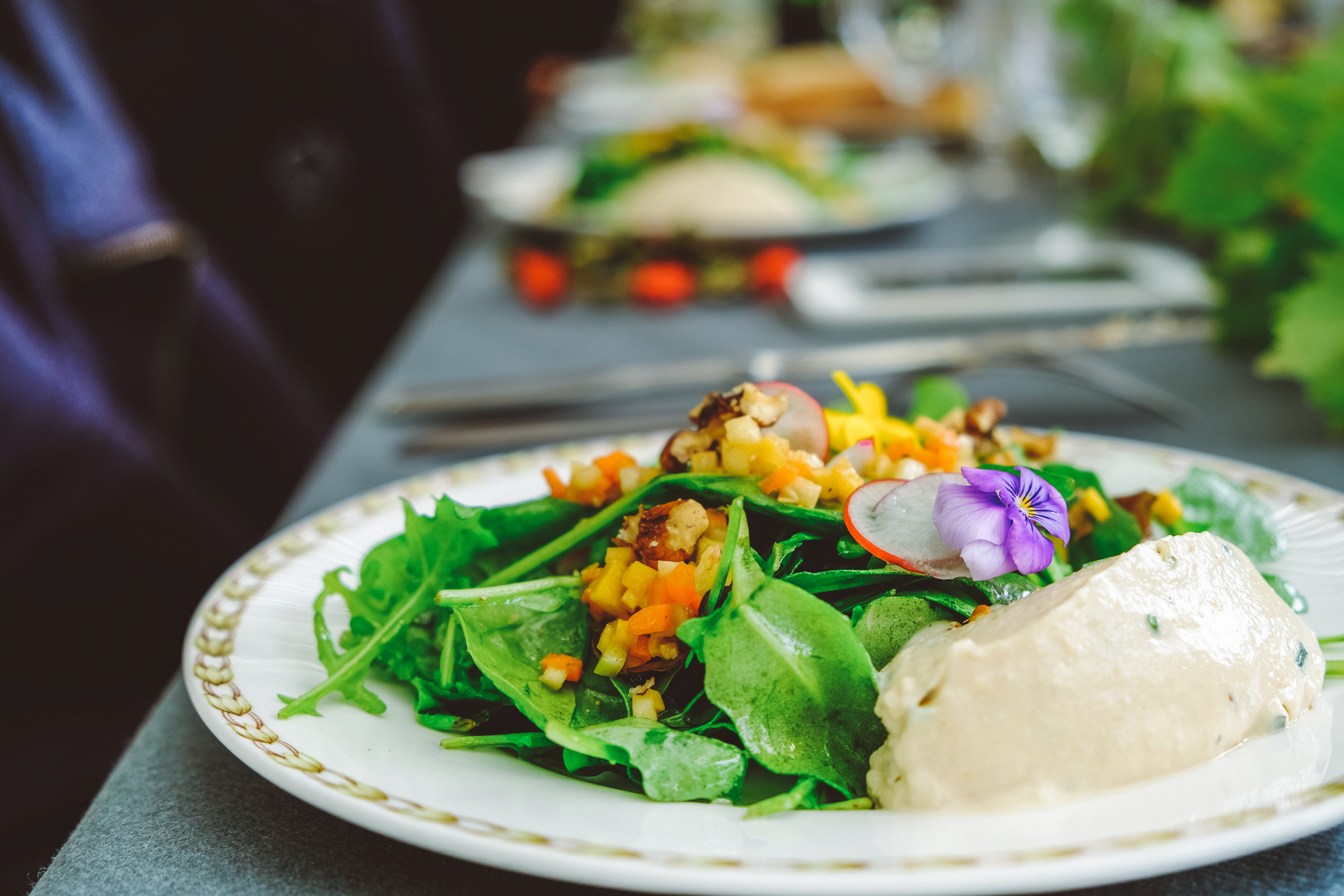
Vegan dish

Conclusions in scientific review articles range from stating benefits, to concluding that evidence is not yet sufficient, to identifying possible health problems. One review reported moderate evidence that adhering to a vegan diet for at least 12 weeks may be effective in individuals with overweight or type 2 diabetes to induce a meaningful decrease in body weight and improve glycemia. A second reported that vegetarian diets, including vegan diets, are associated with lower risk for vascular disease, obesity, dyslipidemia, hypertension, and type 2 diabetes. A third concluded that a vegan diet may be effective for reducing body weight, lowering the risk of cancer, and providing a lower risk of all-cause mortality. People on a vegan diet with diabetes or cardiovascular diseases may have lower levels of disease biomarkers.

A Cochrane review of randomized controlled trials found that there is "currently insufficient information to draw conclusions about the effects of vegan dietary interventions on cardiovascular disease risk factors". There is inconsistent evidence for vegan diets providing an effect on metabolic syndrome. A meta-analysis of prospective cohort studies concluded that vegan diets are associated with reduced risk of ischemic heart disease, but no clear association was found for cardiovascular disease and stroke. There is tentative evidence of an association between vegan diets and reduced risk of cancer. Vegans may be at risk of low bone mineral density.

=== Positions of dietetic and government associations ===
Healthy vegan meal composition shown using the food plate method

The Academy of Nutrition and Dietetics and Dietitians of Canada state that properly planned vegetarian or vegan diets are appropriate for all life stages, including pregnancy and lactation. The Australian National Health and Medical Research Council similarly believe a well-planned vegan diet is viable for any age, as does the British Dietetic Association, British National Health Service and the Canadian Pediatric Society.

As of 2024 the German Society for Nutrition (DGE) holds that for healthy adults a vegan diet can be healthful, when B_{12} is supplemented and the diet is well-planned so that critical nutrients are provided. Because data is lacking the DGE does not recommend for or against vegan diets for vulnerable groups like children, young people, elderly and pregnant or breastfeeding women. If individuals in these groups decide for a vegan diet, they are suggested to seek professional advice, as planning the diet in these cases is complex and irreversible consequences cannot be ruled out, when the diet is not well planned. The DGE highlights that a vegan diet is exceptionally environmental friendly and can reduce greenhouse gases by about 70–80%, while having other environmental benefits, too. As of 2022, 45% of government nutritional guidelines discuss vegan meat or milk alternatives, or both.

=== Pregnancy, infants and children ===
The Academy of Nutrition and Dietetics consider well-planned vegetarian and vegan diets "appropriate for all stages of the life cycle, including pregnancy, lactation, infancy, childhood, adolescence, older adulthood, and for athletes." The position of the Canadian Pediatric Society is that "well-planned vegetarian and vegan diets with appropriate attention to specific nutrient components can provide a healthy alternative lifestyle at all stages of fetal, infant, child and adolescent growth. It is recommended that attention should be given to nutrient intake, particularly protein, vitamins B_{12} and D, essential fatty acids, iron, zinc, and calcium."

=== Nutrients and potential deficiencies ===
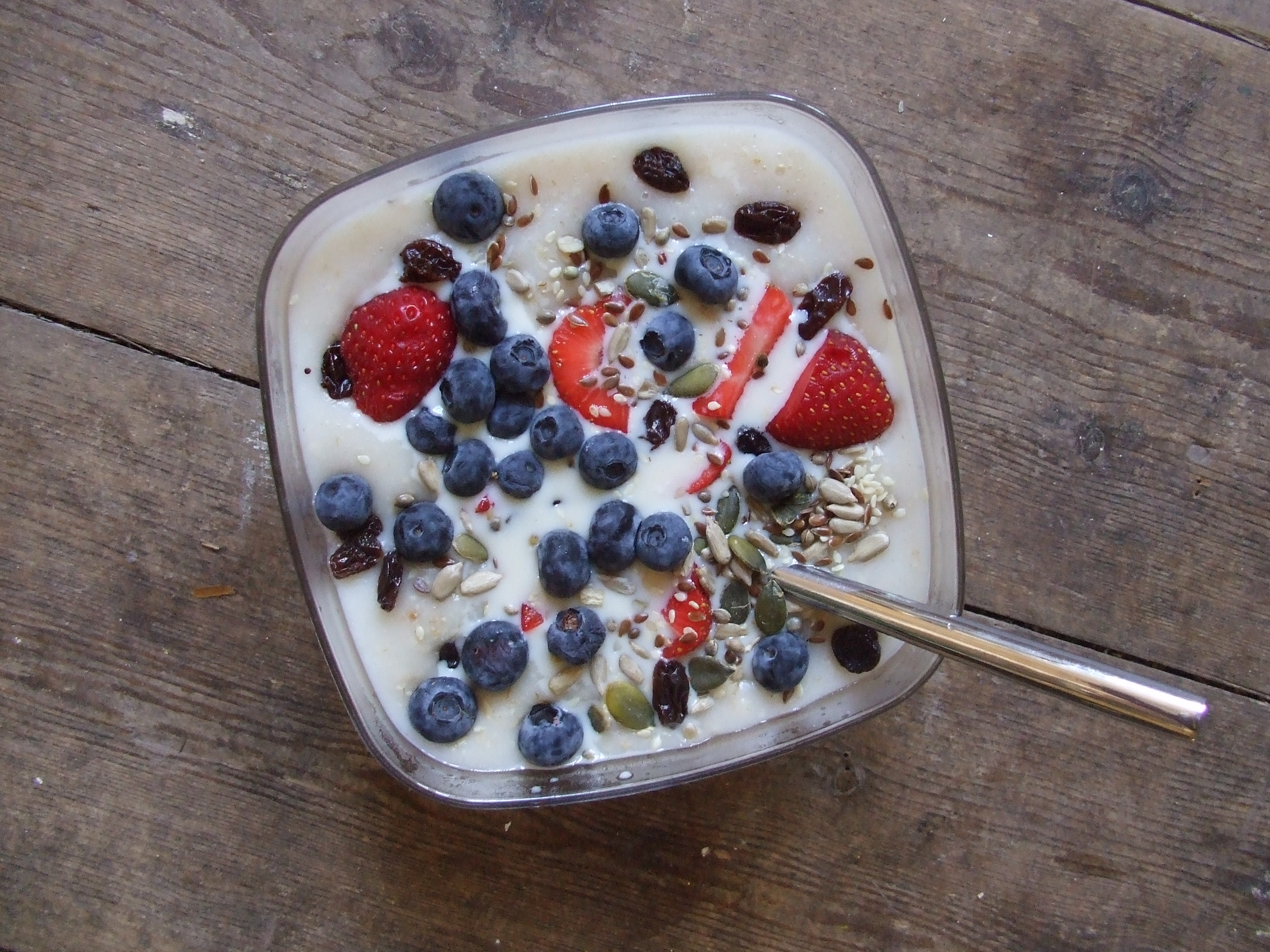
Granola oatmeal with soy milk. Oatmeal is a rich source of manganese and a moderate source of protein, fibre, phosphorus, and zinc.

Vegan diets tend to be higher in dietary fibre, magnesium, folic acid, vitamin C, vitamin E, iron, and phytochemicals, and lower in dietary energy, saturated fat, cholesterol, long chain omega-3 fatty acid, vitamin D, calcium, zinc, and vitamin B_{12}. (Note: Winston J. Craig (The American Journal of Clinical Nutrition, 2009): "Vegan diets are usually higher in dietary fiber, magnesium, folic acid, vitamins C and E, iron, and phytochemicals, and they tend to be lower in calories, saturated fat and cholesterol, long-chain n–3 (omega-3) fatty acids, vitamin D, calcium, zinc, and vitamin B-12. ... A vegan diet appears to be useful for increasing the intake of protective nutrients and phytochemicals and for minimizing the intake of dietary factors implicated in several chronic diseases.") As a result of the elimination of all animal products, a poorly planned vegan diet can lead to nutritional deficiencies that counteract its beneficial effects and cause serious health issues, some of which can only be prevented with fortified foods or dietary supplements.

Vitamin B_{12} supplementation is important because its deficiency can cause blood disorders and potentially irreversible neurological damage; this danger is also one of the most common in poorly planned non-vegan diets. The American Academy of Nutrition and Dietetics states that special attention may be necessary to ensure that a vegan diet provides adequate amounts of vitamin B_{12}, long chain omega-3 fatty acids, vitamin D, calcium, iodine, iron, and zinc. It also states that concern that vegans and vegan athletes may not consume an adequate amount and quality of protein is unsubstantiated.

These nutrients are available in plant foods, with the exception of vitamin B_{12}, which can be obtained only from B_{12}-fortified vegan foods or supplements. Vitamin B_{12} deficiency occurs in up to 80% of all vegans in some Asian countries. Iodine may also require supplementation, such as using iodized salt.

== Philosophy ==
=== Ethical veganism ===
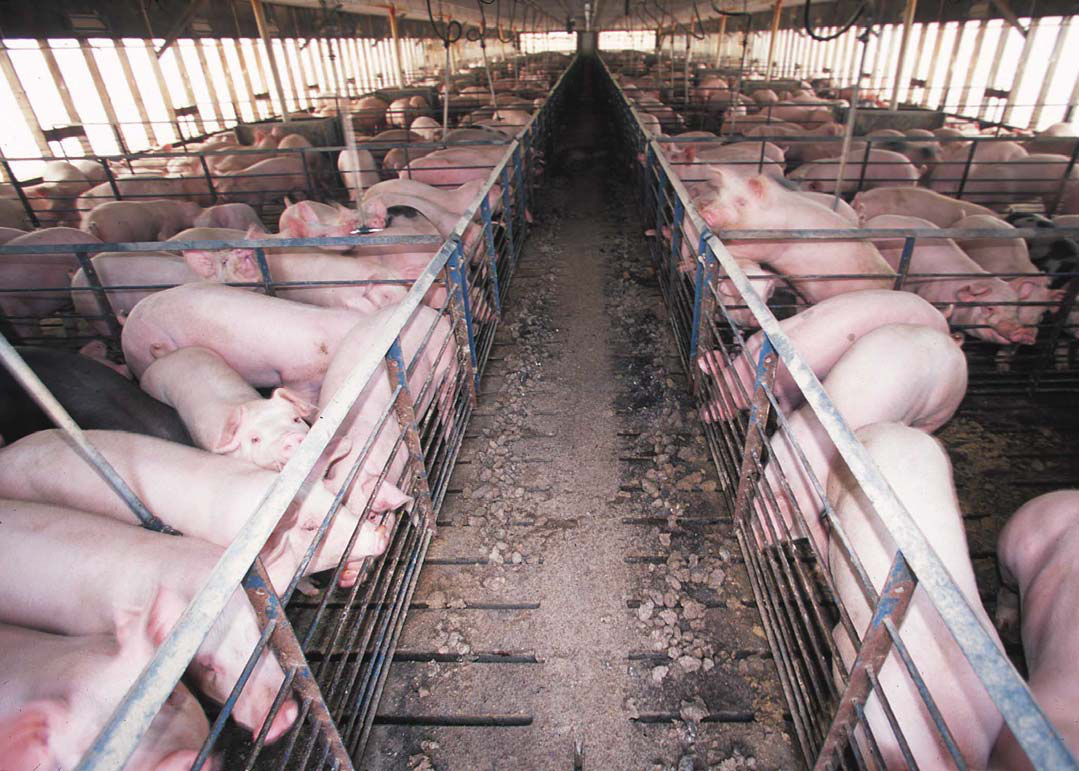
Pigs, as well as chickens and cattle, often have their movement restricted.

Ethical veganism is based on opposition to speciesism, the assignment of value to individuals based on (animal) species membership alone. Divisions within animal rights theory include the utilitarian, protectionist approach, which pursues improved conditions for animals. It also pertains to the rights-based abolitionism, which seeks to end human ownership of non-humans. Abolitionists argue that protectionism serves only to make the public feel that animal use can be morally unproblematic (the "happy meat" position). A common argument used while advocating for ethical veganism is the argument from marginal cases. The argument presents the idea that if negative rights are prescribed to human infants, cognitively and/or physically disabled humans, then by logical extension, animals should also be granted the same negative rights as no morally relevant characteristics exist between animals and marginal-case human beings.

Donald Watson, co-founder of The Vegan Society, has said that "vegetarianism, whilst being a necessary stepping-stone between meat eating and veganism, is only a stepping stone." Of bloodsports, he has said that "to kill creatures for fun must be the very dregs" and that vivisection and animal experimentation "is probably the cruelest of all Man's attack on the rest of Creation."

Alex Hershaft, co-founder of the Farm Animal Rights Movement and Holocaust survivor, says he "was always bothered by the idea of hitting a beautiful, living, innocent animal over the head, cutting him up into pieces, then shoving the pieces into [his] mouth" and that his experiences in the Nazi Holocaust allowed him "to empathize with the conditions of animals in factory farms, auction yards, and slaughterhouses" because he "knows firsthand what it's like to be treated like a worthless object." Several animal rights activists, including Isaac Bashevis Singer, Gary Yourofsky and Karen Davis, have compared the cruel treatment of animals in CAFOs and slaughterhouses to the Holocaust.

Law professor Gary Francione, an abolitionist, argues that all sentient beings should have the right not to be treated as property, and that veganism must be the baseline for anyone who believes that non-humans have intrinsic moral value. (Note: Gary Francione (2009): "We all believe it's wrong to inflict unnecessary suffering and death on animals. ... So now the next question becomes 'what do we mean by necessity?' Well, whatever it means, whatever abstract meaning it has, if it has any meaning whatsoever, its minimal meaning has to be that it's wrong to inflict suffering and death on animals for reasons of pleasure, amusement or convenience ... Problem is 99.9999999 percent of our animal use can only be justified by reasons of pleasure, amusement or convenience.") Philosopher Tom Regan, also a rights theorist, argues that animals possess value as "subjects-of-a-life", because they have beliefs, desires, memory and the ability to initiate action in pursuit of goals. The right of subjects-of-a-life not to be harmed can be overridden by other moral principles, but Regan argues that pleasure, convenience and the economic interests of farmers are not weighty enough. Philosopher Peter Singer, a protectionist and utilitarian, argues that there is no moral or logical justification for failing to count animal suffering as a consequence when making decisions, and that killing animals should be rejected unless necessary for survival. Despite this, he writes that "ethical thinking can be sensitive to circumstances" and that he is "not too concerned about trivial infractions".

An argument by Bruce Friedrich, also a protectionist, holds that strict veganism harms animals because it focuses on personal purity rather than encouraging people to give up whatever animal products they can. For Francione, this is similar to arguing that, because human-rights abuses can never be eliminated, we should not defend human rights in situations we control. By failing to ask a server whether something contains animal products, we reinforce that the moral rights of animals are a matter of convenience, he argues. He concludes from this that the protectionist position fails on its own consequentialist terms.

Philosopher Val Plumwood maintained that ethical veganism is "subtly human-centred", an example of what she called "human/nature dualism", because it views humanity as separate from the rest of nature. Ethical vegans want to admit non-humans into the category that deserves special protection rather than recognize the "ecological embeddedness" of all. Plumwood wrote that animal food may be an "unnecessary evil" from the perspective of the consumer who "draws on the whole planet for nutritional needs"—and she strongly opposed factory farming—but for anyone relying on a much smaller ecosystem, it is very difficult or impossible to be vegan.

Bioethicist Ben Mepham, in his review of Francione and Garner's book The Animal Rights Debate: Abolition or Regulation?, concludes, "if the aim of ethics is to choose the right, or best, course of action in specific circumstances 'all things considered', it is arguable that adherence to such an absolutist agenda is simplistic and open to serious self-contradictions. Or, as Farlie puts it, with characteristic panache: 'to conclude that veganism is the "only ethical response" is to take a big leap into a very muddy pond'." He cites as examples the adverse effects on animal wildlife derived from the agricultural practices necessary to sustain most vegan diets and the ethical contradiction of favoring the welfare of domesticated animals but not that of wild animals; the imbalance between the resources that are used to promote the welfare of animals as opposed to those destined to alleviate the suffering of the approximately one billion human beings who undergo malnutrition, abuse and exploitation; the focus on attitudes and conditions in Western developed countries, leaving out the rights and interests of societies whose economy, culture and, in some cases, survival rely on a symbiotic relationship with animals.

David Pearce, a transhumanist philosopher, has argued that humanity has a "hedonistic imperative" not merely to avoid cruelty to animals caused by humans but also to redesign the global ecosystem such that wild animal suffering in nature ceases to exist. In pursuit of abolishing suffering, Pearce promotes predation elimination among animals and the "cross-species global analogue of the welfare state". Fertility regulation could maintain herbivore populations at sustainable levels, "a more civilised and compassionate policy option than famine, predation, and disease". The increasing number of vegans and vegetarians in the transhumanism movement has been attributed in part to Pearce's influence.

A growing political philosophy that incorporates veganism as part of its revolutionary praxis is veganarchism, which seeks "total abolition" or "total liberation" for all animals, including humans. Veganarchists identify the state as unnecessary and harmful to animals, both human and non-human, and advocate for the adoption of veganism in a stateless society. The term was popularized in 1995 by Brian A. Dominick's pamphlet Animal Liberation and Social Revolution, described as "a vegan perspective on anarchism or an anarchist perspective on veganism".

Direct action is a common practice among veganarchists (and anarchists generally) with groups like the Animal Liberation Front (ALF), the Animal Rights Militia (ARM), the Justice Department (JD) and Revolutionary Cells – Animal Liberation Brigade (RCALB) often engaging in such activities, sometimes criminally, to further their goals. Steven Best, animal rights activist and professor of philosophy at the University of Texas at El Paso, advocates this approach, and has been critical of vegan activists like Francione for supporting animal liberation but not total liberation, which would include not only opposition to "the property status of animals" but also "a serious critique of capitalism, the state, property relations, and commodification dynamics in general." In particular, he criticizes the focus on the simplistic and apolitical "Go Vegan" message directed mainly at wealthy Western audiences, while ignoring people of colour, the working class and the poor, especially in the developing world, stating that "for every person who becomes vegan, a thousand flesh eaters arise in China, India and Indonesia." The "faith in the singular efficacy of conjectural education and moral persuasion," Best writes, is no substitute for "direct action, mass confrontation, civil disobedience, alliance politics, and struggle for radical change." Donald Watson has said he "respects the people enormously who do it, believing that it's the most direct and quick way to achieve their ends." Sociologist David Nibert of Wittenberg University posits that any movement towards global justice would necessitate not only the abolition of animal exploitation, particularly as a food source for humans, but also transitioning towards a socioeconomic alternative to the capitalist system, both of which dovetail into what he calls the animal–industrial complex.

Some vegans also embrace the philosophy of anti-natalism, as they see the two as complementary in terms of "harm reduction" to animals and the environment.

Vegan social psychologist Melanie Joy described the ideology in which people support the use and consumption of animal products as carnism, as a sort of opposite to veganism.

==== Exploitation concerns ====
The Vegan Society has written, "by extension, [veganism] promotes the development and use of animal-free alternatives for the benefit of humans." Many ethical vegans and vegan organizations cite the poor working conditions of slaughterhouse workers as a reason to reject animal products. The first vegan activist, Donald Watson, has asked, "If these butchers and vivisectors weren't there, could we perform the acts that they are doing? And, if we couldn't, we have no right to expect them to do it on our behalf. Full stop! That simply compounds the issue. It means that we're not just exploiting animals; we're exploiting human beings."

=== Environmental veganism ===
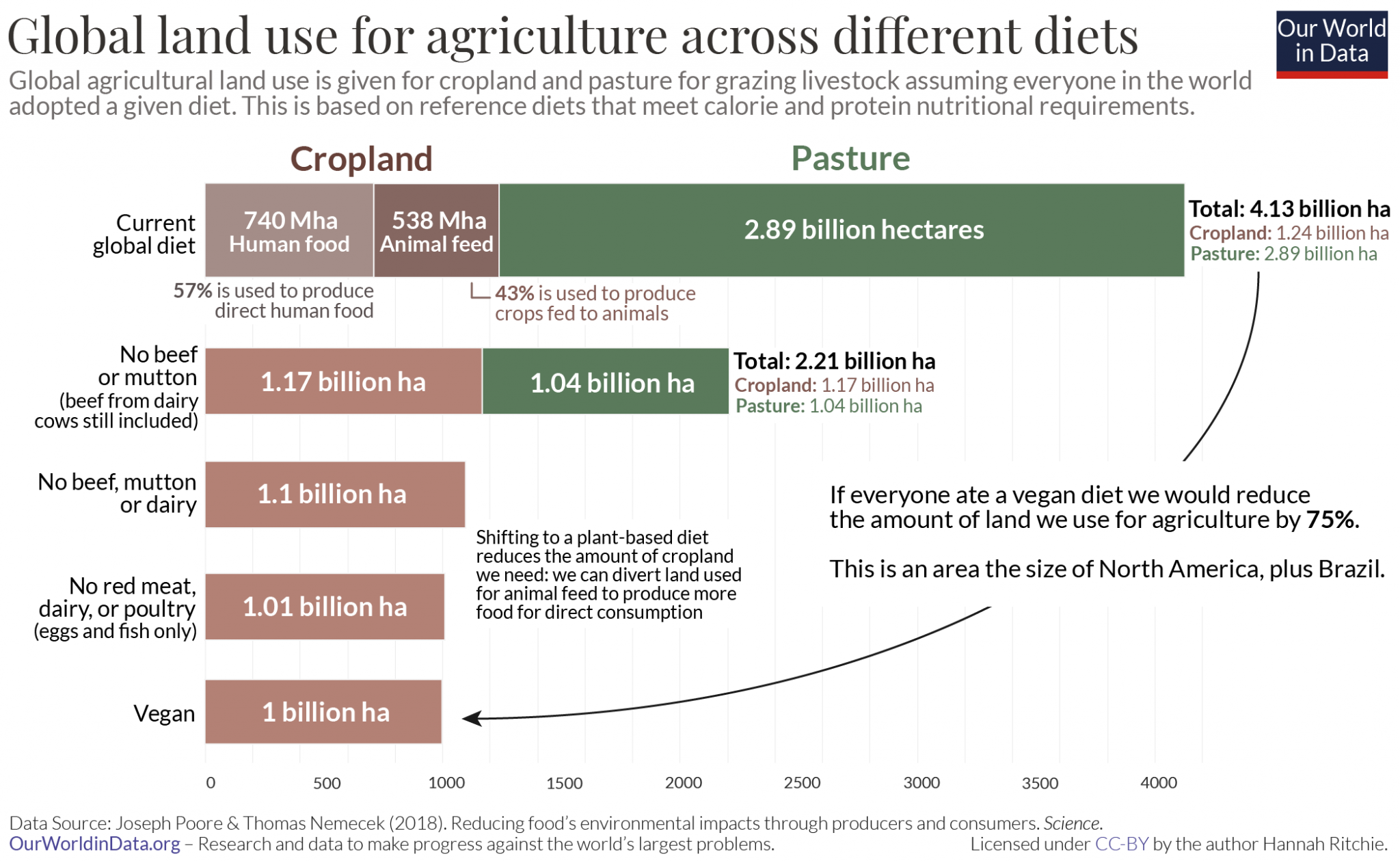
The amount of globally needed agricultural land would be reduced by three-quarters if the entire population adopted a vegan diet.

Environmental vegans focus on conservation, rejecting the use of animal products on the premise that fishing, hunting, trapping and farming, particularly factory farming, are environmentally unsustainable. According to a 2006 United Nations Food and Agriculture Organization report, Livestock's Long Shadow, around 26% of the planet's terrestrial surface is devoted to livestock grazing. The report also concluded that livestock farming (mostly of cows, chickens and pigs) affects the air, land, soil, water, biodiversity and climate change. Livestock consumed 1,174 million tonnes of food in 2002—including 7.6 million tonnes of fishmeal and 670 million tonnes of cereals, one-third of the global cereal harvest. Paul Watson of the Sea Shepherd Conservation Society called pigs and chicken "major aquatic predators", because livestock eat 40 percent of the fish that are caught. A 2010 UN report, Assessing the Environmental Impacts of Consumption and Production, argued that animal products "in general require more resources and cause higher emissions than plant-based alternatives". It proposed a move away from animal products to reduce environmental damage. (Note: United Nations Environment Programme (2010): "Impacts from agriculture are expected to increase substantially due to population growth, increasing consumption of animal products. Unlike fossil fuels, it is difficult to look for alternatives: people have to eat. A substantial reduction of impacts would only be possible with a substantial worldwide diet change, away from animal products.")

Reduction of one person's carbon footprint for various actions. A plant-based diet in this study referred to a lacto-ovo vegetarian diet. A vegan diet would be given a value of about 1 on this graph.

A 2015 study determined that significant biodiversity loss can be attributed to the growing demand for meat, a significant driver of deforestation and habitat destruction, with species-rich habitats converted to agriculture for livestock production. A 2017 World Wildlife Fund study found that 60% of biodiversity loss can be attributed to the vast scale of feed crop cultivation needed to rear tens of billions of farm animals, which puts enormous strain on natural resources, resulting in extensive loss of lands and species. In 2017, 15,364 world scientists signed a warning to humanity calling for, among other things, "promoting dietary shifts towards mostly plant-based foods".

A 2018 study found that global adoption of plant-exclusive diets would reduce agricultural land use by 76% (3.1 billion hectares, an area the size of Africa) and cut total global greenhouse gas emissions by 28%. Half of this emissions reduction came from avoided emissions from animal production including methane and nitrous oxide, and half from trees re-growing on abandoned farmlands that remove carbon dioxide from the air. The authors conclude that avoiding meat and dairy is the "single biggest way" to reduce one's impact on Earth.

The 2019 IPBES Global Assessment Report on Biodiversity and Ecosystem Services found that industrial agriculture and overfishing are the primary drivers of the extinction crisis, with the meat and dairy industries having a substantial impact. On 8 August 2019, the IPCC released a summary of the 2019 special report which asserted that a shift towards plant-exclusive diets would help to mitigate and adapt to climate change.

A 2022 study found that for high-income nations alone 100 billion tons of carbon dioxide could be removed from the air by the end of the century through a shift to plant-exclusive diets and re-wilding of farmlands. The researchers coined the term double climate dividend to describe the effect that re-wilding after a diet shift can have. But they note: "We don't have to be purist about this, even just cutting animal intake would be helpful. If half of the public in richer regions cut half the animal products in their diets, you're still talking about a massive opportunity in environmental outcomes and public health".

A 2023 study published in Nature Food found that a vegan diet vastly decreases the impact on the environment from food production, such as reducing emissions, water pollution and land use by 75%, reducing the destruction of wildlife by 66% and the usage of water by 54%.

=== Dietary veganism ===
Some people follow a vegan diet but not other aspects of veganism. Dietary veganism is limited to following a plant-exclusive diet. Dietary veganism is in contrast to ethical veganism which is defined as a philosophical belief that is a protected characteristic under the UK's Equality Act 2010. Authors like Richard Twine and Breeze Harper argue that dietary veganism cannot be called veganism, as veganism is more than a diet. Gary L. Francione has argued that the promotion of "dietary veganism" lacks the moral imperative expressed by Leslie J. Cross, an early and influential vice-president of The Vegan Society, who said in 1949 that veganism was "the abolition of the exploitation of animals by man".

The Vegan Society of Canada have criticized dietary veganism stating, "since veganism is not a list of ingredients there is also no such thing as a dietary vegan. Veganism cannot be split into sub-components; this is a case where the whole is greater than the sum of its parts". Others have suggested that the arguments for dietary veganism can be extended to support ethical veganism.

=== Feminist veganism ===
==== Pioneers ====
One leading activist and scholar of feminist animal rights is Carol J. Adams. Her premier work, The Sexual Politics of Meat: A Feminist-Vegetarian Critical Theory (1990), noted the relationship between feminism and meat consumption. Since its release, Adams has published several other works, including essays, books, and keynote addresses. In one of her speeches, "Why feminist-vegan now?"—adapted from her original address at the "Minding Animals" conference in Newcastle, Australia (2009)—she said, "the idea that there was a connection between feminism and vegetarianism came to [her] in October 1974". Other authors have echoed Adams's ideas and expanded on them. Feminist scholar Angella Duvnjak wrote in "Joining the Dots: Some Reflections on Feminist-Vegan Political Practice and Choice" (2011) that she was met with opposition when she pointed out the connection between feminist and vegan ideals, even though the connection seemed more than obvious to her and other scholars.

==== Animal and human abuse parallels ====
One of the central concepts that animates feminist veganism is the idea that there is a connection between the oppression of women and the oppression of animals. For example, Marjorie Spiegal compared the consumption or servitude of animals for human gain to slavery. This connection is further mirrored by feminist vegan writers like Carrie Hamilton, who wrote that violent "rapists sometimes exhibit behavior that seems to be patterned on the mutilation of animals", suggesting there is a parallel between rape and animal cruelty.

==== Capitalism and feminist veganism ====
Feminist veganism also relates to feminist thought through the common critique of the capitalist means of production. In an interview, Carol J. Adams highlighted "meat eating as the ultimate capitalist product, because it takes so much to make the product, it uses up so many resources". This extensive use of resources for meat production is discouraged in favor of using that productive capacity for other food products that have a less detrimental impact on the environment.

=== Religious veganism ===
Streams within a number of religious traditions encourage veganism, sometimes on ethical or environmental grounds. Scholars have especially noted the growth in the 21st century of Jewish veganism, as well as Jain veganism. Some religious interpretations, such as Christian vegetarianism, Hindu vegetarianism, and Buddhist vegetarianism, also recommend or mandate a vegan diet. Donald Watson argued,

If Jesus were alive today, he'd be an itinerant vegan propagandist instead of an itinerant preacher of those days, spreading the message of compassion, which, as I see it, is the only useful part of what religion has to offer and, sad as it seems, I doubt if we have to enroll our priest as a member of the Vegan Society.

=== Black veganism ===
In the U.S., Black veganism is a social and political philosophy as well as a diet. It connects the use of nonhuman animals with other social justice concerns such as racism, and with the lasting effects of slavery, such as the subsistence diets of enslaved people enduring as familial and cultural food traditions. Dietary changes caused by the Great Migration also meant former farmers, who had previously been able to grow or forage vegetables, became reliant on processed foods.

According to Oakland activist AshEL Eldridge, the movement is about the Black community reclaiming its food sovereignty and "decolonizing" Black Americans' diet. According to Shah, the area where most vegans of colour feel the greatest rift with mainstream veganism is in its failure to recognize the intersectionality with other social justice issues, such as food access.

== Politics and activism ==
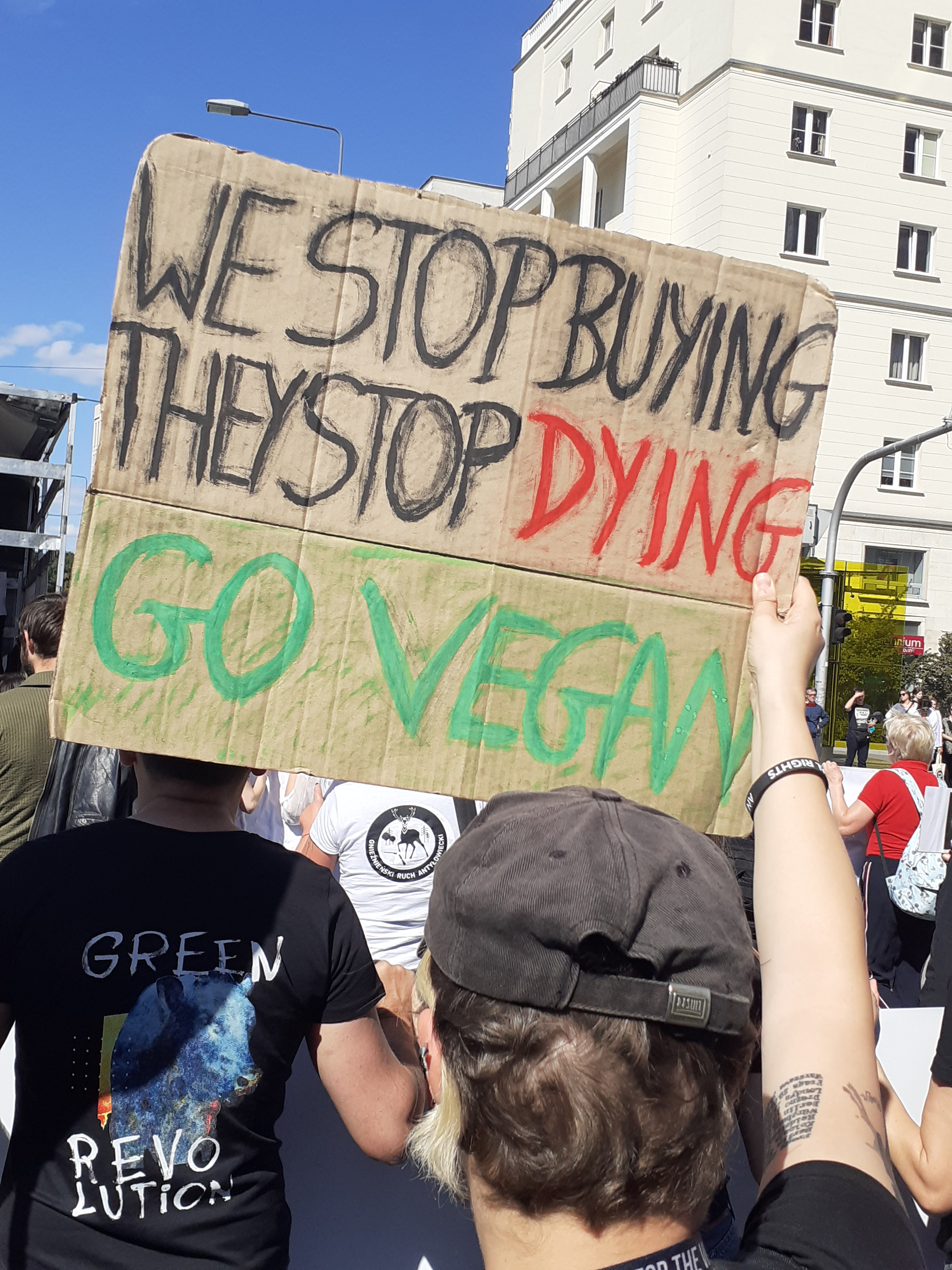
Participant of the Animal Liberation March in Warsaw encouraging veganism, 2022

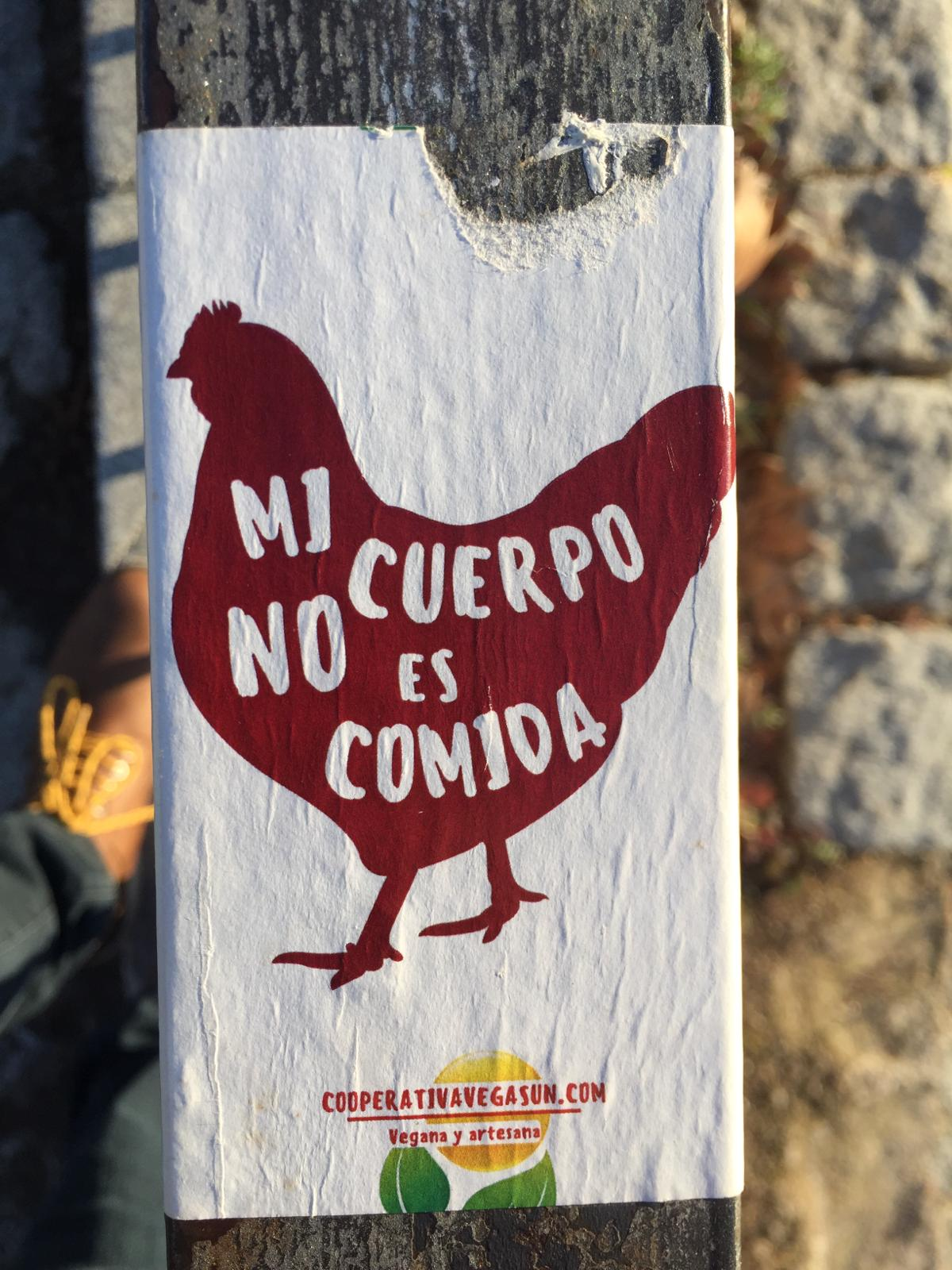
Vegan activism sticker in Madrid: My body is not food

In 2021, vegan climate activist Greta Thunberg called for more vegan food production and consumption worldwide. Political parties such as Tierschutzpartei in Germany and PACMA in Spain have pro-vegan agendas. They cooperate via Animal Politics EU. In the European Union, meat producers and vegans debate whether vegan food products should be allowed to use terms like "sausages" or "burgers". The EU bans labeling vegan products with dairy-related words like "almond milk", a rule instated in 2017. As of 2019, six countries in Europe apply higher value-added tax (VAT) rates to vegan plant milk than to cow milk, which pro-vegan activists have called discrimination.

== Demographics ==
One out of 10 Americans over 18 consider themselves vegan or vegetarian as of January 2022. A study comparing personality traits of vegans, vegetarians and carnists found that vegans were higher in openness and agreeableness than carnists.

== Prejudice against vegans ==
Vegaphobia, vegephobia, veganphobia, or veganophobia is an aversion to, or dislike of, vegetarians and vegans. The term first appeared in the 2010s, coinciding with the rise in veganism in the late 2010s. Several studies have found an incidence of vegaphobic sentiments in the general population. Positive feelings regarding vegetarians and vegans also exist. Because of their diet, others may perceive them as more virtuous or principled.

== Rights ==
In some countries, vegans have some rights to meals and legal protections against discrimination.

- In the United Kingdom, an employment tribunal ruled in 2020 that the Equality Act 2010 protects "ethical veganism", a belief it defined as veganism that extends beyond diet to all areas of life and is motivated by a concern for animals. For example, prisoners who are vegan must be given a vegan meal with enough nutrients to sustain a healthy life and should also be given appropriate clothing, toiletries etc., and not expected to do work violating their vegan beliefs.
- In Portugal, starting in 2017, public administration canteens and cafeterias such as schools, prisons and social services must offer at least one vegan option at every meal.
- In Ontario, a province of Canada, veganism was ruled to not be a protected belief in 2023. This follows earlier analyses that ethical veganism became protected under the Ontario Human Rights Code, following a 2015 update to legal guidance by the Ontario Human Rights Commission. The earlier position was guidance and for a judge or tribunal to decide on a case-by-case basis.
- The German police sometimes provides on-duty staff with food. After not being provided a vegan option in this context, a vegan employee has been granted an additional food allowance.

== Symbols ==
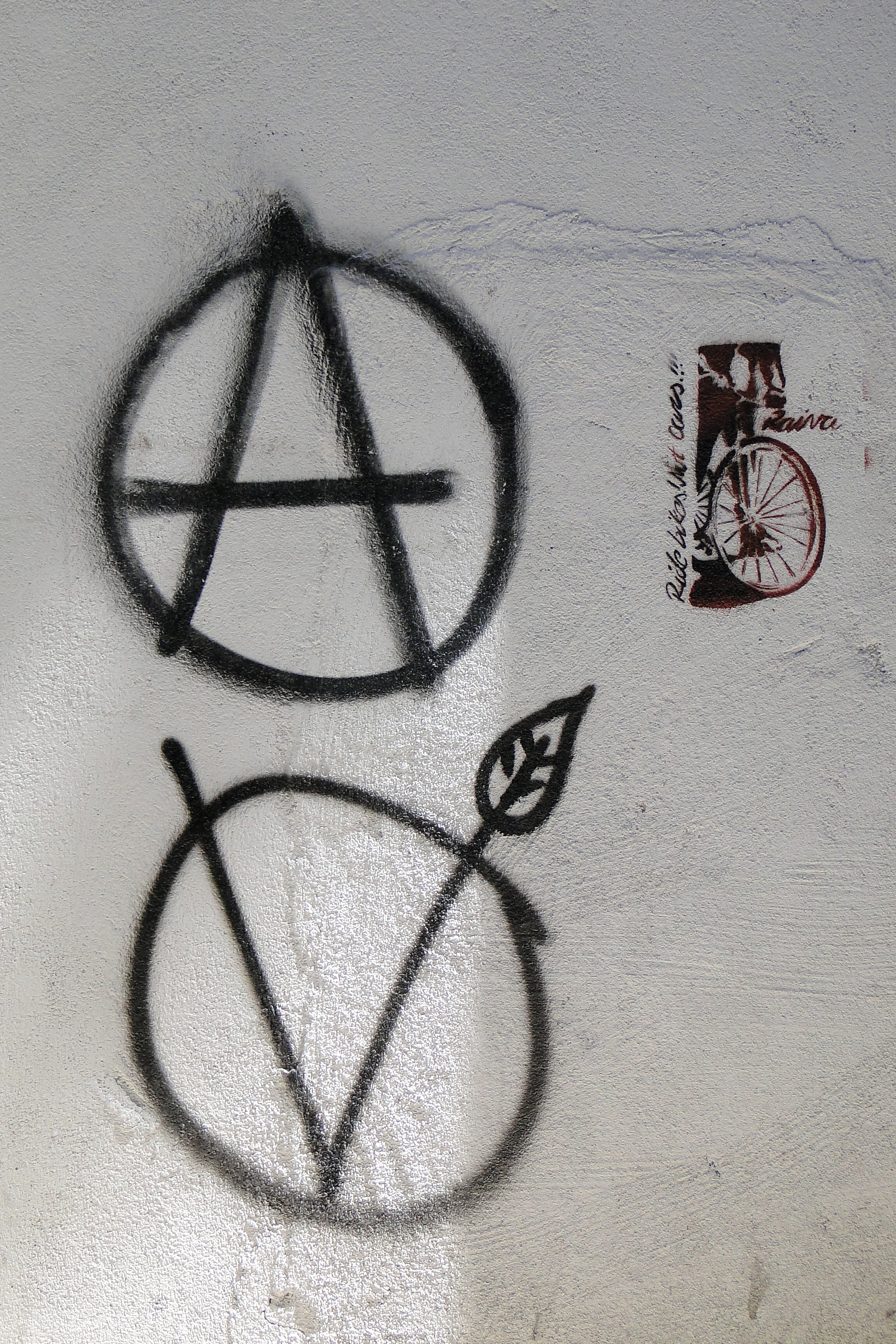
Vegan graffiti showing an enclosed V below a circle A in Lisbon, Portugal

Multiple symbols have been developed to represent veganism. Several are used on consumer packaging, including the Vegan Society trademark and the Vegan Action logo, to indicate products without animal-derived ingredients. Various symbols may also be used by members of the vegan community to represent their identity and in the course of animal rights activism, such as a vegan flag.

== Media depictions ==
Veganism is often misrepresented in media. Some argue that veganism has been dismissed in news media, or that clickbait culture often portrays feminists and vegans as "irrational extremists". This is because in Western societies meat-based diets are the norm", with those who avoid meat still representing "a small minority", more women than men as vegan and vegetarian, and women being "under-represented in the mass media", the latter influencing more to be vegetarians. Others have noted those who are vegetarian and vegan are met with "acceptance, tolerance, or hostility" after they divulge they are vegetarian or vegan. There are a number of vegan stereotypes, including claims they hate carnists, are always hungry, weak, angry, or moralistic. The hatred of vegans has been termed as vegaphobia by some individuals. In 2019, Farhad Manjoo stated that "preachy vegans are something of a myth" and argued that in pop culture, and generally, it is "still widely acceptable to make fun of vegans."

=== Literature ===
Often vegan or vegetarian characters are portrayed as fringe characters, although other novels cast them as protagonists or encourage people to become vegetarians or vegans. Some have argued that there are more vegan cookbooks than "vegan literature". There are also books that introduce "vegan identity to children", or encourage people to "write for" animals. Bruce Banner in Ultimate Wolverine vs. Hulk, as well as Karolina Dean in Runaways, who is also known as Lucy in the Sky or L.S.D., are vegans. The latter is a lesbian, a vegan, and "an ardent animal lover ... committed to a life completely free of meat and dairy."

=== TV shows ===
Jessica Cruz / Green Lantern, a lead character in the animated series DC Super Hero Girls, is not only pacifist but also a vegan and environmentalist, resulting in her becoming friends with Pam Isley. She often professes her commitment to the environment and plant-exclusive meals.

The series City of Ghosts featured a chef, Sonya, who runs a vegan cafe in Leimert Park, Los Angeles. Draculaura in Monster High has also been called "one of the very few outspoken vegan cartoon characters out there".

=== Social media ===
By the 2010s, social media sites like Instagram became prominent in the promotion of veganism, more than a fad, with people trying to "change the world by being vegan" as stated by various media outlets.

== Economics ==
The U.S. market for vegan food was valued at $3.9 billion in 2017 and at $8.1 billion in 2023. In 2025, U.S. retail sales of plant-based foods totaled approximately $7.9 billion. Plant-based milk was the largest category, with $2.7 billion in sales, accounting for more than one-third of the plant-based food market and about 13% of total retail milk dollar sales. Plant-based milk also had the highest household penetration among the major plant-based categories, with 38% of U.S. households purchasing it during the year. Plant-based meat and seafood was the second-largest category, with approximately $1.0 billion in retail sales. Within the plant-based milk category, almond milk accounted for 49% of U.S. unit sales in 2025, followed by oat milk at 21%, soy milk at 8%, and coconut milk at 7%.

=== Vegan veto vote ===
The vegan veto vote happens when a mixed group of non-vegan and vegans dine out together and the vegans in the group veto restaurants with few vegan options and steer the group to a restaurant with many vegan menu items. Restaurants report that adding more vegan items increases their business. Journalist Avery Yale Kamila reported that Maine restaurants were using the vegan veto vote to fill restaurant seats in the slow winter months. The vegan veto vote has been recognized by market researchers since 2007. Industry magazine QSR reported: "As customers demand more complex menus, healthier options, and increased convenience, brands have to work harder to eliminate possible veto votes." The Vegetarian Resource Group reported in 2003 that 50 restaurant owners at that year's National Restaurant Association Show mentioned the vegan veto vote affecting their businesses.

=== Potential economic impact ===
According to a 2016 study, if everyone in the U.S. switched to a vegan diet, the country would save $208.2 billion in direct health-care savings, $40.5 billion in indirect health-care savings, $40.5 billion in environmental savings, and $289.1 billion in total savings by 2050. The study also found that if everybody in the world switched to a vegan diet, the global economy would save $684.4 billion in direct health-care savings, $382.6 billion in indirect health-care savings, $569.5 billion in environmental savings, and $1.63 trillion in total savings by 2050.

== See also ==
- Ahimsa
  - Ahimsa in Jainism
  - Diet in Hinduism
- al-Ma'arri
- Animal rights movement
  - Abolitionist veganism
  - List of animal rights advocates
- Bibliography of veganism and vegetarianism
- Buddhist ethics
  - Buddhist cuisine and vegetarianism
  - Engaged Buddhism
  - Sentient beings
- Carnism
- History of vegetarianism
- List of diets
- List of vegan media
- List of vegetarian and vegan organizations
- Organic food
- Raw veganism
- Sustainable food system
- Vegan nutrition
- Vegan school meal
- Vegetarian and vegan symbolism
- Women and vegetarianism and veganism advocacy

== Bibliography ==
- Monbiot, George (2022). Regenesis: Feeding the World without Devouring the Planet. London. Penguin Books. ISBN 978-0143135968.
- Williams, Howard (2019). The Ethics of Diet: A Catena of Authorities Deprecatory of the Practice of Flesh Eating. Czechia. Good Press. ISBN 978-9389614305.
