= The Vegan Society =

British charity

- Founded: November 1944; 81 years ago
- Founders: Donald Watson; Elsie Shrigley; Fay Keeling Henderson; George Allan Henderson
- Type: Charity
- Location: Birmingham
- Region served: International
- Method: Information, support, campaigns
- Members: 7,727 in 2022
- CEO: Libby Peppiatt
- Main organ: The Vegan
- Employees: 68 full-time equivalents in 2022
- Volunteers: 40
- Website: vegansociety.com

Vegan Trademark for the labelling of vegan products
- The Vegan Trademark is a registered trademark that registers products as vegan.
- Effective since: 27 February 1990
- Legal status: Recognised by consumers

The Vegan Society is a registered charity and the oldest vegan organization in the world, founded in the United Kingdom in 1944 by Donald Watson, Elsie Shrigley, George Henderson and his wife Fay Henderson among others.

== History ==
In November 1944, Donald Watson, secretary of the Leicester Vegetarian Society, who identified as a non-dairy vegetarian, started a newsletter called The Vegan News, sub-titled "Quarterly Magazine of the Non-Dairy Vegetarians". Watson coined the term vegan to describe a vegetarian diet devoid of all animal-derived ingredients such as dairy and eggs. He derived the term from the word vegetarian by taking its first three letters and its last two letters because "veganism starts with vegetarianism and carries it through to its logical conclusion". However, Watson credited founding members G. A. Henderson and his wife Fay K. Henderson as originating the idea of the word vegan as they had suggested the name 'Allvega' with 'Allvegan' to be used as the title of his magazine. It was from this that the term vegan was taken by Watson.

Watson had given a talk to the Vegetarian Society on the use of dairy products in December 1943 and a summary was published in their journal, The Vegetarian Messenger in March 1944. A few months later Watson and Shrigley requested to form a sub-group of non-dairy vegetarians within the Vegetarian Society. There were arguments from vegetarians against the formation of a non-dairy group within its organization. It was considered but its trustees felt that its inclusion might not be comfortable for its vegetarian membership and it was suggested that the non-dairy vegetarians should form their own society.

In November 1944 a meeting on the formation of The Vegan Society was held at the Attic Club, 144 High Holborn in London. Those who attended were Donald Watson, Elsie Shrigley, Fay K. Henderson, Alfred Hy Haffenden, Paul Spencer and Bernard Drake, with Barbara Moore observing. (Note: George Allan Henderson was not present at the meeting.) According to Shrigley, the day of the founding meeting was "a Sunday, with sunshine and a blue sky – an auspicious day for the birth of an idealistic movement". During the same month, The Vegan Society published their manifesto with two aims:

1. To advocate that man's food should be derived from fruits, nuts, vegetables, grains and other wholesome non-animal products and that it should exclude flesh, fish, fowl, eggs, honey, and animal's milk, butter, and cheese.

2. To encourage the manufacture and use of alternatives to animal commodities.

When The Vegan Society was being formed, Watson's newsletter was sent to 500 readers, and its successor, The Vegan first published in 1946, ran to a thousand copies. Watson was editor of The Vegan. In 1946, he became first president of The Vegan Society. Other presidents were William Collier in 1947, Frank Mayo in 1949 and Elsie Shrigley in 1951. In the late 1940s and 1950s The Vegan Society was affiliated with the International Vegetarian Union and took part in their international congresses. Despite clashing with the vegetarian movement through misunderstandings in its early years, by the late 1940s The Vegan Society worked in harmony with the Vegetarian Society and other organizations. In 1957, president John Heron lectured on veganism at a meeting in Colwyn Bay sponsored by the North Wales Vegetarian Society.

The London Group of The Vegan Society was formed in 1945. Its secretary was Frank Mitchell (1889–1959) a chemist and Quaker. In 1949, the Yorkshire Group of The Vegan Society held a meeting in Huddersfield. Mrs. M. B. Rawls a speaker at the meeting argued that the production of dairy and eggs were inseparable from cruelty. Eva Batt of The Vegan Society lectured on veganism at Eastbourne Central Library Lecture Hall in 1968. She talked about how plant proteins contain all the essential amino-acids and predicted that plant milks would have a future in the nutritional field.

In 1988, The Vegan Society reported having 4000 members.

=== World Vegan Day ===
The founding of the Society is celebrated annually on 1 November, World Vegan Day. The day was established in 1994 by Louise Wallis, the then chairperson; however, the actual date of founding is thought to have been either 5 or 12 November 1944. In 2011, Wallis said: "We knew the Society had been founded in November 1944 but didn’t know the exact date, so I decided to go for 1 November, partly because I liked the idea of this date coinciding with Samhain/Halloween and the Day of the Dead - traditional times for feasting and celebration, both apt and auspicious."

=== Vegan Eatwell Guide ===
The Vegan Society has produced a Vegan Eatwell Guide adapted from the Public Health England's Eatwell Guide under terms of the Open Government Licence. The guide includes a pictorial representation of a balanced vegan diet emphasising the consumption of fruits, legumes, vegetables and whole grains. It includes the use of fortified foods and supplementation.

== Definition ==
In 1945, Watson and committee members of The Vegan Society defined veganism as "the practice of living on fruits, nuts, vegetables, grains, and other wholesome non-animal products". Writing in 1947, Fay K. Henderson commented that

There has been much conjecture as to the origin of the word VEGAN and its meaning. It is therefore interesting to realise that in the first instance it was an attempt to get beyond the rather negative phrase "non-dairy vegetarian" which was originally applied to the founders of The Vegan Society. The word indicates an all vegetable base and is a restricted form of vegetarian, being both the beginning and the end yet implying hopefully that what starts as vegetarian may finish as vegan.

In 1951, Leslie J. Cross (1911–1979), an animal rights activist and vice-president of The Vegan Society, commented that "The object of the Society shall be to end the exploitation of animals by man"; and 'The word veganism shall mean the doctrine that man should live without exploiting animals". In 1954, Elsie Shrigley stated that the word veganism was "clearly defined". The 1954 definition was "The Society affirms that man has no right to exploit animals, advocates that man's food should be derived from fruits, nuts, vegetables, vegetables and grains, and encourages the use of alternatives to all products of animal origin".

The definition of veganism was amended over the years into an ethical philosophy. In 1965, veganism was defined by the Society as "a way of living which excludes all forms of exploitation of, and cruelty to, the animal kingdom, and includes a reverence and compassion for all life" and described its practice as living on only products from the plant kingdom.

In the 1990s, the Society's membership was using a dietary definition of veganism. In 1996, Richard Farhall of The Vegan Society commented that "there are many definitions of vegan, but for membership of the Society we define it in dietary terms, where a vegan is someone who doesn't eat any animal products including fish, poultry, eggs, animal milks, honey or their derivatives". (Note: Richard Farhall was general secretary of The Vegan Society and editor of The Vegan.)

The Vegan Society currently defines veganism as "a philosophy and way of living which seeks to exclude—as far as is possible and practicable—all forms of exploitation of, and cruelty to, animals for food, clothing or any other purpose; and by extension, promotes the development and use of animal-free alternatives for the benefit of humans, animals and the environment. In dietary terms it denotes the practice of dispensing with all products derived wholly or partly from animals."

== Activities ==
- Information – The Vegan Society provides information on all aspects of vegan living on their website, from their nutritional pages such as Vitamin B12: the key facts to the how and why of going vegan, to lifestyle articles and blogs. Their 30 Day Vegan Pledge has been running since 2008, each day providing a recipe, tips, and advice on going vegan. The Vegan Society also offer tools for activists such as free leaflets and advice on effective outreach.
- Campaigns – The Vegan Society campaigns on multiple issues. Current campaigns involve improving hospital catering and their 'Grow Green' campaign, whereby farmers are incentivized to move from animal farming towards plant protein crops.
- Support – The Vegan Society provides support via its UK network of local contacts as well as a free email-in service.
- Vegan Trademark – the label ensures all products and its derivatives are free from animal ingredients and testing. The Vegan Society defines 'animal' as all vertebrates and invertebrates, meaning its policy does not allow testing on insects, water fleas or any other creature.
- The Vegan – the charity publishes a quarterly magazine sent free to members.
- Since June 2020, The Vegan Society has a podcast, called The Vegan Pod.

== Controversies ==
=== Animal Liberation Front ===
In 1992, Arthur Ling, the then vice-president of The Vegan Society, argued that the Animal Liberation Front (ALF) had tried to infiltrate the Society and had started a smear campaign against him by falsely accusing him of animal cruelty. Ling stated that ALF had published leaflets about him and spread rumours that he had been sacked as president of the Society for killing mice in his factory. Ling who chaired many of the Society's annual general meetings claimed that there was an anonymous letter circulating from ALF requesting specific members to be voted onto the council and there was an uproar when he requested instead for a postal vote. During this time, the only elected council member involved with ALF was Robin Webb, their press officer who denied all allegations. Richard Farhall general secretary of the Society confirmed that anonymous letters had been sent to members but there was no reference to ALF. Ling's son Adrian told the Society's council that he had used mouse poison in his father's factory but his father had not been involved.

Ling was not sacked as president; he was voted out at election in 1991. In 1992, Ling stated "at a time when higher proportion of the British public is turning to vegetarianism and veganism, the Society cannot afford to be seen as an ALF front".

=== Eshe Kiama Zuri ===
In 2021, complaints were made against Eshe Kiama Zuri, former vice-chairperson of The Vegan Society, who made a series of controversial posts deemed offensive and racist on social media. In response, Zuri accused other members of The Vegan Society of being racist. Zuri, who describes themself as disabled and non-gendered, argued that although veganism was coined by a white man it had been built on indigenous and non-western ancestral traditions in Africa and Asia. They argued that this was not being acknowledged by its members, and that they had been "forced out" of the Society by a smear campaign.

The Vegan Society commissioned Ijeoma Omambala, QC, to investigate such claims. Omanbala in her report found that the complainants did not present any evidence to support the alleged claims of racism but that some of Zuri's posts had been unprofessional and inappropriate and noted that Zuri had been misgendered in meetings at the Society. Zuri and four other trustees resigned prior to the completion of mediation. The Vegan Society have published a summary of Omambala's report on their website and have released a public statement claiming "as with many charities, The Vegan Society has a number of challenges that we must address as we evolve into an even more diverse and inclusive organisation."

== Movement for Compassionate Living ==
A breakaway group from The Vegan Society, the Movement for Compassionate Living, was founded in 1984 by the former Vegan Society secretary Kathleen Jannaway and her husband Jack.

== Presidents ==
Presidents existed up until 1993:

Presidents (1946–1993)
1946–1947	Donald Watson
1947–1949	William Collier
1949–1950	Frank Mayo
1951–1956, 1960–1963	Elsie Shrigley
1956–1960	John Heron
1964–1978	Frey Ellis
1978–1983	Jack Sanderson
1984–1987	Serena Coles
1987–1991	Arthur Ling
1992–1993	Louise Wallis

== See also ==
- European Vegetarian Union
- List of vegetarian and vegan organizations
- List of animal rights groups
- List of vegan and plant-based media
