= Elsie Shrigley =

English activist (1899–1978)

- Portrait of Shrigley
- Born: Elsie Beatrice Salling; 30 October 1899; North London, England
- Died: 13 May 1978 (aged 78); Tonbridge, Kent, England
- Other name: Sally Shrigley
- Occupations: Activist for vegetarianism and veganism
- Known for: Co-founding The Vegan Society
- Movement: Vegetarianism; Veganism
- Spouse: Walter Shrigley (m. 1939)

Elsie Beatrice Shrigley (née Salling; 30 October 1899 – 13 May 1978), also known as Sally Shrigley, was an English activist for vegetarianism and veganism. A member of the Vegetarian Society, she co-founded The Vegan Society in 1944 with Donald Watson after the society rejected a proposal to form a non-dairy section. Shrigley is sometimes credited with helping to coin the term "vegan". She later served as president of The Vegan Society and remained a member of its committee until her death.

== Biography ==
=== Early and personal life ===
Shrigley was born Elsie Beatrice Salling in North London in 1899 to a Swedish mother and Danish father. She married Walter Shrigley, a dentist, in 1939.

=== Vegetarian and vegan activism ===
Shrigley became a vegetarian in 1934 and gave up dairy products in 1944. In August 1944, she and Donald Watson proposed the creation of a non-dairy section within the Vegetarian Society. When the proposal was rejected, they and several others founded The Vegan Society in November 1944. Some sources credit Shrigley with coining the term "vegan" with Watson.

Shrigley served as honorary secretary of the Croydon Vegetarian Society from 1940 to 1958, and later became secretary of the Surrey Vegetarian Society. She also briefly served as acting secretary of the London Vegetarian Society and held posts in The Vegan Society, including its presidency from 1960 to 1963. Shrigley remained a member of the society's committee until her death.

=== Death ===
Shrigley died in Tonbridge, Kent, on 13 May 1978. An obituary was published in the Autumn 1978 issue of The Vegan.
