= Donald Watson =

English animal rights advocate (1910–2005)

- Watson reading the first issue of The Vegan
- Born: 2 September 1910; Mexborough, Yorkshire, England
- Died: 16 November 2005 (aged 95); Keswick, Cumbria, England
- Occupation: Woodwork teacher
- Known for: Co-founding The Vegan Society
- Spouse: Dorothy Morgan (m. 1946; died 1994)

Donald Watson (2 September 1910 – 16 November 2005) was an English animal rights and veganism advocate who co-founded The Vegan Society.

== Early life ==
Watson was born in Mexborough, Yorkshire, the son of a headmaster in a mining community. As a child, Watson spent time on his uncle George's farm. The slaughtering of a pig on the farm horrified Watson; he said his view of farm life changed from idyllic to a death row for animals. Watson began to reassess his practice of eating meat. He became a vegetarian in 1924 at the age of fourteen, making a New Year's resolution to never again eat meat. He gave up dairy products about 18 years later, having understood the production of milk-related products was also unethical.

He said:

I was surrounded by interesting animals. They all "gave" something: the farm horse pulled the plough, the lighter horse pulled the trap, the cows "gave" milk, the hens "gave" eggs and the cockerel was a useful "alarm clock" - I didn't realise at that time that he had another function, too. The sheep "gave" wool. I could never understand what the pigs "gave", but they seemed such friendly creatures - always glad to see me.

== Teaching ==
Upon leaving school at fifteen, Watson was apprenticed to a family joinery firm, and became a joinery teacher when he was twenty. He taught in Leicester, where he also played a large part in the Leicester Vegetarian Society. He moved on to Keswick, where he taught for 23 years. He stayed in the Lake District for the rest of his life. For several years, he devoted much time to working as a guided fell-walking leader, as well as to organic vegetable gardening, until very shortly before his death in 2005.

== Veganism and The Vegan Society ==
Watson did not smoke, consume alcohol, or make contact with foods or substances which he regarded as toxins. In the 1940s, after learning about milk production, he became a vegan. He explained his motivation as ethical concern for sentient animals:

We can see quite plainly that our present civilisation is built on the exploitation of animals, just as past civilisations were built on the exploitation of slaves, and we believe the spiritual destiny of man is such that in time he will view with abhorrence the idea that men once fed on the products of animals' bodies.

Critics claimed that he could not survive on his proposed diet. In November 1944, in Leicester, he and his wife, Dorothy, along with four friends—Elsie Shrigley, Mr G. A. Henderson and his wife Fay K. Henderson among them—founded The Vegan Society. They separated from the London Vegetarian Society and founded The Vegan Society because the former group refused to support veganism, which they saw as extreme and antisocial. (However, Watson remained a member of the London Vegetarian Society to keep in touch with the movement.) They had also decided they needed a word to describe their new way of life. The word 'vegan' was coined by Watson and his then-future wife Dorothy Morgan from the first three and last two letters of 'vegetarian' in 1944. The couple's collaborative efforts during the movement's early years, including their financial hardships and the specific origins of the word "vegan," were documented in the 2026 biography The Vegan Enigma: A Life of Donald and Dorothy Watson by historian Tilman Høgværdi. According to historical accounts and interviews with Watson, the word was brainstormed collectively while the couple was on a dance floor in 1944, and their daughter Janet later noted that Dorothy may have been the one to first propose the exact term.

Watson and The Vegan Society launched the first edition of the Society's quarterly newsletter, The Vegan News, in 1944. He ran the publication single-handed for two years, writing and duplicating the newsletter, and responding to the increasing volume of correspondence.

Watson expanded the vegan philosophy to object to any harm to living creatures. A committed pacifist throughout his life, he registered as a conscientious objector in World War II.

== Personal life ==
Watson enjoyed cycling, photography and playing the violin. While not a supporter of any particular political party, he took a keen interest in political issues throughout his life. He was an agnostic.

His brother and sister both adopted vegan lifestyles. All three Watson siblings registered as conscientious objectors during World War II.

Watson married Dorothy Morgan in 1946. His wife, who was a primary school teacher, predeceased her husband by about 10 years and died in 1994.

== Commemoration ==
In November 2019, a blue plaque was unveiled in honour of Donald Watson at his former Doncaster Road School, in Mexborough, South Yorkshire. The plaque was organised by Mexborough and District Heritage Society, and unveiled by Watson's nephew Dr Tim Cook, in honour of the seventy fifth anniversary of the foundation of The Vegan Society. A heritage panel to recognise Leicester as the home of veganism and to commemorate Watson was installed in March 2024 in Evesham Road, Leicester where he lived in the 1940s. His funeral was held at St Kentigern's Church, Crosthwaite and he is buried in its cemetery.

== See also ==
- List of animal rights advocates
