= That Vegan Teacher =

Canadian internet personality (born 1964)

- Born: September 24, 1964 (age 62); Montreal, Quebec, Canada
- Other names: Miss Kadie; Miss Karen; Vegan Teacher Karen
- Education: Concordia University
- Occupations: Internet personality; animal rights activist
- Spouses: Dave Hobson (m. 1988; div. 2021) Giorgio Benetti (m. 2021)
- Children: 3

YouTube information
- Channel: That Vegan Teacher
- Years active: 2018–present
- Genres: Veganism; Animal rights activism
- Subscribers: 725 thousand
- Views: 208 million
- Last updated: August 4, 2026

Kadie Karen Diekmeyer (born September 24, 1964), popularly known online as That Vegan Teacher, or also Vegan Karen, is a Canadian animal rights activist, internet personality and former educator, mainly known for promoting veganism. Before she started her online career, Diekmeyer was a nurse and later an ESL teacher but eventually left the latter job at the start of the COVID-19 pandemic. Diekmeyer is known for her TikTok, YouTube and Instagram accounts that promote veganism. Some of Diekmeyer's content is considered controversial, and has evoked accusations of religious discrimination, racism, and homophobia.

== Early life ==
Diekmeyer was born on September 24, 1964, in Montreal to George and Gerda Diekmeyer, and raised there with two siblings. She graduated from John Abbott College in 1985, worked as a registered nurse at the Lakeshore General Hospital for 25 years, and later attended Concordia University to become an ESL teacher in French Canadian schools for nine years. She worked both jobs before dropping her nursing career to work full time in the school system and eventually leaving her job at the start of the COVID-19 pandemic.

In 1995, Diekmeyer composed the nationalistic English-French folk song "Imaginez un Pays/Imagine a Country" and performed at the Unity Rally at the Place du Canada. She spoke of her anxiety before her public performance, which she had never done before, and got help from her friends and relatives to write the French lyrics. Cheryl Cornacchia of the Montreal Gazette called her "one of the dozens of do-it-yourself artists making a place for themselves in Montreal". In 1998, Diekmeyer self-released 500 copies of her debut studio album, "Some Things Can't Wait," and by 1999, Diekmeyer had written 47 songs, mainly about life and women's empowerment.

== Internet career ==
Diekmeyer became known for her TikTok and YouTube career of promoting veganism. She went viral on TikTok for a song called, "Eating Animals is Wrong, McDonald's", in July 2020. Some of Diekmeyer's content has been characterized as racist and homophobic, including the repurposing of the slogan of "I can't breathe" for a song expressing opposition to animal agriculture, as well as arguing that coming out as LGBT is a selfish act as opposed to doing so as vegan. Diekmeyer has also drawn criticism for comparing the animal agriculture industry to the Holocaust. In September 2020, she was criticized for saying she would no longer sign her organ donor card, "not [wanting] to donate [her] organs to meat eaters after [she] dies".

"With all the talk about how animals should be treated lately, my kids and I took a long look at our dog and decided not to eat any more meat. Here's an idea for a new law: before pet owners are allowed to eat cows, pigs, chickens, lambs or fish, they should first have to kill and eat an animal. In the scheme of things, what makes one animal more worthy of a life of love and safety than another?"

— Diekmeyer's open letter, 2004

In March 2021, she made a YouTube video, titled "Are You Racist?", in which she spelled out the word "nigger" in an acrostic poem and encouraged people to "ban cruelty instead of words." Another controversy arose in result of Diekmeyer's comment on a 2021 TikTok video by gaming YouTuber TommyInnit, where he talked about his YouTube Play Button, joking about showing it to girls. Using TikTok's stitch function, she responded, "Tommy! The nice vegan girls don't want to see your buttons, but if you want them to play with your buttons, you're going to have to show them your fruits and your vegetables," while taking out a cucumber, pear, and apple. Perceived as a sexual joke, it enraged people online, owing to TommyInnit's age, then 16. Diekmeyer defended herself, claiming she "had no idea who he was," and that at his age, he was considered a "college-age student" in Canada. Later that year, she was IP banned from TikTok after being mass-reported by users, though the exact cause was not specified. Diekmeyer posted a video on her YouTube page, promising to not give up on her platform. She criticized celebrity chef Gordon Ramsay in a video for his use of meat on his show, to which he reacted by posting a duet video, eating a beefburger and calling her a "vegan doughnut". She has made more TikTok accounts but most of them have been banned.

== Personal life and views ==
Diekmeyer speaks English and French. She condemns what she considers to be vegaphobia. Her open letter, "Dog persuaded them to give up meat", censuring cruelty to animals, was published in the Montreal Gazette in 2004, and as early as 1998, acknowledged, "It's hard for me to be politically correct, I know I shouldn't eat meat." She has three children with her first husband, and moved to Italy in 2024.

== Discography ==
=== Albums ===
Title	Album details
Some Things Can't Wait (as Karen Hobson)	Released: 1998; Label: Self-released; Format: CD

Notes

- Does not include content on streaming platforms.

== See also ==
- Animal rights
- Speciesism
- PETA
