= Gutmensch =

Pejorative German term for a sanctimonious do-gooder

Gutmensch (literally good human in German) is an ironic, sarcastic or disparaging cultural term similar to the English do-gooder. Those who use the term are implying that Gutmenschen have an overwhelming wish to be good and eagerly seek approval—further suggesting a supposed moralising and proselytising behaviour and being dogmatic, while prioritizing "right" and "correct" attitude or sentiment (Ultimate end, ethics of moral conviction) over responsible, balanced, rational and reflected decisions (ethics of responsibility). In political rhetoric Gutmensch is used as a polemic term.

== Context ==
Users of the term believe that people or groups of people with a specific moral attitude show a wrong or problematic behaviour. Therefore, it was used as a popular term in the 1980s for people who valued humanistic, altruistic, but also religious and human goals in life higher than utilitarian ones. They organise their actions, politics as well as their lives accordingly.

The term Gutmensch is also connected to the term political correctness and has been used in a derogatory manner since the mid-1990s. In general language use it is always used as a negatively connoted foreign appellation. A use that is meant in "a nice way" can often be found only in face-to-face conversations, such as the saying "to have a heart of gold", in generosity or in an extreme form of altruism.

The term also hints at the possible difference between "meant well" and "well done". Gutmenschen have good intentions, want to solve specific problems, or have the desire to create a better world. Those who use the term Gutmensch in a negative way evaluate the actions of Gutmenschen as not appropriate and/or unnecessary. This is how the term is used in everyday language. The German dictionary Duden, which included the term in 2000, defines Gutmensch as "a naive person who acts in an uncritical, exaggerated or tedious way while fighting for political correctness."

== Origins and use ==
According to researcher Rembert Hüser, the term Gutmensch was coined as a joke made by German feuilleton writers of the "generation 1989", such as Matthias Horx and Klaus Bittermann. They were among the authors of dictionaries opposing the protests of 1968. These dictionaries were written in the style of Eckardt Henscheids Dummdeutsch dictionary (dealing with language criticism) and can be considered a combination of popular and political literature. They did not differentiate between the meaning of a word and how it is used. Bittermann explains in his epilogue of the Wörterbuch des Gutmenschen (dictionary of the Gutmensch):

Literary scientist Karl Heinz Bohrer wrote at the end of his commentaries, in which he argued against the "terror of conciliation exerted by the provinciality of the Federal Republic of Germany": 'Maybe it would be best, if the Merkur established a little dictionary of the Gutmensch, including entries like tearing down the wall in our minds, constructive debates, weird thinking or stubbornness. We have long been waiting for that to happen, in vain as it turns out. Since things have not improved, we feel like we have to take care of that matter ourselves.'

Since the mid-1990s, Gutmensch has been used alongside political correctness in political and ideological debates, in order to degrade political opponents as over-moralizing.

Former Merkur publisher Kurt Scheel once claimed to have used the term first in that sense. Gutmensch was considered the "latest critical chic" in the art sections of newspapers. Writers like Klaus Bittermann came up with a variety of neologisms referring to PC and accompanying the appearance of Gutmensch. Some of them can roughly be translated as Gutmensch language, bleeding-heart language, attitudinal kitsch, attitudinal language or chatter jargon.

In 2006, the German Journalists Association (DJV) claimed that the term Gutmensch had its origins in Nazi Germany. Following that claim, the association planned on including the term in a handbook on the sensitive use of language for journalists, which they wanted to publish in cooperation with the Duisburg Institute of Language and Social Studies. However, some time later the Institute explicitly objected to that claim made by the DJV. Having conducted their own research on this topic, the Institute concluded that there was no clear connection between Gutmensch and Nazi Germany. Nevertheless, in a pre-published sample of the above-mentioned handbook, it was stated that Gutmensch had been introduced by the Nazis to refer to followers of Cardinal von Galen, who had openly opposed the Nazi programme of forced euthanasia. According to the DJV, Gutmensch was derived from the Yiddish expression "a gutt Mensch" (a good human). Furthermore, they indicated that it was Adolf Hitler, who in his book Mein Kampf had repeatedly used the prefix "gut" (good) in a derogatory way, so as to accuse people who expressed goodwill and good-heartedness of collaborating with what Hitler perceived as the German enemies.

Another widespread opinion on the origin of Gutmensch is that it was coined by Friedrich Nietzsche. There are numerous disparaging remarks in Nietzsche's writings concerning the "good human", albeit not as a fixed expression. The Association for the German Language mentions as their first source a 1985 edition of Forbes magazine, in which Franz Steinkühler, at that time co-chairman of Germany's biggest metalworker's union, is called a Gutmensch.

A more positive link may be Bertolt Brecht's play The Good Person of Szechwan (German: Der gute Mensch von Sezuan) whose main theme is the difficulty of acting good in a world that is not good.

Die Welt journalist Matthias Heine brings into play German pedagogical scientist Christian Oeser, who may have invented the term. In Oeser's book Letters to a Maiden on the most fundamental Topics of Aesthetics, published in 1859, he writes about naive Gutmenschen as follows: "Isn't it clear that in the end, such a gullible Gutmensch will be laughed at for his unconditional love towards humans, that the whole world will call him a fool and that he will eventually fall prey to his own weakness?"

Similar terms can be found in other languages as well, for example the Italian buonismo, with meanings all referring to the Gutmensch.

=== In areas critical of society ===
Occasionally, people who see themselves as critics of society ironically condemn would-be campaigners who criticize society without applying the same criteria to themselves. The term Gutmensch sees criticism of racism as symbolic when the speaker's own racist behaviour is not reflected. That kind of criticism means that political utterances which don't demand consequences are only made to allow the speaker to appear in a good light. Sunday speeches of politicians will be especially criticized if they pretend to be advocates for "victims". People who are concerned determinedly reject being locked into a role as victim.

The "friend of foreigners", having good intentions, is a specific example. According to humanistic approaches, they think everyone is equal, but foreigners impose their "own needs, ethical and moral ideas and goals" on him (jemandem etwas aufzwingen, aufdrängen) Sabine Forschner).

On 11 August 2014, Norbert Bolz (TU Berlin), an academic in media and communication, said on radio station Deutschlandfunk:

Gutmenschen are people who have oral presentation techniques that have been given a name in the last couple of decades, i.e. political correctness. This political correctness can be described precisely and therefore also the Gutmensch is described; it is composed of political moralisation, from a kind of hygiene of speech, with a vast amount of speech taboo and furthermore, also from a kind of frigidly puritan attitude.

== In political debates ==
The term is used with a different purpose and frequency in the overall political spectrum, i.e. as a polemic term in a discussion with (actual and would-be) representatives of a "political correctness", but mainly in the field of conservativeness, right-wing populism and right-wing totalitarianism.

=== In political rhetoric ===
The political right use the term more often in order to discredit political opposites. By downgrading "left" ideals to "do-goodism", they emphasise the claim to argue in a realistic way and on a factual level while the Gutmensch are implied to have lost touch with reality, to have a weak reflecting capacity, an unrealistic and high claim or utopian ideas. Michael Klonovsky, for example, chief executive at German news magazine Focus, accused:

The Gutmensch finds the fact outrageous that there is an unproductive lower class, a benefit-scrounging scum, that there is plebs. Therefore, he declares everyone of being bad who points it out to someone. If it is, on top of everything, an economic migrant, the popular accusation of racism and xenophobia is coming very likely into practice in the same way as the user of the term settles far from social inner cities.

People who are offended in such a way see this as a rhetoric trick, which ridicules their striving for humanism, solidarity and social equity. Seeing the counterpart as Gutmensch took the discussion to a personal (argumentum ad hominem = "ad personam") and emotional level, in order to avoiding a discussion on a content level.

The term is often used as an aggressive defense strategy against criticism on personal positions. Potential criticism on (factual or putative) racist, homophobic, antisemitic (and increasing also anti-Islamic) or sexual violations taboos is debilitated by downgrading the person with those rhetoric strategies.

=== Moralistic strategy ===
In political discussions the usage of the term Gutmensch gains a moral polarized shape, which is convenient to decrease the respect of the political opponent and to discredit them. There are strategies in political rhetoric to discuss political topics either on a factual level or on a moral level. Stigmatizations of political opponents by using terms like "pc" (political correctness) or Gutmensch moralize communications. Therefore, the position of the political opponent is discredited and he is forced to change position, if he doesn't want to lose reputation. Especially obvious becomes the strategy, if there are actual or claimed taboos. The art of the rhetoric is working when terms like Gutmensch or "moralizing prig" bring the political opponent in discussions into situations where the reply is supposed to say "my opinion or the tabooed view". This rhetoric proves as effective, because only under difficult circumstances can factual matters be discussed analytically. Knobloch (1998) from the University of Siegen refers to this relationship.

=== As "ideological code" ===
According to a discourse analytical survey, which was published by political scientist Katrin Auer in the Austrian Journal of Political Science, are especially topics placed by the political right under the cipher "pc" (the term coming up usually because of Gutmenschen) of which the society was not able to talk openly without falling victim to the "terror of Gutmenschen". Gutmenschen thereby revealed were often pictured club swinging, in this context talking about "moralizing prig", "racist prig", "fascist prig", "Auschwitz prig" or similar, so Auer. Therefore, a concept of the enemy and a concept of the taboo came up, in which in particular misogynist, racist and antisemitic comments appeared rebellious and taboo breaking, it was said in the article. The term Gutmensch functioned here as code in order to being able to talk and being understood in this paradigm without having to expose one's own attitude, Auer adds. A well-known example was to replace the word "Jew" by the term Gutmensch in antisemitic speeches. Parts of the audience which understood themselves not as antisemitic, were allowed to agree without hesitation, concludes Katrin Auer.

== Further use ==
=== Until 20th century ===
Gutmenschen, then called bonhommes or boni homines, was a term used for members of the heretic movement in medieval times. They were also referred to as Cathars, but for themselves they used the name veri christiani (true Christians). Aside from the derogatory use, the French term bonhomme (good person) did carry a positive connotation at times, ascribing moral qualities just as the English term gentleman does. On the other hand, it was none other than Karl Marx who used bonhomme in a derisive manner. He polemically wrote about "Jacque le bonhomme", which was a disguise for mocking Max Stirner.

=== Harald Martenstein ===
German author and journalist Harald Martenstein developed his own definition of Gutmensch after repeatedly having dealt with the term shitstorm (in German exclusively referring to an internet meme) in his writings. In 2015, he proposed using Gutmensch to describe people who act aggressive and self-righteous when fighting for what they think is the good cause, unmindfully considering themselves being excluded from any set of social rules. Gutmenschen, in that sense, believe that it is ok to be offensive, humiliating and to even exert violence. Not even having publicized his proposal, Martenstein already received heavy criticism. Among the critics was Die Welt journalist Matthias Heine, who accused Martenstein of tempting the wrong people to over-use the word by putting too much of an emphasis on the term, therefore turning Gutmensch into an unusable word for those being of sound mind. Ironically, one year earlier, German writer Akif Pirinçci had called Martenstein a Gutmensch in his polemic Deutschland von Sinnen (Germany unhinged). At that time, Martenstein was still rather in favor of the term, polemically explaining in his book Die neuen Leiden des alten M. (The New Suffering of Old M.): "As for good-doing and most things in general, it is a question of the dosage: when overdone it becomes totalitarian."

== Wordmark Gutmensch ==
In 2014, Patrick Orth, manager of German rock band Die Toten Hosen, registered the wordmark Gutmensch. Since then, the band has been selling print T-shirts labeled "Gutmensch – No one likes us. We don't care!".

== Unwort des Jahres ==
In Germany, the "Unwort des Jahres", a word with bad connotations, is annually nominated by a changing, independent jury of four linguists and one journalist. Gutmensch was nominated in 2011 (second position) and 2015 (first position). In 2011 the jury stated:

By using the term the ethical idea of the good man is picked up maliciously in internet forums in order to vilify all dissidents without considering their arguments. The term "Wutbürger" (enraged people) is used in a similar way, although the term Gutmensch violates principles of democracy (...). The term has been used in that way for already 20 years. However, it has gained more influence in different socio-political contexts in 2011 and has therefore increased its potential of vilifying dissidents.

The statement in 2015 said that the term is connected to the refugee crisis. Here, especially those are insulted who voluntarily help refugees or stand against refugee asylums attacks. The choice was influenced by the 2015 European migrant crisis. The term Gutmensch was selected because "readiness to help others" vilified everyone who helped as naive, stupid and unworldly. The criticism was not only against populists of the right, but also against journalists of important media channels who would use the term "Gutmensch".

== See also ==
- Baizuo (zh:白左)
- Busybody
- Do-gooder derogation
- The History of Little Goody Two-Shoes
