= Do-gooder derogation =

Negative perception of a person's morally motivated actions

Do-gooder derogation is a phenomenon in moral psychology where a person's morally motivated behavior leads to them being perceived negatively by others. The term "do-gooder" refers to a person who deviates from the majority in terms of behavior, because of their morality. The phenomenon was formally named and documented by Minson and Monin in 2012, who situated it within theories of social comparison and moral identity. Do-gooder derogation is distinct from, though related to, antisocial punishment, which refers specifically to the costly behavioural sanctioning of high cooperators in economic games, rather than attitudinal disparagement of morally motivated individuals.

== Background ==
A central theoretical basis for do-gooder derogation is the concept of moral identity. Research by Aquino and Reed (2002) suggests that people are strongly motivated to maintain a view of themselves as moral individuals, and that this self-perception is central to their overall sense of self-worth. When a do-gooder's behaviour highlights a gap between an observer's own conduct and their moral ideals, it threatens this self-image.

The groundwork for do-gooder derogation was laid by Monin, Sawyer, and Marquez (2008), in a study on what they termed the "rejection of moral rebels". Participants who had complied with a morally questionable task – identifying a guilty suspect in a racially biased criminal lineup – subsequently rated a confederate who had refused to comply as more hostile and self-righteous than those who had not faced the same moral conflict. This demonstrated that witnessing someone do the right thing can provoke resentment rather than admiration among those who chose not to act similarly, and is considered the empirical precursor to do-gooder derogation.

These findings build on Leon Festinger's (1954) social comparison theory, which holds that people evaluate their own opinions and abilities by comparing themselves to others. Upward moral comparisons – where another person appears more virtuous – tend to be more psychologically threatening than upward comparisons in other domains, such as skill or intelligence. This is because morality is more central to identity than most other attributes, meaning that being outperformed morally is particularly difficult to dismiss.

== Research ==
Research surrounding "do-gooder derogation" takes many different forms. These include public goods games, experiments designed to measure altruism and generosity, and the analysis of preexisting data. Studies on meat eaters' perceptions of vegetarians indicate that meat eaters held more negative views towards vegetarians if they imagined the vegetarians morally judging them for their dietary choices. From this, the researchers concluded that moral minorities may receive backlash for their morally motivated behavior from members of the mainstream who feel morally judged.

A study on generosity in children indicated that initially children favored generous individuals, but that this preference was reduced when the child's own generosity was not as good as another child's. However, this did not hold up when the child compared their own generosity to an adult.

A combination of moral and dominance personality traits in a person have been linked to an increased level of moral self-righteousness and dislike by perceivers.

Research suggests that the most generous can be punished more than those less generous.

== Possible motivations ==
=== Threatened sense of morality and self-worth ===
One possible reason for do-gooder derogation is 'anticipated moral reproach'. This describes a threat to one's moral standing and to their sense of self-worth.

Research suggests that since people are highly sensitive to any criticism or challenge to their morals, they are more likely to put down the source of this 'threat'.

In research regarding non-vegetarians' attitudes towards vegetarians, non-vegetarians tended to harbor more hostile feelings towards vegetarians when they believed that the vegetarians saw themselves as morally superior. However, not all vegetarians choose to be so because of moral reasons.

Other research looked at morally uncomfortable decision-making scenarios, for example a criminal lineup where the obvious guilty suspect is the only African American suspect and participants were asked to pick out the guilty suspect. Most participants followed the instructions, but 'moral do-gooders' refused to, on the basis that the activity was 'offensive'. The moral do-gooders were disliked by the rest of the group and rated more negatively in the first experiment. However, later in the study, participants were assured of their moral standing and the validity of their own decisions despite that of the moral do-gooder, and they were less sensitive to moral reproach, rating the do-gooders less negatively.

=== Social comparison and violation of social norms ===
Another possible explanation for do-gooder derogation is social comparison. Tasimi, Dominguez & Wynn (2015) offered the idea that do-gooder derogation could be put down to do-gooders deviating from the social norm.

In a public goods game, where there was a punishment condition introduced, participants tended to punish anyone who cooperated more or less than the social norm: the low contributors, but also the high contributors, even though their generosity benefited the whole group.

In addition, real-world data from an online fundraising website found that not only were the lowest donations anonymized, but so were the highest. This is compatible with the explanation of social comparison, whereby those donating the highest amounts are violating the social norms and therefore maintain anonymity. This might be because the top donators have set the bar at an undesirably high level and "make the contributions of others look less impressive by comparison."

In another study looking at do-gooder derogation in children, participants preferred a more generous character throughout the study, which has inconsistencies with do-gooder derogation. However, when the child's generosity was less than that of another child, it didn't reverse their preference for the more generous child; their preference for the generous child lessened, but didn't disappear. The authors suggest that social comparison may lead children to feel less positively towards peers who demonstrate greater generosity than themselves, while this effect doesn't appear to occur when comparing themselves to more generous adults.

In the original public goods game, researchers found that a relevant factor in do-gooder derogation is their level of involvement in the decision: if the participant made a less generous decision before the do-gooder made theirs, they were more likely to feel negatively towards the do-gooder. However, if they were onlookers in the game, they were more likely to rate the do-gooders positively.

=== Moderating factors ===
Research has identified several factors that moderate the strength of do-gooder derogation. Wellman, Mayer, Ong, and DeRue (2016) found that the effect is significantly shaped by power and role expectations in organisational settings: employees low in legitimate power who raise moral objections face greater social sanctions than those in positions of authority, because observers expect leaders to speak up but expect subordinates to comply.

Group membership also moderates the effect. Kutlaca, Becker, and Radke (2020) found that individuals who confronted sexist or racist behaviour were evaluated positively overall, but were judged more harshly by members of their own group than by outgroup members – a pattern the authors described as being "a hero for the outgroup, a black sheep for the ingroup". This suggests that derogation is not solely driven by personal moral threat, but can also reflect a desire to protect the perceived moral standing of one's social group.

=== Other possible explanations ===
- Existential freedom: individuals will ignore their own freedom in decision making, blaming their decision on situational pressures.
- Perceived altruism of the act: if individuals performed altruistic acts for intended gains, the act is seen as more selfish than altruistic. There is also the possibility of ulterior motives behind altruistic acts: do-gooder derogation may be a defense mechanism.
- Feelings of lesser morality: individuals might question their own morality as they compare themselves with do-gooders.
- Shame and guilt: do-gooders are more likely to be derogated when others' sense of being a good person is threatened.

== Cross-cultural differences ==
There are also cross-cultural differences in the extent to which do-gooder derogation happens. Hermann, Thöni & Gächter (2008) looked at cross-cultural differences when carrying out their public goods experiment in 16 different participant pools. Raihani (2014) also observed some cultural differences with regards to donations and anonymity. Some of the findings were:

- In western Europe and the United States, punishment conditions, rather than non-punishment conditions, increased the cooperation between participants. This might be reflective of the importance and dominance of the law is in these societies.
- Muslim participants were more likely to donate higher amounts to a charitable cause under anonymous conditions. This could be because of the dismissal of 'impure' status-seeking generosity in Islam.
- Collectivist societies seem to punish do-gooders more than in individualistic societies. Collectivist cultures may indeed be more inclined to perceive other participants as part of the out-group, especially if they are violating social norms by being overly generous.

== Real-world applications ==
=== Environmental advocacy ===
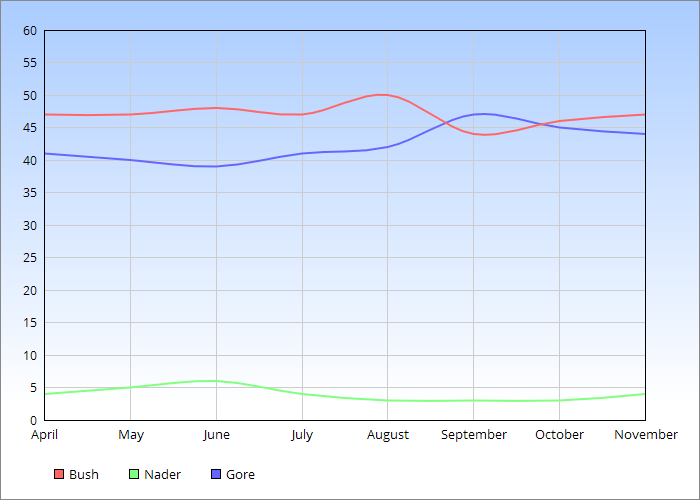
2000 presidential polling including candidate and environmentalist Al Gore.

Do-gooder derogation has been examined in the context of climate change communication. Sparkman and Attari (2020) identified a "double bind" facing advocates for decarbonisation: while lifestyle inconsistency between an advocate's behaviour and their message undermines their credibility, exemplary sustainable behaviour can trigger do-gooder derogation among audiences who feel implicitly judged for their own carbon footprints.

=== Dietary behaviour ===
Research has shown the consequences of do-gooder derogation for moral minorities themselves. Bolderdijk and Cornelissen (2022) described what they termed the "do-gooder's dilemma": adapting the classic conformity paradigm developed by Solomon Asch, they found that vegetarian and vegan participants were reluctant to publicly express their dietary preferences when surrounded by meat-eaters, self-silencing to avoid anticipated social stigma. The authors noted that this self-silencing may slow broader dietary change by reinforcing the perception that plant-based diets are a niche preference.

=== Workplace ethics ===
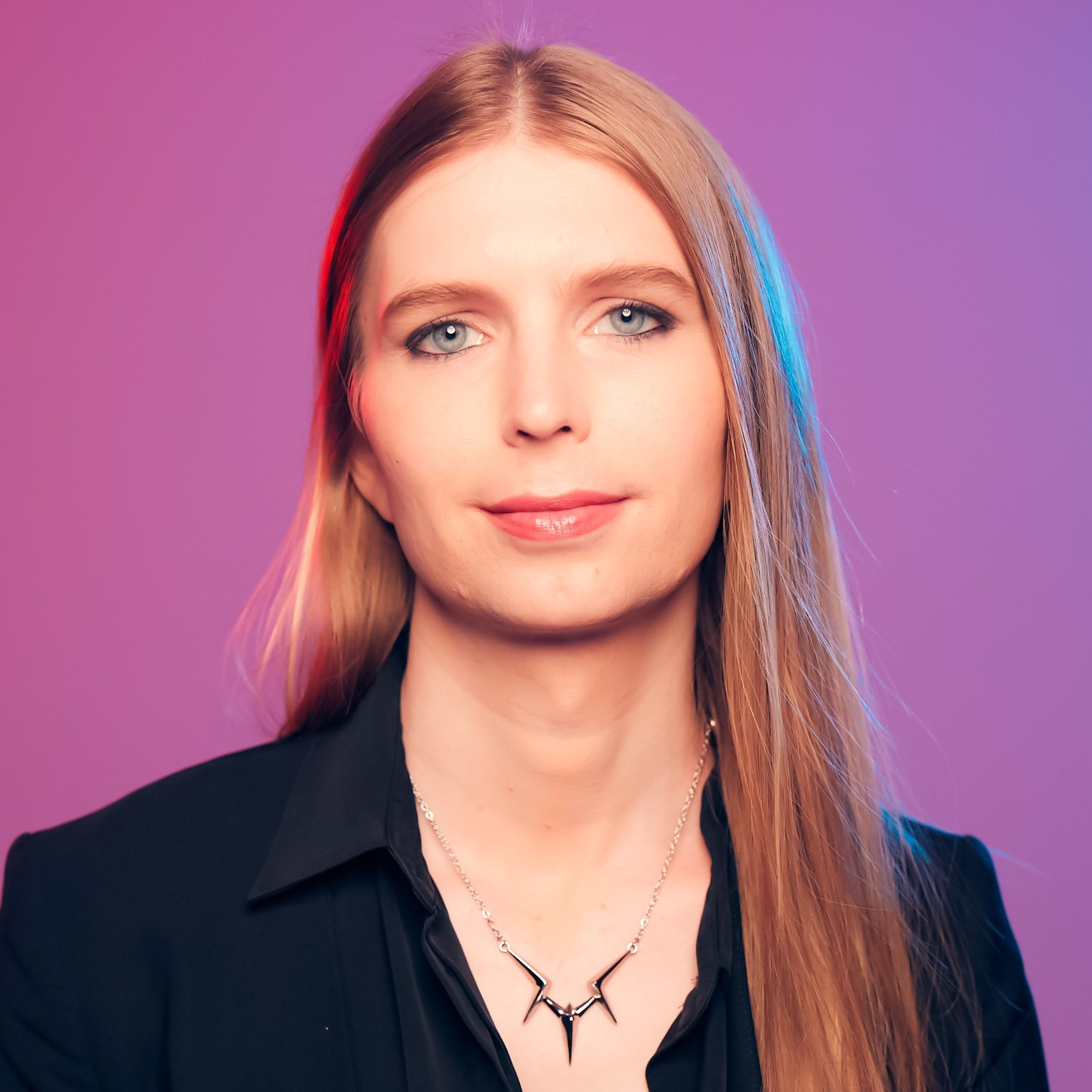
Whistleblower Chelsea Manning convicted for her activities.

Do-gooder derogation has also been examined in organisational settings. Wellman, Mayer, Ong, and DeRue (2016) found that employees who take principled stands against unethical workplace practices – a behaviour the authors termed "moral objection" – are frequently perceived as less warm than colleagues who comply, and may face social sanctions including insults and exclusion as a result. The study found this effect was moderated by legitimate power: employees low in formal authority who raised moral objections faced stronger negative reactions than those in leadership positions, because observers expect leaders to speak up but expect subordinates to comply. This has direct implications for whistleblowing, suggesting that the social costs of ethical dissent may discourage employees from reporting wrongdoing.

=== Public health ===
The dynamics of do-gooder derogation have been observed in public health contexts. Prosser et al. (2020) examined the potential consequences of moralising COVID-19 mitigation practices such as social distancing, arguing that visibly rule-following individuals risked being perceived as do-gooders by non-compliers, potentially triggering derogation and group polarisation that could undermine sustained behaviour change at a population level. This suggests that public health guidance – and whether compliance becomes associated with moral superiority – may have unintended consequences for how guidance is received across different social groups.

== Limitations ==
The majority of foundational research on do-gooder derogation relies on the vegetarian paradigm introduced by Minson and Monin (2012), in which meat-eaters' attitudes toward vegetarians serve as the primary measure of the phenomenon. While this paradigm has proven productive, it raises questions about whether findings generalise to other moral domains – such as political dissent, environmental activism, or giving to charity – where the nature of the moral threat and the relationship between perceiver and do-gooder may differ substantially.

A related concern is the demographic composition of study samples. Much of the existing research draws on participants from WEIRD societies – Western, Educated, Industrialised, Rich, and Democratic – which may not be representative of how do-gooder derogation operates globally. This is underscored by Herrmann, Thöni & Gächter (2008), who found significant cross-cultural variation in how do-gooders are treated, suggesting the phenomenon is shaped by cultural context rather than being universal.

Finally, the majority of studies measure attitudes toward do-gooders or willingness to punish in controlled, hypothetical scenarios rather than tracking behaviour in natural settings over time. It therefore remains an open question whether do-gooder derogation produces lasting reputational or interpersonal consequences in everyday life, or whether its effects are more transient than laboratory findings suggest.

== See also ==
- The History of Little Goody Two-Shoes
- Busybody
- Gutmensch
- Psychology of eating meat
- Tall poppy syndrome
- Vegaphobia
- Virtue signalling
- Law of Jante
- Social comparison bias
