= Klaus Bittermann =

German author and publisher

Klaus Bittermann (born 1952, Kulmbach, West Germany), also known under the pseudonym of Artur Cravan, is a German author and publisher.

== Life ==
Bitterman, in the early 1970s, moved to Nuremberg to attend the University of Erlangen-Nuremberg, majoring in philosophy, sociology and political science. Even as a student he worked as a book producer.

Since 1979 he runs the publishing house Edition Tiamat, initially in Nuremberg, but from 1981 onward in Berlin. He also writes and is a satirist. Under the pseudonym "Artur Cravan" he wrote a Berlin thriller trilogy.

== Bibliography ==
- Die Arbeit des Verdrängens. In: Die alte Straßenverkehrsordnung. Dokumente der RAF. Mit Beiträgen von Wolfgang Pohrt, K. Hartung, Gabriele Goettle, Joachim Bruhn, Karl Heinz Roth, K. Bittermann Edition Tiamat, Berlin 1986, ISBN 3-923118-06-6, S. 199-212.
- Das Sterben der Phantome. Verbrechen und Öffentlichkeit. Berlin 1988.
- als Herausgeber: Gemeinsam sind wir unausstehlich. Die Wiedervereinigung und ihre Folgen. Edition Tiamat, Berlin 1990, ISBN 3-923118-42-2 (= Critica diabolis, Band 27).
- Geisterfahrer der Einheit. Kommentare zur Wiedervereinigungskrise. Berlin – Amsterdam 1995.
- Strandgut der Geschichte. München 2001, ISBN 3-923646-78-X.
- Noch alle Schweine im Rennen? Mainz 2001, ISBN 3-930559-74-9.
- In Schlucken-zwei-Spechte (Harry Rowohlt erzählt Ralf Sotscheck sein Leben von der Wiege bis zur Biege). Berlin 2002, ISBN 3-89320-053-3.
- The Crazy Never Die. Amerikanische Rebellen in der populären Kultur. Berlin 2011, ISBN 978-3-89320-153-2.
- als (Hrsg.): Das Wörterbuch des Gutmenschen. Betroffenheitsjargon und Gesinnungskitsch. München 1998, ISBN 3-492-22695-7.
- als (Hrsg.): It's a Zoni. Zehn Jahre Wiedervereinigung. Die Ossis als Belastung und Belästigung. Berlin 2002, ISBN 3-89320-026-6.
- als (Hrsg.): Literatur als Qual und Gequalle. Über den Kulturbetriebsintriganten Günter Grass. Berlin 2007, ISBN 978-3-89320-108-2.
- Der Aufstand der Kuscheltiere. Haffmans Verlag bei zweitausendundeins, 2007, ISBN 978-3-86150-800-7.
- als Hrsg.: Unter Zonis: Zwanzig Jahre reichen jetzt so langsam mal wieder. Ein Rückblick. Berlin 2009, ISBN 978-3-89320-137-2.
- The Crazy Never Die. Amerikanische Rebellen in der populären Kultur. Edition Tiamat/Verlag Klaus Bittermann, Berlin 2011, ISBN 978-3-89320-153-2.
- Möbel zu Hause, aber kein Geld für Alkohol. Kreuzberger Szenen. Edition Tiamat, Berlin 2011, ISBN 978-3-89320-159-4.
- Alles schick in Kreuzberg: unter Touristen, Pennern, Gentrifzierten, Edition Tiamat, Berlin 2013, ISBN 978-3-89320-182-2 (= Critica diabolis, Band 213 - fälschlicherweise als Band 212 der Schriftenreihe bezeichnet).
