= Brush with Greatness =

- The Simpsons episode
- Episode no.: Season 2 Episode 18
- Directed by: Jim Reardon
- Written by: Brian K. Roberts
- Production code: 7F18
- Original air date: April 11, 1991

Guest appearances
- Ringo Starr as himself; Jon Lovitz as Professor Lombardo and the doughnut delivery man

Episode features
- Chalkboard gag: "I will not hide behind the Fifth Amendment"
- Couch gag: The couch tips over with the family sitting on it and Maggie sits in its place.
- Commentary: Matt Groening; Brian K. Roberts; Al Jean; Jim Reardon

Episode chronology
← Previous "Old Money"	Next → "Lisa's Substitute"
- The Simpsons season 2

"Brush with Greatness" is the eighteenth episode of the second season of the American animated television series The Simpsons. It originally aired on Fox in the United States on April 11, 1991. In the episode, Marge enrolls in an art class after Lisa encourages her to revive her former interest in painting. When she wins first prize in a local art competition for a portrait of Homer on the couch in his underwear, Mr. Burns commissions her to paint his portrait. In the subplot, Homer is determined to lose weight after getting stuck in a water slide at an amusement park.

The episode was written by Brian K. Roberts and directed by Jim Reardon. Beatles member Ringo Starr guest starred as himself, while Jon Lovitz starred as Marge's art teacher, Professor Lombardo. The episode features cultural references to films such as Rocky and Gone with the Wind.

Since airing, the episode has received mostly positive reviews from television critics, who praised its central focus on Marge, as well as Starr's role. It acquired a Nielsen rating of 12.0 and was the second highest-rated show on Fox the week it aired.

== Plot ==
After being pestered by Bart and Lisa, Homer reluctantly takes the Simpsons to the Mount Splashmore water park. The park's rescue crew is forced to close the water slide ride after Homer gets stuck inside, where the blocked section is craned off to be rescued. That night, the news media poke fun at Homer's massive size during their coverage of his mishap at the water park.

After learning that he weighs 260 pounds (120 kg), Homer vows to go on a diet and get more exercise. While Homer is looking for his weights in the attic, Bart stumbles upon several old paintings of the drummer Ringo Starr that Marge had made as a high school student. Marge reveals she was scolded by her art teacher for painting Starr, on whom she had a crush. She sent a painting to Starr for his "honest opinion", but she never got a response back. After Lisa suggests that Marge take a painting class at Springfield Community College, she paints Homer asleep on the couch in his underwear, earning praise from her teacher, Professor Lombardo. The painting wins the college art show, earning Marge fame and newspaper headlines.

Mr. Burns asks Marge to paint his portrait for a new wing of the Springfield Art Museum. Marge agrees, although she resists Homer's plea to paint Burns as a beautiful man. While Burns is taking a shower at the Simpsons' house, Marge inadvertently sees him naked. Homer finds he has lost 21 pounds from his exercise regimen and now weighs 239 pounds (108 kg). After Burns disparages Homer's weight and his daughters, Lisa and Maggie, Marge throws Burns out of the house. She is ready to quit until she receives a response from Starr, who, though decades late, praises her portrait of him. Homer encourages Marge to finish the painting.

Marge's painting of a naked, frail and weak Burns is unveiled at the opening of the museum wing, much to the shock of both Burns and the crowd, causing Smithers to faint. She explains that the portrait shows that behind all of Burns' evil, he is a frail and vulnerable human being who is by extension just as beautiful as any other living creature in the world. With that in mind, the crowd praises Marge's portrait; even an impressed Burns does the same before thanking Marge for a job well done.

== Production ==
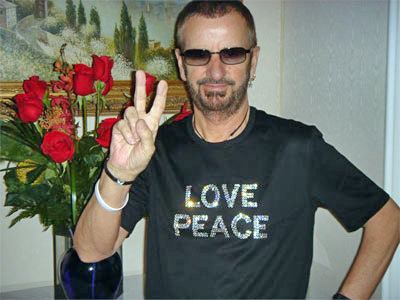
Ringo Starr guest stars in the episode as himself.

Al Jean and Mike Reiss originally pitched the idea of Marge taking an art class and churning out depressing paintings, with the family realizing she was secretly unhappy. James L. Brooks took that pitch and came up with the Burns commission plot as well as the idea she would paint him as frail and naked. The script was written by Brian K. Roberts and directed by Jim Reardon. Prior to writing the episode, Roberts had been an audio and visual editor on the show. Musician Ringo Starr made a guest appearance in the episode as himself. He was the first Beatle to appear on the show; both George Harrison and Paul McCartney would later guest star in the season five episode "Homer's Barbershop Quartet" and the season seven episode "Lisa the Vegetarian" respectively. When the story of Marge's having a crush on Starr was pitched out, Roberts took the opportunity to write Starr into the script because he had always wanted to meet a Beatle. He then sent the script to Starr, who was then in southern France. Starr agreed to do the guest appearance after reading only two lines, and he told Roberts he would be able to do it when he visited Los Angeles a few weeks later. The staff was thrilled, and they immediately decided to expand his role. When Ringo arrived to record and saw the part was longer, he told the staff, "you’ve written me a bloody novel." The Simpsons creator Matt Groening said of the guest appearance: "We were so excited that we got Ringo Starr coming in to do the show and we recorded him over at the Complex in West Los Angeles. We were given a list of rules about what we couldn't do to Ringo, such as 'Don't touch him', 'Don't approach him', and 'Don't ask for his autograph'. But of course when he shows up in this big limo, Brian brings out a big poster and asks him to sign it!" Roberts explained that he had not received the memo with the rules so he showed up with a copy of the script cover and asked Starr to sign it. Groening asked Starr if he wanted to be animated the way he was in Yellow Submarine or the way he was in the cartoon series The Beatles. Starr chose Yellow Submarine because he did not like his appearance in the cartoon. In addition to Starr, the episode features a guest appearance by Jon Lovitz as Lombardo and the doughnut delivery man who delivers doughnuts to the nuclear power plant. Lombardo's physical appearance was based on an art teacher Reardon had in art school.

== Cultural references ==
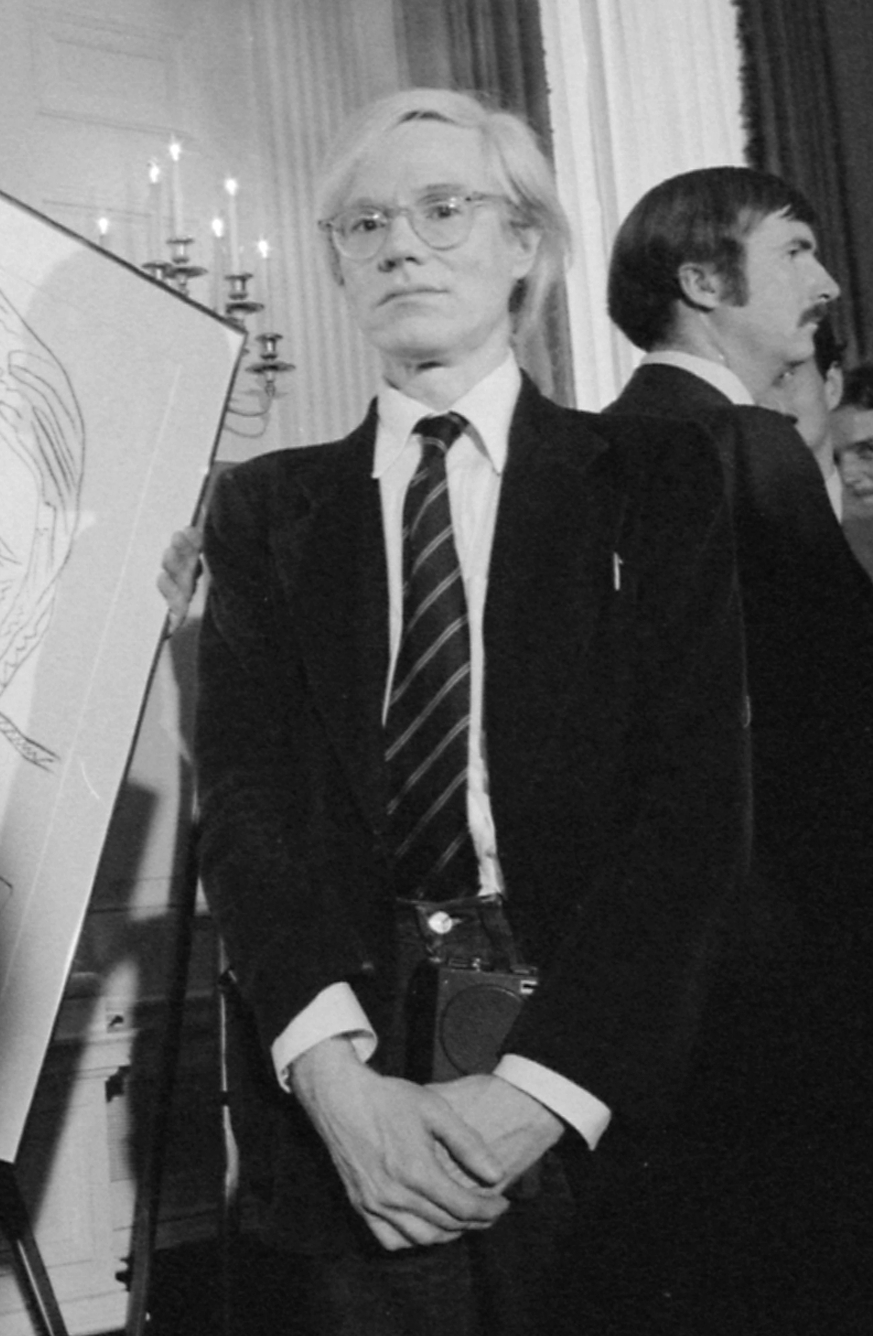
Pop artist Andy Warhol

The line for the H_{2}WHOA! ride reproduces the staircases in the lithograph Ascending and Descending by M. C. Escher. The way Krusty removes the clown make-up from his face resembles the way The Joker removes his make-up in the 1989 film Batman. When Homer announces he is going on a diet, he says: "As God is my witness, I'll always be hungry again!", a reference to the famous line "As God is my witness ... I'll never be hungry again!" from the film Gone with the Wind. Homer exercises in a way similar to how Rocky exercises in the 1976 film Rocky. The music that plays as Homer approaches the scale is the main theme from the film The Good, the Bad and the Ugly. A copy of Andy Warhol's painting Campbell's Soup Cans is visible at the art gallery.

== Reception ==
In its original broadcast, "Brush with Greatness" finished thirty-seventh in the ratings for the week of April 8–14, 1991, with a Nielsen rating of 12.0, equivalent to approximately eleven million viewing households. It was the second highest-rated show on Fox that week, following Married... with Children.

The episode received positive reviews from television critics. Many lauded the use of Starr; for instance, IGN ranked his performance in the episode, along with Paul McCartney's performance in "Lisa the Vegetarian" and George Harrison's performance in "Homer's Barbershop Quartet", as the tenth best guest appearance in The Simpsons' history. They added that "Although none of these appearances were really large, the fact that the most popular band of all time appeared on The Simpsons is a large statement on the popularity and importance of the show."

Doug Pratt, a DVD reviewer and Rolling Stone contributor, wrote that "Brush with Greatness" has a "well thought-out" plot and he enjoyed the use of Starr and Marge's previously undiscovered talents. Paul A. Cantor, author of the book Gilligan Unbound: Pop Culture in the Age of Globalization, said that "once again Brian K. Roberts proves his genius with 'Brush with Greatness' in a superb work where Marge cultivates her wonderful artistic side". DVD Movie Guide's Colin Jacobson wrote: "From the opening at Mt. Splashmore through Homer's diet and the unveiling of Mr. Burns' controversial portrait, the episode packed a lot of great material. It also expanded Marge's character in a pleasing way, as it avoided any semblance of sappiness; we needed a break from sentiment after 'Old Money'. Overall, 'Brush with Greatness' provided a terrific episode."

The authors of the book I Can't Believe It's a Bigger and Better Updated Unofficial Simpsons Guide, Gary Russell and Gareth Roberts, wrote: "A superb episode, with Marge rightfully centre stage. Despite his general unpleasantness, Mr. Burns' gratitude to Marge is both welcome and unexpected. And the dig at Water Parks is spot on." In October 2008, Ringo Starr posted a video on his website in which he said he was too busy to answer fan mail and that all mail sent to him after October 20 would be thrown out. Although Starr did not mention "Brush with Greatness" in the video, several media sources compared his announcement to his portrayal in the episode.
