= List of fictional vegetarian and vegan characters =

This is a list of fictional characters who either self-identify as vegetarian or vegan, or have been identified as such by others.

== Analysis and reception of characters ==
Some scholars have argued that mass media serves as a "source of information for individuals" interested in vegetarianism or veganism, while there are "increasing social sanctions against eating meat." Even so, there are lingering stereotypes of vegans and vegetarians in the same media, with journalist Farhad Manjoo writing in August 2019 that it is "still widely acceptable to make fun of vegans." Manjoo observed that vegetarian and vegan characters are often portrayed negatively, such as being "smug" and "annoying". This portrayal, he suggested, can contribute to vegaphobia and may encourage meat-eaters to mock and provoke those who do not consume meat. Some writers, such as John L. Cunningham, have argued for "more sympathetic vegetarian characters in the mass media".

== Criteria for inclusion ==
- Listed characters are either protagonists and recurring characters.
- Characters must come from somewhat well-known media, as opposed to obscure or indie media.
- Animal characters (herbivores) are, for the most part with some exceptions, excluded from this list, especially if it is not actually stated that they do not eat meat.

The names are organized alphabetically by surname (i.e. last name), or by single name if the character does not have a surname. If more than two characters are in one entry, the last name of the first character is used.

== Animated series ==
Characters	Show title	Character debut date	Country	Notes
Aang	Avatar: The Last Airbender, The Legend of Korra	February 21, 2005	USA	According to the show's creators, "Buddhism and Taoism have been huge inspirations behind the idea for Avatar." As shown in "The King of Omashu" and "The Headband", a notable aspect of Aang's character is his vegetarian diet, which is consistent with Buddhism, Hinduism, and Taoism. In the Brahmajāla Sutta, a Buddhist code of ethics, vegetarianism is encouraged.
Appa	Avatar: The Last Airbender	February 21, 2005	USA	Appa, Aang's Sky Bison, is also vegetarian.
Beast Boy	Teen Titans, Teen Titans Go!	July 19, 2003	USA	Beast Boy is a shapeshifter who has been transformed into "animals who are commonly used for meat production," with some criticizing his character as a stereotype of a "militant crybaby vegetarian." He has also been a vegetarian in the comics since 2017.
Jessica Cruz (Green Lantern)	DC Super Hero Girls	March 8, 2019	USA	A lead character in this series, she is not only a pacifist, but also a vegan and environmentalist, resulting in her becoming friends with Pam Isley. She often professes her commitment to the environment and plant-based meals.
Count Duckula	Count Duckula	September 6, 1988	UK	As the series went into production, one of the writers suggested he become a vegetarian, which added an even sillier concept to the series, making him "an egotistical vegetarian vampire duck" within a castle.
Draculaura	Monster High	May 5, 2010	USA	Some have said she deserves recognition as "one of the very few outspoken vegan cartoon characters out there." Despite being a vampire, she consumes fruits, vegetables and "a lot of iron supplements" instead of blood. Mattel vice-president of design Kiyomi Haverly said "she's a vegan. She's turned off by meat. Girls could really relate to that because that's part of what they're thinking of these days."
Bliss Goode	The Goode Family	May 27, 2009	USA	The family are made up of a number of vegetarian environmentalists who attempt to be "politically correct in every way."
Charlie	The Goode Family	May 27, 2009	USA	The family are made up of a number of vegetarian environmentalists who attempt to be "politically correct in every way."
Che	The Goode Family	May 27, 2009	USA	The family are made up of a number of vegetarian environmentalists who attempt to be "politically correct in every way."
Gerald Goode	The Goode Family	May 27, 2009	USA	The family are made up of a number of vegetarian environmentalists who attempt to be "politically correct in every way."
Helen Goode	The Goode Family	May 27, 2009	USA	The family are made up of a number of vegetarian environmentalists who attempt to be "politically correct in every way."
Ubuntu Goode	The Goode Family	May 27, 2009	USA	The family are made up of a number of vegetarian environmentalists who attempt to be "politically correct in every way."
Petratishkovna "Tish" Katsufrakis	The Weekenders	February 26, 2000	USA	Intelligent and artistic, Tish is openly vegetarian, and eats a "carrot in a bun" in the show's opening credits.
Mira	The Hollow	June 8, 2018	Canada	In the first episode of Season 2, Mira's dad, Curtis, says "one veggie burger, for our favorite herbivore" and later, her adopted brother, Miles, says "...you're a vegetarian, remember?" While Mira accepts this, she still realizes the world is fake. In the series finale, Curtis serves Mira and her friends veggie burgers.
Nadia	Nadia: The Secret of Blue Water	April 13, 1990	Japan	The main protagonist of the series. She has the ability to communicate with animals and cares deeply for them. She is a pacifist and a vegetarian, and openly condemns violence, meat-eating, and hunting.
Apu Nahasapeemapetilon	The Simpsons	February 25, 1990	USA	Apu is a vegan, as revealed in the season 7 episode "Lisa the Vegetarian".
Panda	We Bare Bears	July 27, 2015	USA	The show's pilot and in the episode "Tote Life" he is revealed to be a vegetarian. He is an ovo vegetarian, along with having severe allergies to peanuts and cats.
Iron Fist (Danny Rand)	Ultimate Spider-Man	April 1, 2012	USA	A martial artist also known by the name Iron Fist, he can not only "summon his chi," but he is a vegetarian, with his diet mentioned directly in this animated series.
Evil Dragon Ravendia	A Herbivorous Dragon of 5,000 Years Gets Unfairly Villainized	2022–2024	Japan	A giant, but timid dragon, which lives in a secluded mountain area, and is herbivorous, while detesting pain, but helps people if necessary.
Norville "Shaggy" Rogers	What's New, Scooby Doo?	September 14, 2002	USA	Before this animated series, Shaggy, known for having an "enormous appetite" earlier in the Scooby-Doo franchise, "started leaving meat out of his meals" and in one episode it is shown that he is vegetarian. The decision to make Shaggy a vegetarian occurred after his voice actor, Casey Kasem, convinced the producers to do so, since he was a vegan who supported animal rights and opposed factory farming, saying he would refuse to voice Shaggy unless the character was vegetarian.
Lisa Simpson	The Simpsons	December 17, 1989	USA	In the October 15, 1995, episode "Lisa the Vegetarian," Lisa decides to stop eating meat after bonding with a lamb at a petting zoo. Her schoolmates and family members ridicule her for her beliefs, but with the help of Apu as well as Paul and Linda McCartney, she commits to vegetarianism. The staff promised that she would remain a vegetarian, resulting in one of the few permanent character changes made in the show.
Tenzin	The Legend of Korra	April 28, 2012	USA	Tenzin, like all Air Nomads, follows a strict vegetarian diet. He attempts to convince a meat-eating airbender to join them in the episode "Rebirth", by noting the vegetarian diet of airbenders.
Steven Universe	Steven Universe, Steven Universe Future	November 4, 2013	USA	In the Steven Universe Future episode "Snow Day", Steven tells the other Crystal Gems that he has been a vegetarian for a month, drinks protein shakes, and does "his own skincare routine."

== Comics and manga ==
Characters	Name of comic	Years	Country	Notes
Bernhard "Buddy" Baker (Animal Man)	Animal Man	1988–1990	USA	Buddy, otherwise known as Animal Man, argued with his wife "about meat consumption," criticized conditions in factory farms, and opposed scientific testing on animals. He also, in another comic, assists animal rights activists in helping save dolphins, leading some to call him "probably most active in fighting for animal rights" of all the superhero characters.
Bruce Banner	Ultimate Wolverine vs. Hulk	2005–2009	USA	It is shown in Ultimate Wolverine vs. Hulk that Bruce Banner is vegan, but it is not known if this has "anything to do with his alter ego's cannibalistic tendencies."
Broo	Astonishing X-Men Vol. 3	2004–2013	USA	Mutant of the Brood species and formerly a student at the Jean Grey School of the X-Men, he is an "extremely sensitive, intelligent, and caring" character who is also vegetarian.
Karolina Dean	Runaways	2003–present	USA	Karolina Dean, also known as Lucy in the Sky or L.S.D., is a lesbian, a vegan, and "an ardent animal lover...committed to a life completely free of meat and dairy."
Connor Hawke (Green Arrow)	DC Comics	1994–present	USA	Previously the sidekick of Green Arrow, he becomes "the second Green Arrow," and it was shown that he "was a practicing Buddhist and devout vegetarian," as shown first in "Green Arrow and Black Canary" Vol. 1 #13, and later in other comics. Later he ended up in a coma, not remembering being a hero, archer, or vegetarian, although he somehow healed himself.
Todd Ingram	Scott Pilgrim	2006	Canada	Todd is Ramona Flowers's third ex-boyfriend and a rock star who is "really smart or incredibly dumb." However, being a vegan gives him "psychic powers" which he uses against Pilgrim in Scott Pilgrim and the Infinite Sadness, although he is later revealed to be "cheating on his vegan diet." He later appears in Scott Pilgrim Takes Off, where he can make "vegan portals" and is in a romantic relationship with Wallace Wells on the movie set.
Nagisa Katayama	Nigakute Amai	2009–2016	Japan	She "excels at cooking" food and is also a vegetarian in this food-centered manga, who lives with a woman, Maki Eda, who hates vegetables. This was later adapted into a live-action film.
Magneto	Ultimate X-Men no. 1 - Ultimatum no. 5	2001–2009	USA	He has "chosen to abstain from animal products" for unknown reasons, possibly because he "feels for the animals and does not want to harm innocent creatures."
Wanda Maximoff	Scarlet Witch vol. 2	2016	USA	Originally introduced in 1964 as a villain, Wanda, otherwise known as the Scarlet Witch, later became "a member of the Avengers," and it is later revealed that she does not eat meat or drink alcohol.
Millie	Mutts	1994–present	USA	In a number of comic strips in Thanksgiving 2013, Millie, who owns a cat, "decides to cook a vegan meal" for Thanksgiving, with her husband not "sold on the idea," but later admits he "didn't miss the turkey."
Queen	The Hero and His Elf Bride Open a Pizza Parlor in Another World	2018	Japan	The queen of the kingdom in which the protagonist is transported into is said to be "health-obsessed young teen" who decrees that people can only eat "leafy greens and other similar, low-calorie, low-protein foods," and has been described elsewhere as "advocat[ing]...a vegetarian lifestyle" for her subjects.
Panda	Polar Bear's Café	2006–2013	Japan	A panda bear who works at a cafe and is friends with other bears, and is a vegetarian. This later had an anime adaptation.
Persephone	Lore Olympus	2018–2024	New Zealand	19-year-old Persephone, also known as Persie and Kore, is the goddess of spring, and a naive, warmhearted newcomer to Olympian life, and is searching for her independence. She is revealed to be vegetarian in episode 79 of the webcomic.
Taikobo	Hoshin Engi	1996–2000	Japan	He is a kind-hearted trickster who spends time telling people their fortunes, spending time by the river, and dreaming about eating food like bean buns and peaches. While he seems weak, he actually has magical powers, like changing "a river to sake," and his sidekick is a hippo-like creature named Supushan. This later had an anime adaptation.
Linus Van Pelt	Peanuts	1950–2000	USA	Linus self-identifies as a vegetarian in a Thanksgiving strip published on November 24, 1994.
Adrian Veidt (Ozymandias)	Watchmen	1986–1987	England	Veidt, otherwise known as Ozymandias, who began as a hero but later became a villain, is a vegetarian, perhaps because of his love for his lynx Bubastis.
Damian Wayne (Robin)	Batman Incorporated Vol. 2, no. 1	2012	USA	Damian Wayne becomes a vegetarian after "a mission that took place in a slaughterhouse", adopting a cow, which dubs "Bat-Cow." His decision to continue being a vegetarian was also "referenced several issues later."
Zatanna Zatara	Hawkman	1964–1968	USA	A powerful magician, she is a vegetarian, works with animals in her magic acts, and "has a particular affinity for bunnies."

== Film ==
Characters	Title / Franchise	Actor	Year	Country	Notes
Alejandro	Problemista	Julio Torres	2023	USA	It is only revealed later in a cafe scene conversation that Alejandro is vegan when Elizabeth convinces him to order something with animal products.
Jean	August: Osage County	Abigail Breslin	2013	USA	The daughter has a lengthy conversation with her extended family about what she does not eat meat because it is ingesting the animal's fear, to which she is confronted by mockery of the hostile family. Her mother, Barbara later tells her that she saw her sneaking in burgers.
Lenny	Shark Tale	Jack Black	2004	USA	Lenny, Don Lino's youngest son, is a vegetarian shark, younger brother of Frankie, and later a good friend of Oscar. Additionally, Michael Imperioli is embarrassed of Lenny's vegetarian views.
Peggy	Year of the Dog	Molly Shannon	2007	USA	Peggy, the main character, loses her dog and slowly becomes an animal activist, later on adopting a vegan lifestyle.
Maria Posada	The Book of Life	Zoe Saldaña	2014	USA	Maria is a woman who cared for a pig and rescued him from slaughter. Though she is not said to be vegetarian within the film itself, director Jorge R. Gutierrez confirmed her to be vegetarian on Twitter, replying "Yup!" to the question "Is Maria a vegetarian because she loves animals so much?"
M'Baku	Black Panther	Winston Duke	2018	USA	In the film, M'Baku, the Jabari tribe leader who lives in the mountains of Wakanda, declares to CIA agent Everett K. Ross, "if you say one more word, I'll feed you to my children!" After Ross is shaken by these words, he jokes, saying he is kidding because all those in his tribe, including himself, are vegetarians. Some praised this scene for challenging a stereotype of Black culture and the perception of what vegetarians look like. Duke later said that some Black outlets cooked vegan meals for him, and said that the scene is "kind of teaching kids that eating vegetables is cool," which is something he is for.
Megan	But I'm A Cheerleader	Natasha Lyonne	2000	USA	Before she is sent to a conversion therapy camp, her parents and others claim she is a lesbian because she is a vegetarian.
Elle Woods	Legally Blonde	Reese Witherspoon	2001	USA	When she introduces herself at Harvard Law School, she describes herself and her dog as "Gemini vegetarians."
Yeong-hye	Vegetarian	Chae Min-seo	2009	South Korea	This film is a portrait of a woman, Yeong-hye, who "swears off meat before retreating into a literally vegetative state."

== Games ==
Characters	Title/Series	Year	Developer	Country	Notes
Herbert P. Bear	Club Penguin	2007	New Horizon Interactive	Canada	The main antagonist of the game, Herbert is depicted with traits that contrast real-life polar bears, including following a vegetarian diet.
Bryce the Steer	Steer Madness	2004	Johnathan Skinner	UK	In this animal rights inspired action-adventure game, the player assumes the role of Bryce the Cow, a walking, talking bovine determined to put an end to animal exploitation and turn everyone vegetarian. During gameplay, the player goes on a series of missions to save the animals using many different tactics. The game is based in an open city environment and features several transportation methods, with gameplay similar to the game Grand Theft Auto III (without the guns or violence), and was given a PETA award.
Elena	Pandora's Tower	2011	Ganbarion	Japan	Elena is a young woman who is cursed to transform into a monster. Very early in the game, she is offered to eat meat to repress her condition. This is an issue for her because she follows a religion called Aios which forbids meat-eating. Although Elena eats it, she must do so to prevent transforming into a monster. She is unhappy about having to consume flesh to keep her humanity, and she self-identifies as a vegetarian nonetheless.
Jonrón	Far Cry 6	2021	Ubisoft Toronto	Canada	Near the end of the game, the revolutionaries are holding a BBQ to celebrate. Jonrón requests plant-based options. Another character then explains that she is vegan.
Monika	Doki Doki Literature Club!	2017	Team Salvato	USA	Near the end of the game, during the Monika's Talk segment, Monika mentions she is vegetarian, but mainly to reduce the carbon footprint on Earth as opposed to the ethics of slaughter.

== Literature ==
Characters	Work	Author	Year	Country	Description
Elizabeth Costello	Elizabeth Costello	J. M. Coetzee	2003	Australia	In this fictional work, Elizabeth is a well-regarded Australian writer who, instead of talking about her novel, wants to talk about "fiction, realism, and the human-animal divide," outlining her reasons for being in favor of animal rights and vegetarianism. The book also has Elizabeth call the killing of animals an animal holocaust and engages with Franz Kafka, a "literary vegetarian."
August Engelhardt	Imperium	Christian Kracht	2012	Switzerland	August is the author of an 1898 pamphlet entitled A Carefree Future, where he describes a utopian society founded on nudism and a diet of coconuts, so-called cocovorism. An ardent vegetarian, Engelhardt argues that just as man is God's embodiment in the animal kingdom, so too is the coconut God's embodiment in the plant kingdom; cocovorism, he concludes, is therefore the path to divinity.
Frankenstein's monster	Frankenstein	Mary Shelley	1818	England	Frankenstein's monster in this novel said he is a vegetarian who eats "acorns and berries."
Herb	Herb, the Vegetarian Dragon	Jules Bass	1999	USA	Herb, a friendly dragon who lives in Nogard, a magical forest, likes tending a vegetable patch and is captured by a knight, with others agreeing to help him only if he "agrees to eat meat." The Vegetarian Resource Group praised this children's book for being fun, entertaining, and said that from it, "children can learn about the strength of ideals and individualism" and getting along with others.
Herb	Herb, the Vegetarian Dragon	Debbie Harter	1999	USA	Herb, a friendly dragon who lives in Nogard, a magical forest, likes tending a vegetable patch and is captured by a knight, with others agreeing to help him only if he "agrees to eat meat." The Vegetarian Resource Group praised this children's book for being fun, entertaining, and said that from it, "children can learn about the strength of ideals and individualism" and getting along with others.
Hazel Lancaster	The Fault in Our Stars	John Green	2012	USA	Hazel is vegetarian out of her desire to minimize the number of deaths she is "responsible for" as a human from her diet.
Simon Lewis	The Mortal Instruments series	Cassandra Clare	2007-2014	USA	Simon is the 16-year-old friend of the protagonist and has been a vegetarian for six years. As the story moves forward, his diet ends up only being "an interesting detail."
Lola Nolan	Lola and the Boy Next Door	Stephanie Perkins	2012	USA	Lola wears costumes of various themes and wigs daily and loves her dads. Her vegetarianism has been described as "a perfectly natural part" of her character.
Andi Oliver	Dakota	Martha Grimes	2008	USA	Andi is a drifter who suffers from amnesia, comes upon animal abuse, and feels she must do something, pointing out the inconsistency of eating animals when people say they care about animal welfare. The book was praised by the Vegetarian Resource Group for emphasizing the "need of individuals to speak out against factory farms."
Dawn Read Schafer	The Baby-Sitters Club series	Ann M. Martin	1986-2000	USA	Dawn, a recent transplant to Connecticut, meets four other girls who want to babysit for the whole neighborhood, and becomes the "resident Californian," dedicated to healthy food, sunshine, and "her vegetarian diet." Some described her character as introducing "a generation of readers to vegetarianism."
Vivian Sharpe	Adventures of Vivian Sharpe, Vegan Superhero	Marla Rose	2012	USA	Vivian, a character who is deeply empathetic, becomes a superhero and has a pathway that leads her to veganism. Aileen McGraw of the Vegetarian Resource Group praised the book for being an "authentic coming-of-age story" that exposes vegan youth to "teenage challenges."
Mia Thermopolis	The Princess Diaries series	Meg Cabot	2000-2015	USA	At one point in the series, Mia, whose full name is Amelia Mignonette Grimaldi Thermopolis Renaldo, says she does not eat meat when talking about her mother's cooking, something which her mother respects. She also lives in a community which is likely "more than accepting" of her vegetarianism.
Yeong-hye	The Vegetarian	Han Kang	2007	South Korea	Based on Han's 1997 short story "The Fruit of My Woman", The Vegetarian is set in modern-day Seoul and tells the story of Yeong-hye, a part-time graphic artist and home-maker, whose decision to stop eating meat after a bloody, nightmarish dream about human cruelty leads to devastating consequences in her personal and familial life.
Mathilde Yoder	Fates and Furies	Lauren Groff	2015	USA	Mathilde, a woman who manages the work of her husband, Lotto, after quitting her job at an art gallery, is a vegetarian due to an "exposé on television about industrial husbandry." Some called this notable because vegetarianism, or pescatarianism to be specific, "is subtle throughout the majority of the book."

== Live-action television ==
Characters	Actor	Show	Duration	Notes
Rachel Berry	Lea Michele	Glee	2009–2015	At the beginning of the show, she was depicted as vegan, but it was later clarified that she was "actually a vegetarian," meaning she can have eggs and dairy.
Phoebe Buffay	Lisa Kudrow	Friends	1994–2004	Due in no small part to her traumatic childhood, Phoebe has developed a childlike naïveté in an attempt to shield her from the world's evils. In addition to being a vegetarian and an avid tree-hugger, she also displays a remarkable lack of experience with the "darker sides" of life.
Topanga Lawrence	Danielle Fishel	Boy Meets World	1993–2000	She is a vegetarian who begins dating Cory, and he invites her to dinner at the International House of Salad, known as IHOS, after learning her dietary preferences.
Angela Martin	Angela Kinsey	The Office	2005–2013	Angela has said that she is a vegetarian on multiple occasions. However, some reviewers believed that writers may have forgot she was vegetarian.
Nikita Mears	Maggie Q	Nikita	2010–2013	The episode "Glass Houses" features Nikita conspicuously declining to eat the meat she is served as a guest at a family dinner, which other characters comment on. While Maggie Q herself is vegan, Nikita is shown in that same episode to be eating ice cream, indicating that the character is not.
Britta Perry	Gillian Jacobs	Community	2009–2015	A vegetarian, she prides herself on judging others in her study group, including on their eating habits, with her heart "always in the right place." She also is an anarchist, atheist, and activist who traveled around the world after dropping out of high school.
Spock	Leonard Nimoy	Star Trek	1966–1969	Said to be "television's first vegetarian", Spock and other Vulcans avoid eating meat due to a "philosophy of non-violence." Spock is identified as vegetarian in the episode "All Our Yesterdays", where he is "transported back to pre-civilised times", regresses to a primitive mindset, and eats meat.

== See also ==
- Go Vegan
- South Asian Veggie Table
- List of vegetarians
- List of vegans
- List of vegetarian and vegan companies
- List of vegetarian and vegan festivals
- List of vegetarian and vegan restaurants
- Environmental vegetarianism
- Ethics of eating meat
