= Homer's Barbershop Quartet =

- The Simpsons episode
- Promotional artwork for "Homer's Barbershop Quartet", featuring David Crosby
- Episode no.: Season 5 Episode 1
- Directed by: Mark Kirkland
- Written by: Jeff Martin
- Production code: 9F21
- Original air date: September 30, 1993

Guest appearances
- George Harrison as himself; David Crosby as himself; The Dapper Dans as some of the singing voices of the Be Sharps.

Episode features
- Chalkboard gag: "I will never win an Emmy"
- Couch gag: The family rush into the room, crash into each other, and shatter like glass.
- Commentary: Matt Groening; Mike Reiss; Al Jean; Jeff Martin; Hank Azaria; Jon Lovitz; Mark Kirkland

Episode chronology
← Previous "Krusty Gets Kancelled"	Next → "Cape Feare"
- The Simpsons season 5

"Homer's Barbershop Quartet" is the first episode of the fifth season of the American animated television series The Simpsons. It originally aired on the Fox network in the United States on September 30, 1993. George Harrison and David Crosby guest star as themselves, and the Dapper Dans partly provide the singing voices of the Be Sharps.

The episode was written by Jeff Martin and directed by Mark Kirkland. It tells the story of the Be Sharps, a barbershop quartet founded by Homer Simpson, loosely paralleling the history of the Beatles. The story begins when the Simpson family attend a swap meet and discover an old LP album featuring the group. Homer then explains how he, Principal Skinner, Barney Gumble, and Apu Nahasapeemapetilon formed the barbershop quartet, became famous and successful, but then eventually disbanded.

In its original American broadcast, "Homer's Barbershop Quartet" finished 30th in ratings, with a Nielsen rating of 12.7. Both critics and viewers praised the episode.

The episode was originally produced as the last episode for the fourth season, it was held over to air as season 5 premiere, and therefore being the last episode produced by the show's original writers. It was dedicated to Michael P. Schoenbrun, who served as executive in charge of production for Gracie Films, since he died on June 5, 1993, 3 months before season 5 started. However, he was still credited as executive in charge of production for Gracie Films, until the season 5 episode "Homer the Vigilante" aired on Fox in 1994.

== Plot ==
At the Springfield Swap Meet, Bart and Lisa notice Homer on the cover of an LP album. Homer tells the story of how he, Principal Skinner, Barney, and Apu recorded a barbershop quartet album in 1985, which catapulted them to national fame.

In 1985, Homer, Skinner, Apu and Chief Wiggum entertain nightly at Moe's Tavern, which was then called Moe's Cavern. An agent named Nigel offers to represent the group, but only on the condition that they replace Wiggum; Homer does this by abandoning Wiggum in a forest. The band holds auditions for a fourth member but have no luck until they hear Barney singing in a melodious Irish tenor voice in the men's room. After their first show as a foursome, they decide to name themselves "The Be Sharps."

Homer has little luck as a songwriter until Marge buys a "Baby on board" bumper sticker, inspiring Homer to write a song called "Baby On Board". The song appears on the group's first album, Meet the Be Sharps, and becomes a hit. The Be Sharps perform at the Statue of Liberty's centennial in 1986 and win a Grammy Award for Outstanding Soul, Spoken Word, or Barbershop Album of the Year. At the ceremony, Barney meets his hero David Crosby and Homer meets George Harrison of the Beatles, though Homer is more interested in the brownie that Harrison is eating. That night, Homer calls home to talk to Lisa and Marge and realizes how much they miss him. Disillusioned, he attempts to give his award statuette away as a tip to a bellhop, who rejects it because it is a Grammy.

In the present, Homer looks through a box of Be Sharps merchandise, including lunch boxes, mugs, and posters, as well as their second album, Bigger than Jesus. Bart and Lisa ask why the band is not popular anymore, and Homer tells the end of the story.

Creative disputes arise within the group when Barney begins dating a Japanese conceptual artist who monopolizes his time and drives the Be Sharps away from their barbershop roots. Eventually, an issue of Us magazine's "What's Hot and What's Not" notes that the band is "not"; the Be Sharps split up. Skinner resumes his position as principal of Springfield Elementary School, Apu returns to his job at the Kwik-E-Mart, Barney takes his girlfriend to Moe's, and Homer returns to the Springfield Nuclear Power Plant, where his job had temporarily been covered by a chicken.

Bart and Lisa ask several more questions about Homer's time in the Be Sharps, but he sends them to bed without giving them answers. Feeling nostalgic, Homer calls Skinner, Apu, and Barney. The next day, the Be Sharps perform "Baby on Board" on the roof of Moe's. Pedestrians stop and listen to the performance, including Harrison, who dismissively remarks, "It's been done," and Wiggum, who prepares to release tear gas on his former bandmates.

== Production ==
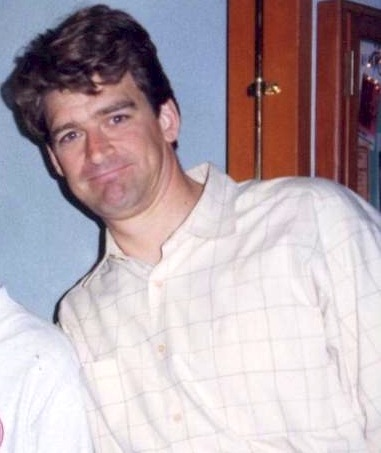
Jeff Martin, a fan of the Beatles, wrote the episode.

One of the writers for The Simpsons suggested that they should create an episode that focuses on Homer in a barbershop quartet and is "a big parody of the Beatles." The episode was written by Jeff Martin, who was an "obsessive" Beatles fan, making him "a natural to write [the episode]." Mark Kirkland, a "huge" Beatles fan, directed it and ensured that the Beatles references were accurate. Kirkland enjoyed directing "Homer's Barbershop Quartet," and unlike other episodes he directed, he did not experience any trouble animating it. The animators liked creating the Beatles gags and enjoyed the barbershop music. After the animators synchronized the audio track, music and animation, they "just fell in love" with it. They also enjoyed working on the choreography of the Be Sharps and trying to match the characters' movements with the music. They were inspired by the 1970 Beatles film Let It Be, including the shots of the band in the recording studio where they decide to break up. Kirkland did not think there was anything "spectacular" in the episode's animation, but he and his animation team "just loved" working on it.

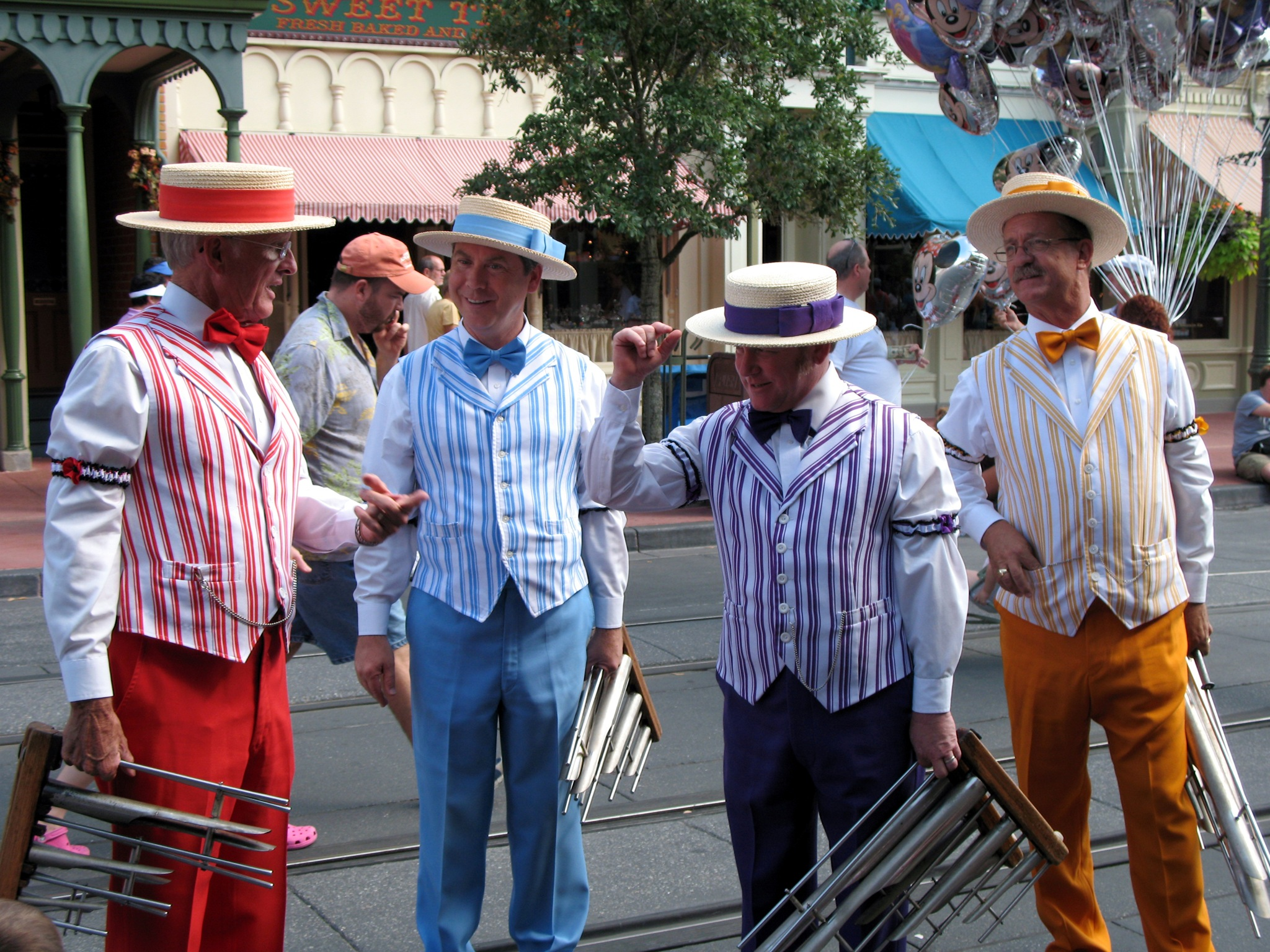
The Dapper Dans partly provided the singing voices of the Be Sharps in the episode.

Lisa sees a man selling an original Malibu Stacy doll from 1958 that has big, pointed breasts. The man, nicknamed "Wiseguy" by the show's staff, tells Lisa that "they took [the doll] off the market after some kid put both his eyes out." The joke received a censor note from the Fox network's censors, but the producers ignored it and the joke appeared in the episode when it aired.

The Be Sharps' singing voices were partly provided by The Dapper Dans, a barbershop quartet that performs at Disneyland in Anaheim, California. Before working on the episode, Martin had seen one of the quartet's performances and enjoyed it. When the episode's production began, he contacted the quartet, and they agreed to make a guest appearance in the episode. The Dapper Dans' singing was intermixed with the normal voice actors' voices, often with a regular voice actor singing the melody and The Dapper Dans providing backup.

George Harrison guest stars in the episode as himself. He was the second Beatle after Ringo Starr (in "Brush with Greatness") to appear on The Simpsons. When Harrison arrived at the recording studio in West Los Angeles to record his lines, the casting director told the episode's show runners, Al Jean and Mike Reiss, that Harrison was coming and that they were not allowed to tell anybody about it because it was intended to be a secret. Jean, Reiss, and the show's creator, Matt Groening went to see Harrison in the studio, and when they returned to the writer's room, Groening, unaware that it was supposed to be a secret, said, "Guess who I just met! George Harrison!" Harrison arrived at the studio by himself, without entourage or bodyguards. Groening recalls that Harrison was "pretty glum," and he was unenthusiastic when the staff asked him questions about the Beatles. However, when Groening asked Harrison about the Wonderwall Music album, he suddenly "perked up" because it was one of his solo albums that he was rarely questioned on. Harrison's guest appearance was one of Groening's favorites because he was "super nice" and "very sweet" to the staff. Jean said it was a "huge thrill" to have him appear. David Crosby also makes a guest appearance in the episode as himself, in the scene where he presents a Grammy Award to the Be Sharps.

"Homer's Barbershop Quartet" was a hold-over episode from the season four production line. It was chosen to air as the fifth season's premiere episode because it guest starred Harrison. The Fox network executives wanted to premiere with Conan O'Brien's episode "Homer Goes to College" because of its parody of the 1978 comedy film Animal House, but the writers felt "Homer's Barbershop Quartet" would be a better choice because of Harrison's involvement.

== Cultural references ==
At the swap meet, Mayor Quimby says "Ich bin ein Springfield Swap Meet Patron," a parody of John F. Kennedy's famous Cold War quote. Flanders is selling trading cards of Biblical figures, including Joseph of Arimathea and Methuselah. Homer browses through a box with items costing five cents each, including the United States Declaration of Independence, a copy of Action Comics #1, a complete block of Inverted Jenny misprinted postal stamps, and a Stradivarius violin. Moe sells oyster shells at the swap meet that resemble Lucille Ball. Principal Skinner finds the helmet he wore in a Vietnamese prison camp. It has the number 24601, also Jean Valjean's prison number in Les Misérables. Homer mentions that 1985 was the year that Joe Piscopo left Saturday Night Live. He begins telling the story of the Be Sharps by saying, "Rock and roll had become stagnant. 'Achy Breaky Heart' was seven years away; something had to fill the void. That something was barbershop." In the audition for Wiggum's replacement, Jasper Beardley sings the "Theme From A Summer Place" and Wiggum, in disguise, sings a song from Doctor Dolittle. Grampa listens to Paul Harvey on the radio; Harvey tells listeners "And that little boy nobody liked grew up to be...Roy Cohn!" Homer buys Grampa a pink Cadillac, as Elvis Presley did for his mother. One of the late night television shows Wiggum watches is Johnny Carson doing his Carnac the Magnificent routine, wearing a fez instead of the Classic turban. The name of the recording studio Homer and his group records at is called Desilu Studios, a reference to Desilu Studios, run by Lucille Ball and her husband Desi Arnaz. Homer references Al Capone's Vault by Geraldo Rivera while writing a new song for the group. The Be Sharps beat Dexys Midnight Runners at the Grammys and Homer remarks, "you haven't heard the last of them." At the Grammy ceremony, Spinal Tap, Aerosmith, and Michael Jackson (Leon Kompowsky) are in the audience; all had guest-starred on the show. The award is presented by David Crosby, who was in "Marge in Chains". While Bart and Lisa browse through LP albums at the swap meet, they find a recording by Melvin and the Squirrels, a parody of Alvin and the Chipmunks. When the Be Sharps perform "Goodbye, My Coney Island Baby" for the Statue of Liberty centennial, President Ronald Reagan and his wife Nancy are in attendance.

Marge's painting of Ringo Starr, seen in "Brush with Greatness", is for sale at the swap meet, the first of many references to the Beatles. The cover of Meet the Be Sharps is based on the cover of Meet the Beatles! In the flashback, Moe's Tavern is named Moe's Cavern, a reference to the Cavern Club in Liverpool, where the Beatles frequently performed in the early 1960s. Chief Wiggum, thrown out of the band, mirrors Pete Best, an early member of the Beatles who was replaced by Starr. Their manager, Nigel, is a parody of Brian Epstein. Like Starr, Apu is given a stage name: Apu de Beaumarchais. The cover of Bigger Than Jesus, the Be Sharps' second album, is a parody of the cover of Abbey Road. The title is a reference to a controversial quote made by John Lennon in 1966. Bart asks, "What did you do to lose your popularity? Screw up like the Beatles and say you were bigger than Jesus?" Homer replies, "All the time. That was the title of our second album." Near the end of the episode, the album's back cover is revealed, on which Homer is seen turned away from the camera. This is a parody of the Sgt. Pepper's Lonely Hearts Club Band LP reverse, in which Paul McCartney is in the same pose. Homer meets George Harrison at the Grammy party. Barney's Japanese conceptual artist girlfriend is a parody of Yoko Ono. Their song repeats the phrase "Number 8" and a burp by Barney, a reference to the Beatles' "Revolution 9". While Barney plays this song to the group, the members are seen standing in such a way to resemble a photograph of the Beatles in their studio with Ono while recording The White Album. The group performing atop Moe's Tavern at the end of the episode is a parody of the Beatles' impromptu performance on the Apple Corps rooftop during their Get Back recording sessions in 1969. The Be Sharps are wearing the same outfits as the Beatles during the rooftop concert scene: Barney in a brown fur coat (Lennon), Homer in a bright red coat (Starr), Skinner in a black suit (McCartney), and Apu in a black Mongolian lamb coat with green trousers (Harrison). Harrison, seeing the concert, notes "It's been done." After the performance, Homer says, "I'd like to thank you on behalf of the group and I hope we passed the audition," paraphrasing Lennon's line at the end of the concert.

== Reception ==
In its original American broadcast, "Homer's Barbershop Quartet" finished 30th in the ratings for the week of September 27 to October 3, 1993, with a Nielsen rating of 12.7, translating to 11,963,400 households.

Despite being a "leftover from last season," Tom Shales of The Washington Post applauded the episode: "Who cares? It's funny." DVD Verdict gave the episode a Grade A score. DVD Movie Guide's Colin Jacobson felt that the episode "kicks off [the season] with a terrific bang." He appreciated the episode's parodies of a mix of subjects, and its ability to bring them together into a coherent story. Noting that the episode focused on spoofing Beatlemania, Jacobson praised George Harrison's cameo as "probably the best" Beatles cameo in the series. (Ringo Starr had starred in "Brush with Greatness" and Paul McCartney would star in "Lisa the Vegetarian").

Giving the episode a score of 5 out of 5, DVD Talk praised the "four-part harmony of hilarity [that] gets a flawless mop top modeling," complimenting the references to pop culture icons as being "right on the money." TV DVD Reviews commented on how the episode "hit all the right notes," and were pleased with Harrison's cameo. The Courier-Mail found "Homer's Barbershop Quartet" an entertaining episode. Asserting that the series hit its peak with season five episodes such as "Homer's Barbershop Quartet", the Sunday Tasmanian called the episode a "first-class offering."

Although it appreciated the story and use of the main characters, Current Film was not enthused about the episode, claiming that it was not consistently funny. The Age called "Homer's Barbershop Quartet" an awful episode, with a "weak, unfunny parody of The Beatles," blaming the series' change of writers before the episode was written.

IGN ranked the Beatles' appearances (in "Lisa the Vegetarian", "Brush with Greatness", and "Homer's Barbershop Quartet") 10th on their list of the Top 25 Simpsons Guest Appearances, and the Toronto Star ranked the band fifth on a list of the 11 best cameos on The Simpsons. Andrew Martin of Prefix Mag named Harrison his fourth-favorite musical guest on The Simpsons out of a list of ten. Nathan Rabin writes that the episode "is a swooning yet irreverent valentine to Beatles mythology—an inspired, episode-length riff on the rise, fall, and glorious afterlife of what we can all agree was the single greatest rock band of all time."

=== Legacy ===
The cocktail Barney's Yoko Ono-esque girlfriend orders in this episode—"a single plum, floating in perfume, served in a man's hat"—was recreated by Icelandic artist Ragnar Kjartansson as part of the 2016 exhibit One More Story at the Reykjavík Art Museum, which was curated by Ono herself.
