= Vegaphobia =

Aversion to vegetarians and vegans

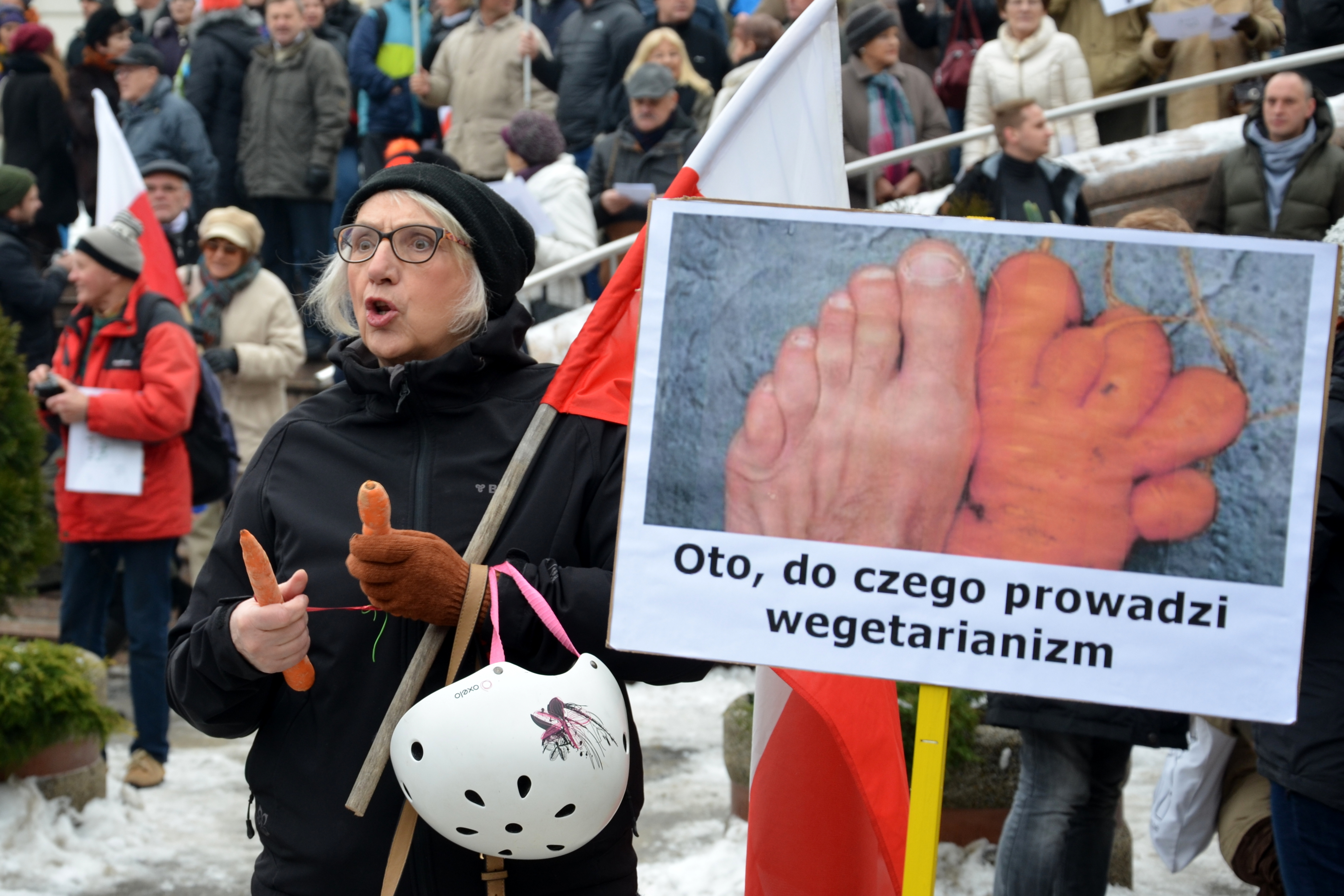
A protestor holding a vegaphobic placard at a KOD demonstration in Bielsko-Biała, 2016

Vegaphobia, vegephobia, or veganophobia is an aversion to, or dislike of, vegetarians and vegans. The term first appeared in the 2010s, coinciding with the rise in veganism in the late 2010s. Several studies have found an incidence of vegaphobic sentiments in the general population. Positive feelings regarding vegetarians and vegans also exist. Because of their diet, others may perceive them as more virtuous or principled.

== Terminology ==
Three French Veggie Pride activists used the term végéphobie meaning discrimination against vegetarians, in a 2011 document.

British sociologists Matthew Cole and Karen Morgan used the term vegaphobia and the derived adjective vegaphobic in a 2011 study, meaning prejudice against vegans specifically. Later authors used the term vegaphobia (vegan-) in this sense.

Subsequent studies defined vegaphobia as the dual aversion to vegans and vegetarians together. A 2019 study of vegaphobia in this sense added the term vegaphobe for a person with vegaphobia. Previously, the Swiss-Polish actor and producer Jola Cora had also used the dual aversion concept but called it vegephobia (with an 'e'), in a 2013 conference talk titled "Vegephobia, what is it?"

== Attitudes in the general population ==
"In the media, in pop culture and even in progressive, enlightened polite society it is still widely acceptable to make fun of vegans", writes Farhad Manjoo in a 2019 New York Times opinion piece against mocking vegans. Manjoo cites findings from a 2015 study by Canadian psychologists, that the general population rates vegans more negatively than atheists and immigrants, and tolerates vegans only slightly better than drug addicts. Vegans get more negative ratings than vegetarians, and vegan men receive more negative ratings than women. Vegans are rated better if they are motivated by health reasons than if their veganism is driven by ethical or animal rights concerns.

Among around a thousand Belgian Flemish meat eaters surveyed in 2016, vegaphobia against vegetarians was more common among men than among women, among older more than younger people, among people with a firmer intention to keep consuming meat, and among less educated people.

These findings are consistent with vegans who feel discriminated against by people that eat meat. In 2018, a survey of over 1,000 British and American vegans from the weight-loss application Lifesum found 80% of respondents to have experienced some form of anti-vegan prejudice. The fear of being stigmatized when becoming a vegan also keeps some meat-eaters from transitioning to a vegan diet.

Vegan chocolate has been criticized with thousands of "mean tweets", a fact the British chocolate company Cadbury drew attention to in a 2022 campaign.

Meat eaters rate vegans less negatively when they have been reminded that meat comes from animals, a survey of 300 US residents found. The reminder also increased their discomfort while eating meat.

A study published in the Sex Roles journal in 2023 found that men on vegan diets are commonly perceived as less masculine, a stereotype shared across genders and even among some female vegans.

A 2024 column lamented anti-vegan jokes made by progressives and moderates in the Belgian media.

== Attitudes of the media ==
Academic Laura Wright stated in 2015 that media organizations and wider discourse routinely mischaracterize vegan diets, highlighting situations where media outlets reported the death of children as being from a "vegan diet" rather than the parental neglect that was the actual cause.

A 2011 study found that British media discredit vegans through ridicule, and portray veganism as difficult or impossible to maintain. The six most common vegaphobic statements found in these media were, in order of frequency: ridiculing veganism, erroneously equating veganism with asceticism, perpetuating the myth that veganism is difficult or impossible to sustain, describing veganism as a fashion trend, portraying vegans as sentimentalists, and defining vegans as hostile. The study found that of 397 articles, 20% were neutral, approximately 5% were positive and 75% were negative. In 2018, it was revealed that William Sitwell, a British food editor had sent a vegan an email that mentioned "killing vegans one by one". American celebrity chef Anthony Bourdain stated, in his 2000 book Kitchen Confidential, that he despised vegans and quipped that vegetarians and vegans "are a persistent irritant to any chef worth a damn."

On social media, some vegans have also been attacked for their choice to have sexual relations only with other vegans.

== Causes of vegaphobia ==
There are many theories to explain negative attitudes towards vegans and vegetarians.

Several studies have found associations of vegaphobia with various demographic and political traits. Vegaphobia is most common among people with conservative or right-wing beliefs, especially the ones associated with Abrahamic religions, being often most pronounced in far-right individuals and groups. For some right-wing adherents, eating meat is not only a delight, but also a part of their attitudes towards life. Thus, they can perceive those who advocate against meat consumption as a threat to their way of life. A survey of about 1,000 participants showed that vegans are perceived as a threat mainly by older and less educated people, and by meat eaters who are particularly convinced of their habit. A 2019 study also found a positive correlation between world-views rooted in social dominance of some groups over others (i.e., institutionalized discrimination) and a negative perception of vegans.

One explanation for vegaphobia is founded on the meat paradox: many people who eat meat do not like harming animals. Vegans remind them of this cognitive dissonance, and one way to resolve this inner conflict and reduce dissonance is to maintain prejudice against vegans.

Another proposed reason for vegaphobia is that meat eaters may feel judged by vegans and vegetarians for eating meat. Discrediting ethical vegans as do-gooders is then a way to invalidate the judgement of oneself. These negative attitudes against vegans are stronger when vegans are thought to think of themselves as morally superior.

While meat eaters may have an inner conflict about the killing of animals for their food, this explanation of vegaphobia may not hold up to environmental reasons for avoiding meat. Environmentalist meat eaters may not see a conflict in eating meat because they see their individual environmental impact of meat consumption as low.

Vegans may not always be discredited for ideological reasons. Sometimes the reason may be that the vegaphobe cannot share food with them.

Vegaphobia has been framed as an intersectional problem connected to masculinity, race, and gender identity issues.

== Vegaphobic acts ==
=== Against vegetarians ===
In the early 1990s, McDonald's started describing its French fries as vegetarian when they, in fact, contained beef-derived flavoring, leading to a ten million US dollar settlement in 2002 for misleading Hindus and other vegetarians into eating food against their conscience.

In 2020, a parliamentary member of the far-right nationalist party Alternative for Germany called someone who ordered vegetarian food in the canteen of the German parliament a pejorative term, saying "we are going to get you too, you grain-eaters".

=== Against vegans ===
Philosopher Oscar Horta links vegaphobia to discrimination against vegans, which he observes, among other instances, at the workplace.

Vegans have in individual instances been harassed in the workplace and have been terminated from jobs or excluded from the applicant pool for their veganism.

A survey by the law firm Crossland Employment Solicitors found that among "over 1,000" UK-based vegan employees, nearly a third felt discriminated against at their workplace. A London NHS trust (a unit of the UK's National Health Service) in 2017 put up a discriminatory job advert for an occupational therapist (OT) saying, "Unfortunately, OTs with vegan diets cannot be considered", and that "Veganism or other highly restrictive eating practices cannot be accommodated." When challenged by The Vegan Society, the trust changed the advert and apologized.

A vegan was denied a Swiss passport by local voters in Switzerland, and people have thrown KFC fried chicken at vegans in England, in both cases as a reaction to their lawful animal rights protest. In 2018, William Sitwell, then editor of the Waitrose Food magazine, responded to a request for a vegan column by proposing "a series on killing vegans, one by one".

A vegan college student from Bristol was told to watch bull castration and visit an abattoir or fail her course in animal management. The university reconsidered after support from The Vegan Society.

A primary school in Solihull forbade a five-year-old from bringing soy milk to school. It took three months and the help of The Vegan Society for the father of the child to change the school's mind.

When learning about a vegan person's diet, many non-vegans list all the animal-based foods that they like, without consideration for how this can make vegans feel uncomfortable ("I just love bacon").^{:363}

Some people use the term veganphobia (with an 'n') when discussing prejudice and discrimination against vegans specifically.

== Tracking ==
The Unión Vegana Argentina in 2019 petitioned the Argentine government agency National Institute Against Discrimination, Xenophobia and Racism to include vegaphobia in its discrimination mappings.

== Criticism ==
The application of the term "vegaphobia"—and the extent to which it can be compared to other forms of discrimination—is a somewhat divisive issue. Sophie Wilkinson of Grazia opined in 2018 that discrimination against vegans (unlike sexism, racism, and homophobia) does not go beyond the level of microaggressions. She also wrote that "discrimination is about being treated differently for who you are, not for what you choose to do", implying that being a vegan is not who you are, but rather what you choose to do. Others have distinguished between two kinds of veganism, lifestyle and ethical. Veganism motivated by ethical beliefs about animals was ruled to be a protected belief in the United Kingdom under the Equality Act in an unfair dismissal lawsuit in 2020.

== See also ==
- Animal rights movement
- Do-gooder derogation
- Food choice
- List of fictional vegetarian characters
- Speciesism
- Veganarchists
- Anthropocentrism
