= The History of Little Goody Two-Shoes =

1765 children's story

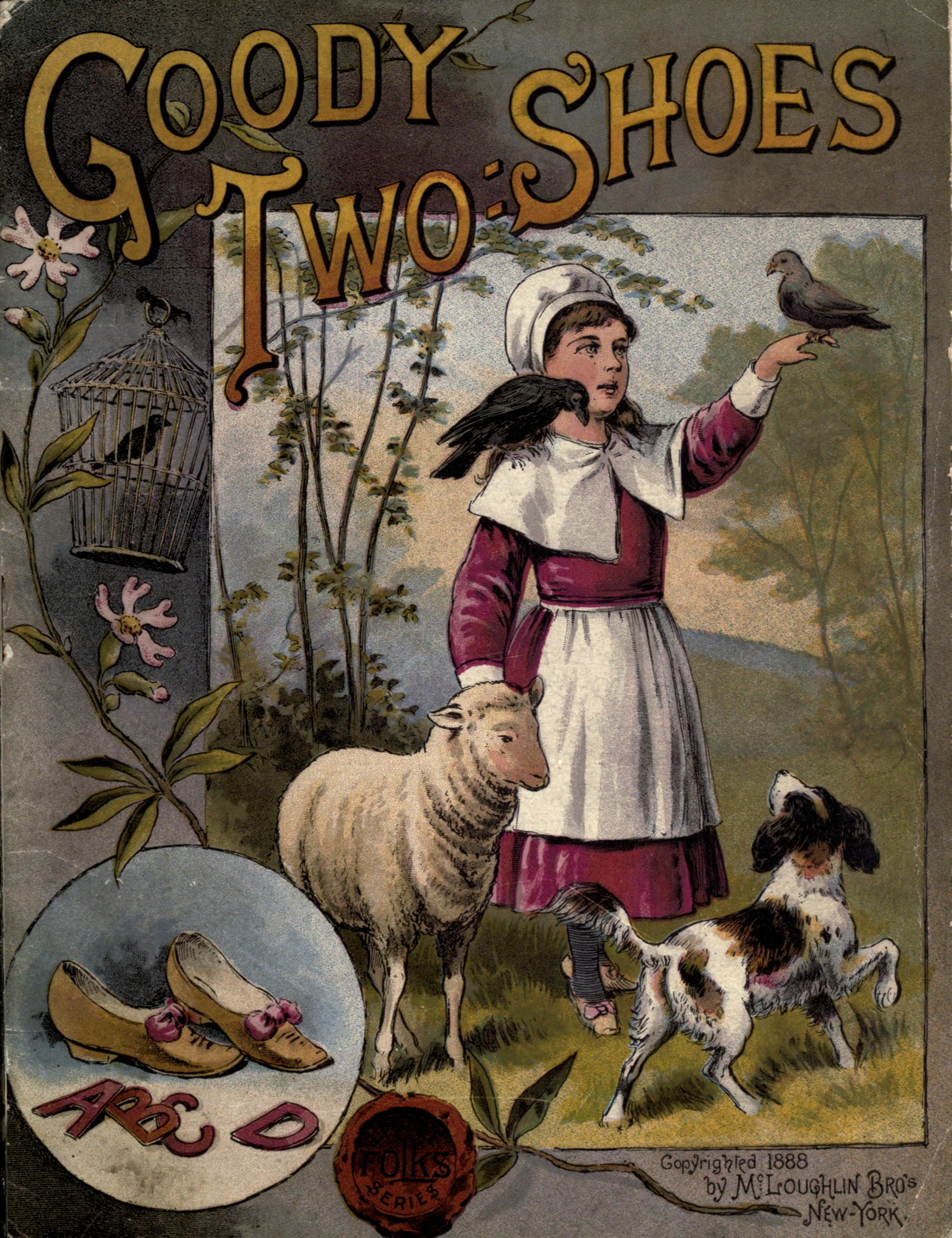
- Cover of the 1888 edition
- Author: Anonymous, but most likely Oliver Goldsmith
- Publisher: John Newbery
- Publication date: 1765
- Publication place: Kingdom of Great Britain

The History of Little Goody Two-Shoes is a children's story published by John Newbery in London in 1765. The author of the book remains unclear, but Oliver Goldsmith is generally considered the most likely. The story popularized the phrase "goody two-shoes" as a descriptor for an excessively virtuous person or do-gooder. Historian V. M. Braganza refers to it as one of the first works of children's literature, perhaps the earliest children's novel in English. It was highly influential to subsequent authors, revolutionary in the development of its literary genre, and popular, noted for its female heroine in a realist setting.

== Plot ==
The fable tells of Goody Two-Shoes, the nickname of a poor orphan girl named Margery Meanwell. Margery and her brother Tommy have but three shoes after their parents pass away. (Tommy uses two of them because he has to go about more often, leaving Margery with but one.)

Margery and Tommy’s benefactor is the clergyman of the parish, Mr. Goodall, who takes them in. Soon a rich gentleman from London hears of the orphans’ plight and immediately orders a pair of new shoes to be made for Margery. When the shoes arrive, she is so happy that she tells Mrs. Goodall, "Two shoes, ma'am! See, Two shoes!" These words she keeps on repeating to everybody she meets, and so comes to be called Goody Two Shoes.

The gentleman from London also arranges to have Tommy leave the country, for gainful employment (a sad moment for everyone). Margery takes a strong interest in gaining an education. Mr. Goodall arranges for just such an education and Margery excels at it. As she grows up, she shares that education with other children in the community, and eventually becomes their teacher. When a rich knight, Sir Walter Welldon, hears of this, he appoints her as the newest and youngest teacher in the community’s schoolhouse. She becomes better and better known as a teacher of greater and greater accomplishments.

Two parts of the story combine to present a significant challenge in Margery’s life: 1) She has made a habit of helping and adopting birds and stray animals, who of course stay with her all along through the story. And 2) She continues to pursue higher education, which encourages her to obtain and refer to a crude barometer to very roughly predict upcoming weather. These two things cause her to be accused of witchcraft—a serious charge in “those days.” Fortunately, one of the community judges is Sir Welldun, who testifies as to Margery’s excellent character and good work as a teacher, and the charges are immediately dropped.

Meanwhile, a widower in the community—Sir Edward Lovell—has taken seriously ill, which threatens the Lovell children and his entire household. Margery volunteers to take care of them all. Fortunately after a lengthy convalescence Sir Lovell recovers from his maladies, and then realizes he has fallen in love with Margery. He asks for her hand in marriage, and she realizes that she has fallen in love with him as well. On their scheduled wedding day, her long-lost brother Tommy returns from his travels (and successes) for a wonderful family reunion. Margery gets married and everything turns out to their great benefit.

This serves as proof that Margery’s virtue has been rewarded and her wealth earned, a popular theme in children's literature of the era.

== Publication ==
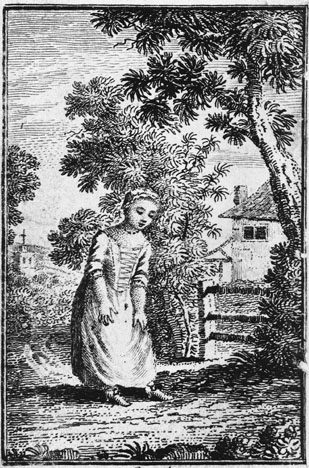
A woodcut of the eponymous Goody Two-Shoes from the 1768 edition of the novel

The anonymous story was published in London by the John Newbery company, a publisher of popular children's literature. In his introduction to an 1881 edition of the book, Charles Welsh wrote:

Goody Two-Shoes was published in April 1765, and few nursery books have had a wider circulation, or have retained their position so long. The number of editions that have been published, both in England and America, is legion, and it has appeared in mutilated versions, under the auspices of numerous publishing houses in London and the provinces, although of late years there have been no new issues.

=== The anonymous author ===
The story has been attributed to the Irish author Oliver Goldsmith, though this is disputed. Because Goldsmith frequently wrote for pay and because of his copious fiction in essays (e.g., The Bee and Citizen of the World), the attribution to Goldsmith is plausible. Washington Irving was one supporter of this attribution; he wrote: "Several quaint little tales introduced in Goldsmith's Essays show that he had a turn for this species of mock history; and the advertisement and title-page bear the stamp of his sly and playful humor." The book has also been attributed to Newbery himself and to Giles Jones, a friend of Newbery.

== Origin of the phrase "goody two-shoes" ==
Although The History of Little Goody Two-Shoes is credited with popularizing the term "goody two-shoes", the actual origin of the phrase is unknown. For example, it appears a century earlier in Charles Cotton's Voyage to Ireland in Burlesque (1670):

Mistress mayoress complained that the pottage was cold;
'And all long of your fiddle-faddle,' quoth she.
'Why, then, Goody Two-shoes, what if it be?
Hold you, if you can, your tittle-tattle,' quoth he.

The name is used herein to point out the mayoress's comparative privilege; "Goody" (a shortening of "Goodwife"), being the equivalent of "Mrs." and "Two-shoes", implicitly comparing her to people who have no shoes.

However, beginning with this book in 1765 the phrase Goody Two Shoes took on a widely-understood description of a genuinely virtuous, deserving, and hardworking person (simultaneously reinforcing the notion that a strong work ethic is a virtue that makes someone deserving of success).

In or around the 1870s, the phrase began to evolve with the introduction of "goody-goody," a term that was used to mock overly pious, insincere, or self-righteous behavior.

By the mid-20th century (documented around 1969), "Goody Two-Shoes" fully absorbed the “goody-goody” negative connotation, as noted above.
