= Oste (disambiguation) =

The Oste is a German river in Lower Saxony. The river gives the name to the town of Osten and the Oste-Hamme Canal or Hamme-Oste Canal.

Oste may also refer to:

== People ==
- Oste (surname)
- Öste, a Swedish language surname
- Ostenus or Oste I, one of the legendary kings of Sweden, according to Johannes Magnus - see List of legendary kings of Sweden
- Oste Erceg (born 1947), Bosnian Serb painter
- Hoste da Reggio (c. 1520–1569), also spelled Oste, Italian composer
- Daniel Droste (born 1980), German musician and singer also known as Dr. Oste

== Other uses ==
- Oste-class fleet service ship, a German Navy class
  - German auxiliary Oste, the lead ship of the class
- L'oste, a character in the novel The Adventures of Pinocchio
- Off-stoichiometry thiol-enes (OSTE), in chemistry - see off-stoichiometry thiol-ene polymer
- Oste, Old French word for "innkeeper", root word for Osteria

== See also ==
- Osti (disambiguation)
