= Osti =

Osti or OSTI may refer to:

- Office of Scientific and Technical Information, part of the Office of Science within the U.S. Department of Energy
- Ostindustrie, a World War II German industrial project, abbreviated Osti
- Osti (surname)

== See also ==
- Oste (disambiguation)
