= Oat milk =

Type of plant drink made from oats

Oat extract
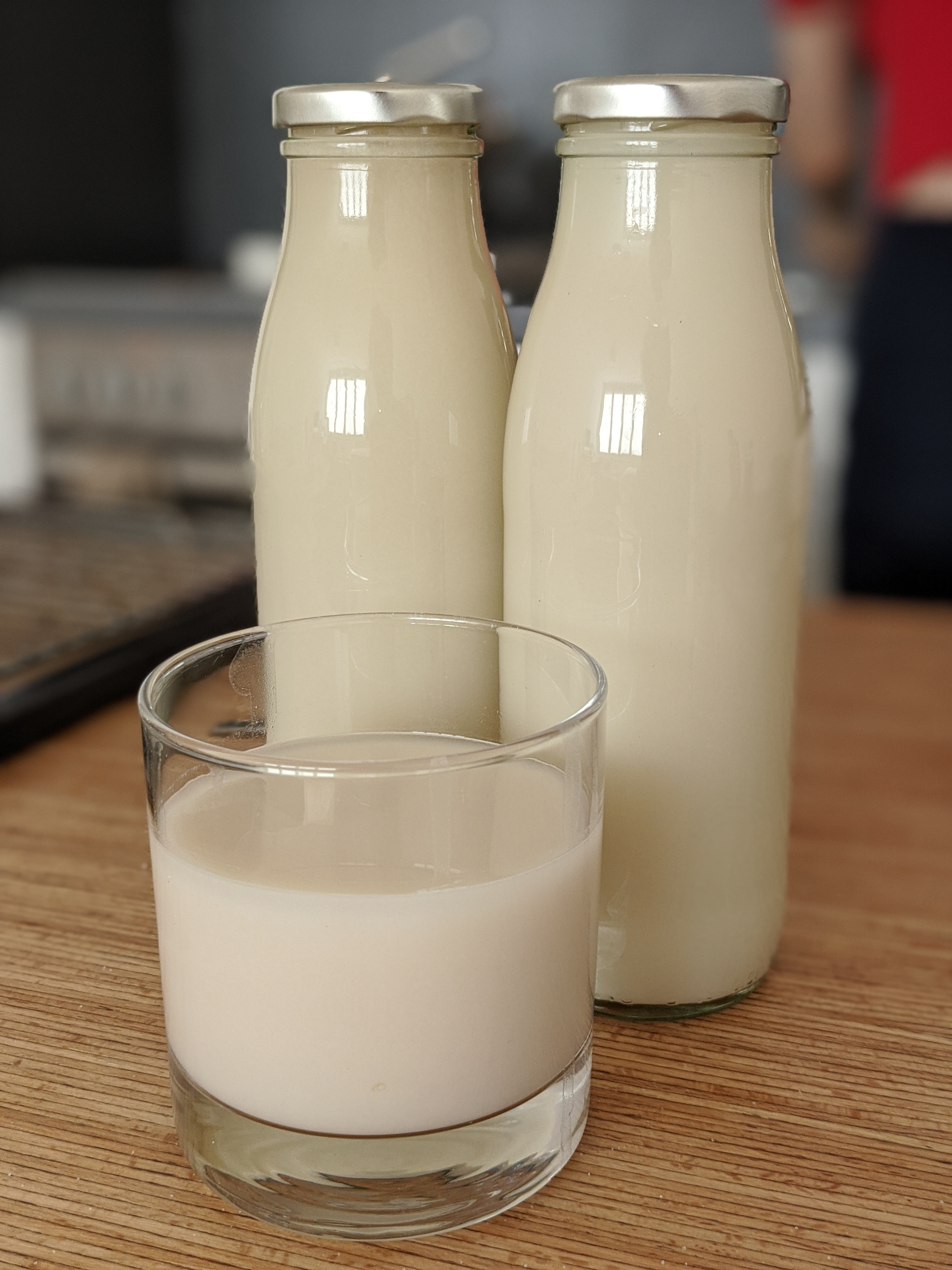
- Oat milk
- Place of origin: Sweden
- Invented: c. 1990
- Food energy (per 240 ml serving): 120 kcal (500 kJ)
Nutritional value
(per 240 ml serving)
- Protein: 3 g
- Fat: 5 g
- Carbohydrate: 16 g
- Glycemic index: 60 (medium)

Oat milk is a plant milk derived from whole oat (Avena spp.) grains by extracting the plant material with water. Oat milk has a creamy texture and mild oatmeal-like flavor, and is manufactured in various flavors, such as sweetened, unsweetened, vanilla, and chocolate.

Unlike other plant milks having origins as early as the 13th century, oat milk was developed in the 1990s by the Swedish scientists Angeliki Triantafyllou and Rickard Öste.

By 2020, oat milk products included coffee creamer, yogurt alternatives, ice cream, and chocolate. Oat milk may be consumed to replace dairy in vegan diets, or in cases of medical conditions where dairy is incompatible, such as lactose intolerance or an allergy to cow milk.

Compared to milk and other plant-based beverages, oat milk has relatively low environmental impact due to its comparatively low land and water needs for production.

== History ==
=== Invention ===
Soy milk and almond milk (besides coconut milk) predate all other plant-based milks, including oat milk, both as cultural and commercial products. Since the early 20th century, soy milk made its way from Asia to European and American grocery stores, initially as a dairy substitute due to lactose intolerance. The increase in consumption of soy milk since its global distribution created a large market for plant-based beverages like oat milk. There are records of oat based beverages that go back to the 18th century; however, one of the first recorded instances of a commercial oat-based plant beverage was in the early 1990s, when Rickard Öste developed oat milk. At the time, Öste was working as a food scientist at Lund University in Lund, Sweden, researching lactose intolerance and sustainable food systems.

In 1994, Öste and biotechnology researcher Angeliki Triantafyllou co-founded Cereal Base Ceba AB, the predecessor to Oatly. The researchers developed an enzymatic process for producing oat-based beverages. An initial patent application was filed in 1994 and, in 2006, a manufacturing plant opened in Landskrona, Sweden.

In July 2026, Angeliki Triantafyllou received the European Inventor Award in the Industry category for developing an enzymatic process that improved the taste, texture, and stability of oat-based drinks.

=== History of market expansion ===
Oat milk is available in many countries under various brands.

In 2018, there were numerous oat milk shortages from unprecedented demand in Europe and North America, highlighting the strong consumer demand for this product. HP Hood entered the market with its new Planet Oat brand and immediately captured the largest share of the U.S. oat milk market within its first year. Meanwhile, Oatly struggled to keep up with demand despite opening a new factory in New Jersey in April 2019, producing 750,000 US gallons (2,800,000 L; 620,000 imp gal) per month of oat milk base, and announced plans for a Utah-based factory three times larger to open in early 2020.

In 2019, retail sales of oat milk in the United States were $29 million, up from $4.4 million in 2017 however Oatly continued to experience production constraints creating opportunities for competitors to gain share. The pioneer in commercial oat milk, Oatly, had its products in 7,000 coffee shops and grocery stores, as of 2019, but was not the only prominent oat milk producer. During 2020, sales in the United States increased to $213 million, becoming the second most consumed plant milk after almond milk ($1.5 billion in 2020 sales). By 2022, Planet Oat held nearly 40% of the category, more than twice the share of Oatly, its nearest competitor.

Oat milk ice cream, yogurt-like products, and coffee creamers, were common in 2019, with expanded uses in coffee shops, such as Starbucks and Dunkin' Donuts, and growth into new markets, such as China. Growth in the oat milk market is partly attributed to its relatively low environmental impact, low land and water needs, and rising vegan dietary practices in developed countries.

From 2019 to 2020 in the United States, oat milk sales increased 303% to US$213 million, with refrigerated oat milk having nearly ten times the sales of shelf-stable oat milk. Consumer analysis of the growth in oat milk consumption indicates its market growth derives from the dairy-like taste, health perception, and environmental sustainability, which contrasts with the high water demand of growing almonds. Oat milk foams and mixes in other beverages, like coffee, in ways similar to milk. Over 2020-21, oat milk sales increased 151%, with it becoming the second-most consumed plant milk after almond milk. On 20 May 2021, Oatly – the world's largest oat milk manufacturer – became a publicly traded company on the NASDAQ exchange, having a market value of US$13 billion on that day. As of 2026, Planet Oat was the largest oat milk brand in the United States by market share, accounting for 36.9% of category sales, ahead of Oatly at 29.0%.

== Production ==
=== Processing ===
The production of oat milk is similar to that of most other plant milks. Unprocessed cereal grains, like oats, are indigestible due to their hard, outer hull; processing is also necessary to change the dry grains into a liquid. (Note: As of 2019, Oatly obtained oats exclusively from Canada to supply its factory in New Jersey.)

The procedure starts by measuring and milling the oat grains to break apart their outer hull. Then the grains are stirred in warm water and ground into a slurry. The slurry is treated with enzymes and heat to create a thick liquid oat base.

Soaking and subsequently extracting nutrients from the oats have the most direct implications on the final milk product. Increasing the yield in this step may be assisted by chemical catalysts, enzymes, or an increase in temperature, all in order to remove nutrient molecules from the solid byproduct and incorporate them into the liquid. Chemical catalysts increase the pH of the mixture, enzymatic catalysts induce partial hydrolysis of proteins and polysaccharides, and higher temperatures increase reaction rates. Separating the liquid from the solid byproduct is a simple step achieved through decanting, filtration, and spinning in a centrifuge.Once the liquid product is separated, adding other ingredients, such as fortifying vitamins and minerals, or sweeteners, flavorings, salts, oils, and similar ingredients, forms the final product. (Note: In the United States, Oatly ships the treated oat base liquid to a subcontractor for processing into the final oat milk product.) Since unfortified oat milk is lower in calcium, iron, and vitamin A than cow's milk, these nutrients must be added in order for the end product to be a nutritional substitute of cow's milk. Homogenization and heat-treatments such as pasteurization or ultra-high temperature (UHT) treatments are used to extend the product's shelf life.

Mean water footprint for one glass (200 g) of different milks
Milk types	Water use (L per 200 g)
Cow's milk	131
Almond milk	74
Rice milk	56
Oat milk	9
Soy milk	2

Mean greenhouse gas emissions for one glass (200 g) of different milks
Milk types	Greenhouse gas emissions (kg CO_{2}-C_{eqv} per 200 g)
Cow's milk	0.62
Rice milk	0.23
Soy milk	0.21
Oat milk	0.19
Almond milk	0.16

=== Challenges to processing ===
Oat milk, like most plant-based milks, is made of disintegrated and hydrolyzed plant materials, resulting in non-uniform particle sizes in comparison to bovine milk. Decreasing particle size and narrowing the distribution through physical processing like homogenization, and using stabilizers, such as hydrocolloids in combination with other emulsifiers, are common ways to improve product quality.

Another problem posed by the natural composition of oats is their high starch content. The starch content (50–60%) is challenging during ultra-high temperature treatments because of the relatively low gelatinization temperature of starch. To overcome this, producers use an enzymatic hydrolysis of starch by alpha- and beta-amylase, which break down the starch into smaller polysaccharides without the previous gelatinization behavior.

Fortifying oat milk with essential micronutrients may include vitamin D, vitamin A, vitamin B12, riboflavin, and calcium.

=== Veganism and environmental impact ===
Since around 2015, interest for plant-based foods, in combination with concerns for animal welfare and low environmental impact, propelled consumption of oat milk. Compared to milk and other plant-based milks, the oat milk manufacturing process produces small amounts of carbon dioxide and no methane (low greenhouse gas emissions), and requires relatively low use of water and land. Oat milk production requires 1/15th the amount of water of milk production and 1/8th the water of almond milk.

In addition to environmental concerns, ethical motivations regarding animal welfare are a significant driver for the adoption of oat milk. Research indicates that many consumers choose plant-based alternatives to avoid the animal-origin considerations of the dairy industry, with younger demographics specifically citing a desire to align their consumption habits with personal values regarding the treatment of animals.

== Market ==
Over 2017–2019, oat milk sales in the United States increased tenfold, and Oatly reported a threefold increase in worldwide sales. In the third quarter of 2024, Oatly reported sales of 141 million liters of oat milk, a 13% increase over the same period in 2023.

As of late 2020, the oat milk market became second-largest among plant milks in the United States, following the leader, almond milk, but exceeding the sales of soy milk. The U.S. refrigerated oat milk segment continued to expand during the early 2020s before growth moderated. For the 52 weeks ending June 16, 2024, refrigerated oat milk sales totaled nearly $570 million, with unit sales of about 130 million. Planet Oat was the top-selling brand in the segment, with approximately $190 million in dollar sales and 46 million units sold during the period. By 2023, the global oat milk market was valued at $3.7 billion, growing at an annual rate of 11.5%.

== Nutritional composition ==
=== Nutritional content of human, cow, soy, almond, and oat milks ===
Non-human milks are fortified

Nutrient value per 250 mL cup	Human milk	Cow's milk (whole)	Soy milk (unsweetened)	Almond milk (unsweetened)	Oat milk (unsweetened)
Energy, kJ (kcal)	720 (172)	620 (149)	330 (80)	160 (39)	500 (120)
Protein (g)	2.5	7.69	6.95	1.55	3
Fat (g)	10.8	7.93	3.91	2.88	5
Saturated fat (g)	4.9	4.55	0.5	0.21	0.5
Carbohydrate (g)	17.0	11.71	4.23	1.52	16
Fiber (g)	0	0	1.2	0	2
Sugars (g)	17.0	12.32	1	0	7
Calcium (mg)	79	276	301 (Note: Commonly added to plant milks, which do not naturally contain significant levels of the nutrient.)	516	350
Potassium (mg)	125	322	292	176	389
Sodium (mg)	42	105	90	186	101
Vitamin B_{12} (mcg)	0.1	1.10	2.70	0	1.2
Vitamin A (IU)	522	395 (Note: Vitamin A fortification is only required for skimmed milk in the US.)	503	372	-
Vitamin D (IU)	9.8	124 (Note: Vitamin D fortification for milk is mandatory in the US.)	119	110	-
Cholesterol (mg)	34.4	24	0	0	0

In comparison to cow's milk, oat milk is similar in total calories per liquid volume (per cup serving, 120 vs 149 calories for cow's milk), has 40% the protein content, 63% of the fat, but only about 10% of the saturated fat content, and about 1.5 times the total carbohydrate (although simple sugars are half that of cow's milk). Cow's milk has no fiber, but oat milk has 2g dietary fiber per serving. Calcium and potassium contents are comparable, although oat milk – as for all plant-based milks – may be fortified with specific nutrients during manufacturing. It has a glycemic index of 60; cow's milk is 47.

== Uses ==
Oat milk is used as a substitute for milk in custom coffee preparation, and in fermented products similar to yogurt and kefir. Baristas claim that oat milk needs less steam than cow milk, froths favorably, is tasteful, rich, and creamy like cow milk, and effectively balances the acidity of espresso coffee. It has growing applications in coffee preparation at major coffee shops.

== See also ==
- Almond milk
- Coconut milk
- Plant milk
- Pea milk
- Peanut milk
- Soy milk
