= Milk War =

Belarus–Russia trade dispute

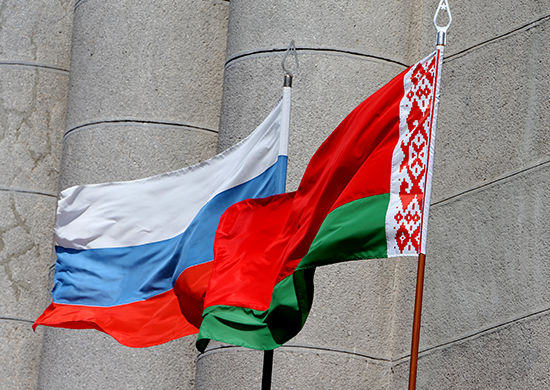
- The flags of Russia (left) and Belarus (right) flying together.
- Date: 6–17 June 2009
- Location: Union State
- Result: Belarusian victory: Russia lifts Belarusian dairy ban

Parties
Russia	Belarus

Lead figures
Dmitry Medvedev; Vladimir Putin; Gennady Onishchenko	Alexander Lukashenko; Sergei Sidorsky

The Milk War was a trade conflict between Russia and Belarus in June 2009. Although Russia and Belarus have close relations, the conflict stemmed from Russia allegedly attempting to loan Belarus US$500 million to recognize the independence of Abkhazia and South Ossetia. Russia also expressed its interest in privatizing the Belarusian milk industry. Belarus responded by seeking negotiations with the European Union on certifying Belarusian milk according to EU regulations. Russia then banned the import of dairy products from Belarus, citing alleged health concerns. The trade conflict ended on June 17, 2009, when Russia announced that it would lift the ban.

Later in 2009, Belarusian president Alexander Lukashenko expressed regret for not supporting Russia in recognizing Abkhazia and South Ossetia. The Belarusian House of Representatives sent a fact-finding mission to the disputed regions to study whether or not Belarus should provide diplomatic recognition. Georgia protested the mission and urged Belarus to maintain non-recognition.

Russia threatened another Milk War in 2013, and has reimposed temporary bans on Belarusian dairy products since. Bans were in place in June 2017, and from February 2018 until being mostly lifted in May 2019. Russian concerns include international sanctions that supposedly allow Belarus to take advantage of the market by producing products of inferior quality. In turn, Belarusian producers claim that Russia has imposed harsh obstacles on them. Belarus has objected to these trade wars, stating that they contribute to the country's international isolation.

== Background ==
Occupied territories of Georgia (Abkhazia and South Ossetia)

Belarus and Russia are two post-Soviet neighbors which are linked through a special treaty of alliance. Tensions between the two began in late 2006, with rising gas prices from Russia and Belarus beginning to reconcile with the European Union (EU). Belarus joined the Eastern Partnership, an initiative to improve economic and political relations between the EU and six post-Soviet states. The EU lifted its travel ban on Belarusian President Alexander Lukashenko, despite maintaining the position that the 2006 Belarusian presidential election was rigged.

Following the 2008 Russo-Georgian War, Russia recognized the disputed regions of Abkhazia and South Ossetia independence. Belarus was pressured to recognize Abkhazia and South Ossetia as independent states. At the time, only Russia and Nicaragua had extended diplomatic recognition to Abkhazia and South Ossetia. Belarus did not recognize Abkhazia or South Ossetia and began negotiations with the United States to release political prisoners. At times of strained relations, Russia has previously banned meat products from Poland, wine from Moldova, canned fish from Latvia and most agricultural products from Georgia.

== Trade dispute ==
=== Putin's visit to Minsk ===
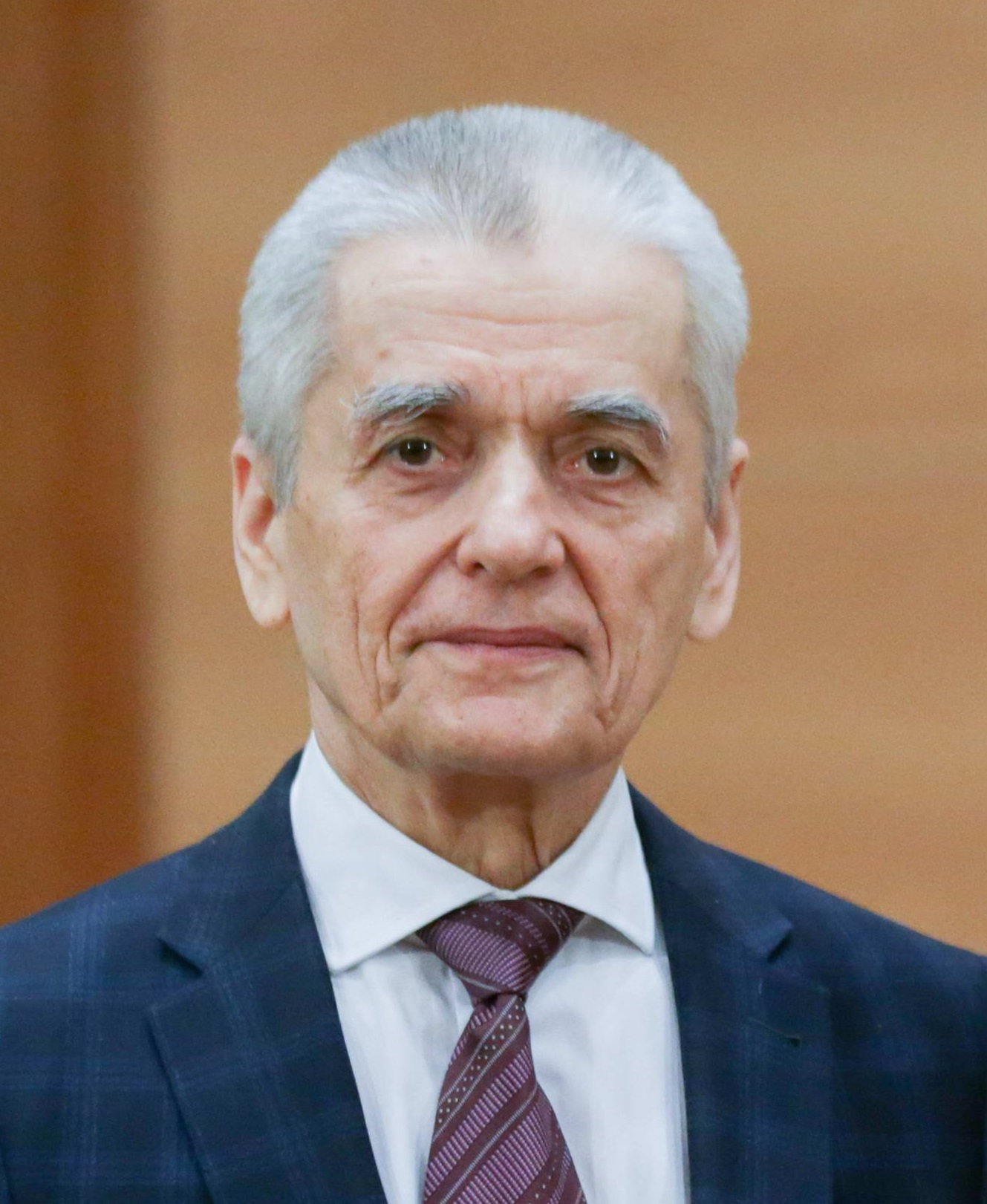
Chief Sanitary Inspector Gennady Onishchenko advised Russia to place the ban on Belarusian dairy product imports

On May 29, 2009, Russian Prime Minister Vladimir Putin visited Belarus's capital Minsk and offered the final US$500 million of a $2.4 billion loan under the condition that the loan would be paid in Russian rubles. Lukashenko claimed that the loan was offered on the condition that Belarus would recognize Abkhazia and South Ossetia as independent. Russian officials denied this and froze the loan, with Russian politician Alexei Kudrin expressing concerns by claiming that Belarus could not afford to be economically independent by the year's end. Frustrated by being economically dependent on Russia, Belarus refused to take the loan. Following the cancellation of Russia's loan, Belarus secured a $1 billion loan from the International Monetary Fund.

During the visit, Russia also sought to have major Belarusian dairy producers privatized. Belarus responded immediately by beginning negotiations with the EU on certifying Belarusian milk standards according to EU regulations. Russia reacted by sending health inspectors led by Chief Sanitary Inspector Gennady Onishchenko, who was previously responsible for banning food items from other post-Soviet states. Onishchenko claimed that Belarusian dairy products lacked proper certification and advised Russia to ban all related imports. Russian media began broadcasting the claims that Belarusian dairy products were a health hazard.

=== Dairy ban, CSTO boycott and negotiations ===
The New York Times described Russia's health concerns as "a weapon in geopolitical disputes" that Russia commonly uses in trade disputes. On June 6, 2009, Russia banned around 1,200 milk and dairy products from Belarus. The ban was viewed as severely damaging to the Belarusian dairy industry, of which 95 percent of its exports go to Russia. However, a Belarusian official stated that it was "difficult to understand why these products were banned in such [a] loud and demonstrative way", reflecting that Russia had never approved them for import. Russian officials denied that the ban was political. The New York Times, Politico, and The Sunday Times have referred the trade conflict as the "milk war".

Lukashenko called for his advisors to draw up a list of hypothetical economic threats Russia might impose on Belarus. The Belarusian Ministry of Foreign Affairs said the ban was "discriminatory trade restrictions violating international agreements". The Ministry of Foreign Affairs also announced Lukashenko's intentions to boycott the Collective Security Treaty Organisation (CSTO) summit held in Moscow. The summit was for the signing of a collective security agreement. Russia viewed the summit as critical to countering NATO and Western influence in post-Soviet states. Lukashenko denounced the signing, arguing that any agreement was illegitimate without the participation of all member states; Uzbekistan was also absent from the summit.

Negotiations began on June 15, 2009. The alleged health concerns about the dairy products were not brought up during negotiations. On June 17, Russia announced that its ban of Belarusian dairy products would be lifted the next day. Putin explained that the reasoning behind the Milk War was the amount of imported dairy products, with no mention of previous quality concerns. The number of Belarusian dairy products allowed to be imported into Russia was later doubled. Belarus dismantled customs posts established during the Milk War and withdrew thirty customs officers placed at the Belarus–Russia border. Following the lifting of the ban, Andrew Wilson of the think-tank European Council on Foreign Relations declared Lukashenko the winner of the Milk War, but expressed concerns about Belarus's long-term survival. Vitali Silitski wrote for Politico that Russia would continue with efforts to remove Lukashenko from office.

== Aftermath ==
=== Belarusian fact-finding in Abkhazia and South Ossetia ===
In July 2009, the Belarusian Ministry of Foreign Affairs issued a travel warning stating that citizens should only enter Abkhazia and South Ossetia through Georgia. During a September 2009 meeting in Lithuania, Lukashenko stated that Belarus should have recognized Abkhazia and South Ossetia as independent long ago to support Russia. Lukashenko blamed a "witch-hunt against Belarus" over the cancelled $500 million loan and that "some in [the Russian leadership] wanted to bend us over, or did not want us to recognize these republics at all."

In October 2009, Lukashenko praised Belarus's relations with Abkhazia and South Ossetia, and stated that he needed to study their situation before deciding to recognize their independence. Chairman of the House of Representatives Vladimir Andreichenko announced that he'd "carry out an objective assessment" on Abkhazia and South Ossetia. Later in the month, Lukashenko expressed his opinion that Russia had no other choice but to recognize Abkhazia and South Ossetia independence based on "their rights to self-determination". In November 2009, Belarus dispatched parliament members to Georgia, Abkhazia, and South Ossetia to carry out the study. Georgia reacted by urging Belarus not to recognize the disputed regions as independent states.

=== Post–2009 developments ===
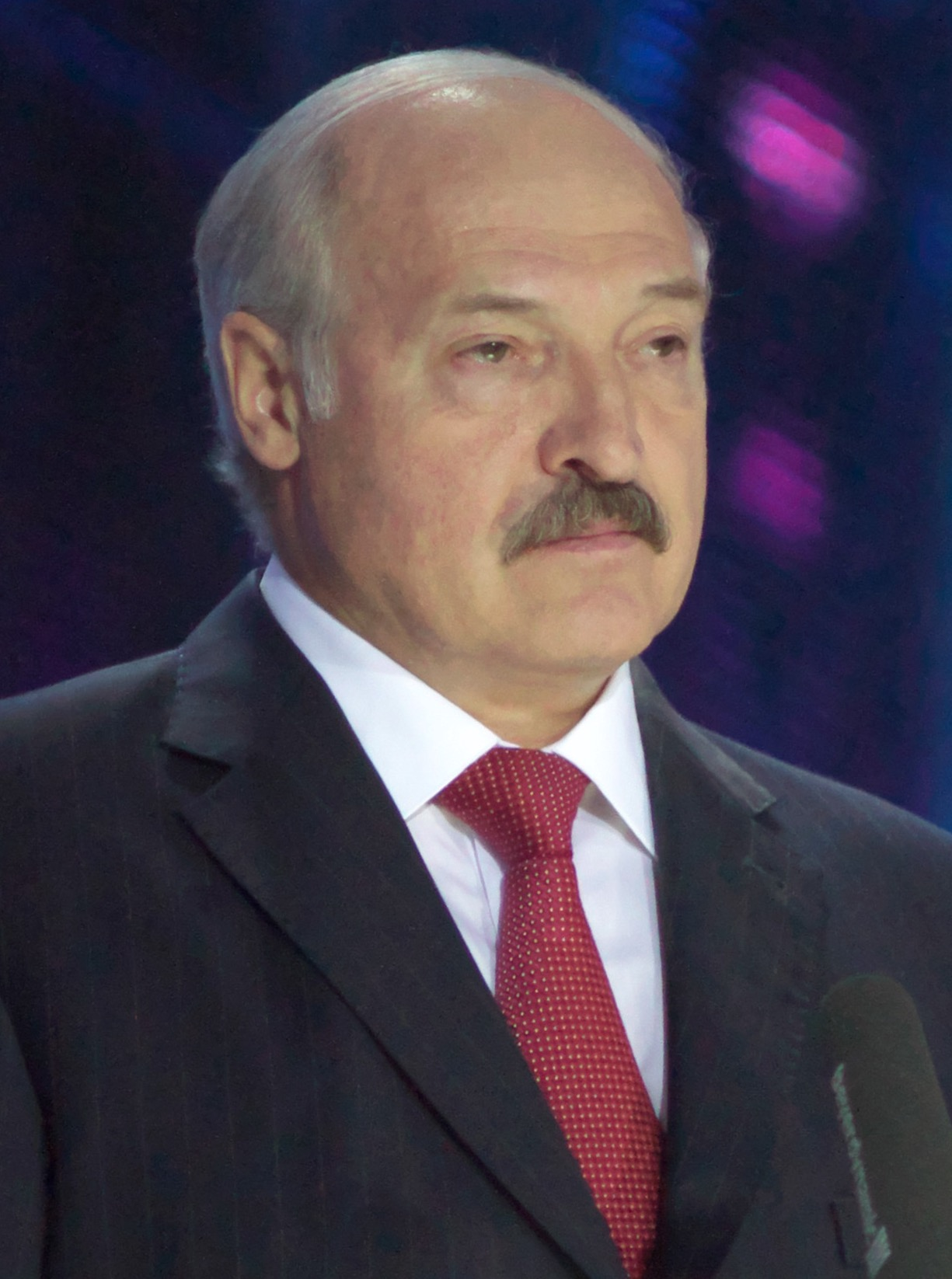
In December 2010, leaked cables indicated that Alexander Lukashenko felt that he did not receive enough credit for not recognizing Abkhazia and South Ossetia despite Russian pressure

In December 2010, leaked US diplomatic cables indicated that Lukashenko had complained about the EU not giving him enough credit for resisting Russian pressure to recognize Abkhazia and South Ossetia. The cables also indicated that Lukashenko expressed concerns that rising Russian gas prices would force Belarus to recognize Abkhazia and South Ossetia. In March 2014, following the Russian annexation of Crimea from Ukraine, Lukashenko equated Belarus's stance towards recognizing Crimea's disputed status to its stance towards Abkhazia and South Ossetia. Lukashenko stated, "Crimea, just like Ossetia, Abkhazia and other regions, is not an independent state. Today Crimea is [de facto] part of the Russian Federation. No matter whether you recognize it or not, the fact remains." In March 2018, Paata Sheshelidze, president of the New Economic School – Georgia, reported that Georgia was continuously paying Belarus for its non-recognition.

=== Russian checkbook diplomacy ===
Since the Milk War, Russia has engaged in "checkbook diplomacy" and paid multiple states for their recognition of Abkhazia and South Ossetia. In September 2009, Venezuela became the third state to recognize Abkhazia and South Ossetia as independent. A week later, Russia signed "multibillion dollar economic and arms trade deals" with Venezuela, described by the Jamestown Foundation as a "recognition fee". In December 2009, Nauru became the fourth state to recognize Abkhazia and South Ossetia as independent, which Georgia alleged was in return for a $50 million investment from Russia. In May 2011, Vanuatu recognized Abkhazia; Vanuatuan politician Joe Natuman has stated that Russia gave Vanuatu $50 million for the recognition.

In October 2011, Tuvalu recognized Abkhazia and South Ossetia, but later withdrew recognition in March 2014 after Georgia offered Tuvalu $250,000. Oliver Bullough, writing for The New Republic, stated that Tuvalu's decision "could spell the end of a years-long diplomatic strategy that has cost Russia millions." Georgia has also given Fiji 200 computers to maintain non-recognition. In May 2018, Syria recognized Abkhazia and South Ossetia; Russia has been providing Syria with military support to fight its civil war since 2015.

== Later trade disputes ==
=== 2013 threat and 2017 temporary ban ===
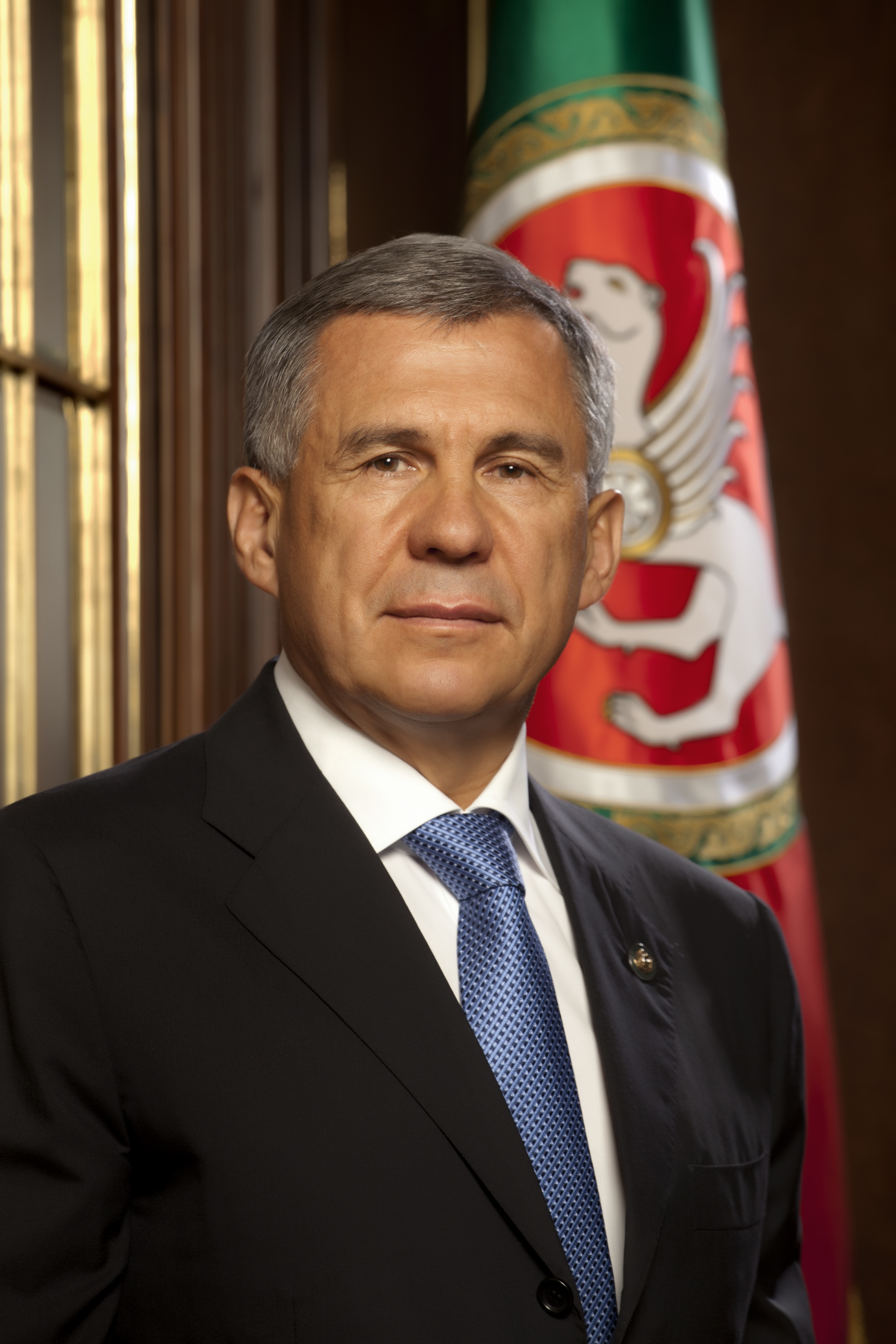
In 2018, Rustam Minnikhanov's concerns for dairy farmers in Tatarstan coincided with another ban on Belarusian dairy products

In August 2013, Vladislav Baumgertner, CEO of Russian potash producer Uralkali, was arrested in Minsk for involvement in an alleged criminal scheme after Belarus invited him for talks. In October 2013, Russia banned dairy imports from Lithuania, with Onishchenko citing quality concerns. The ban was seen as an effort to put political pressure on Lithuania, which then held the Presidency of the Council of the European Union, for planning to host an EU summit that would offer closer economic ties to several post-Soviet states. Russia announced in December 2013 its intentions to lift the ban after Lithuania threatened to file a complaint to the World Trade Organization about a "milk war". In January 2014, the restrictions were lifted.

In 2014, the EU and US imposed sanctions on Russia because of its annexation of Crimea from Ukraine. Russia responded by banning the import of certain foods from Western countries. Russia has accused Belarus of exploiting this situation by making substandard goods for export to Russia, while Belarusian producers say that Russia has intentionally created trade barriers. In June 2017, Russia placed a ban on cheese produced by Belarusian companies Belsyr and Shchuchin Creamery, citing fraud with labeling inconsistencies. Russia lifted the ban later in the month. From 2016 to 2017, exports of Belarusian dairy products to Russia decreased by 12.8%.

=== 2018–2019 dairy ban ===
We don't have an embargo on Belarusian milk per se [...] I think as soon as [Belarusian] enterprises solve the problem, they will immediately have the restrictions lifted. And there will be no problem. It's just a matter of time.

— Artyom Belov, Director General of the National Dairy Producers Union

On February 16, 2018, Tatarstan President Rustam Minnikhanov met with Russian Prime Minister Dmitry Medvedev and expressed his concerns that local farmers were suffering losses because dairy production had been shifted to cheaper labor for milk powder in Belarus. On February 20, Medvedev made a public call for Russia to prioritize its domestic dairy industry, specifically in Tatarstan, instead of depending on other Eurasian Economic Union members. Medvedev instructed Deputy Prime Minister Arkady Dvorkovich to draw up an economic proposal for the dairy industry. Two days later, Russia temporarily banned some Belarusian dairy products, citing health concerns. Deputy of the State Duma Ayrat Khairullin raised his suspicions that Belarusian dairy products which entered Russia for delivery to Kazakhstan and Kyrgyzstan were instead being illegally delivered to Russian plants, citing irregularities in transport.

On March 1, 2018, Lukashenko acknowledged the ban. On April 24, 2018, Lukashenko delivered his State of the Nation Address and criticized both Western nations and Russia for contributing to Belarus's isolation. In the address, Lukashenko called out "those milk, meat, and sugar wars our closest partner has launched against us in order to block our goods from entering the Russian market". Prices for Russian raw milk rose during the summer of 2018. In May 2019, the ban on the import of milk in bulk from Belarus to Russia was lifted. However, the ban on some Belarusian dairy products remained in place.

== See also ==
- 2007 Russia–Belarus energy dispute
- 2006 Russian ban of Moldovan and Georgian wines
