= Southern States =

Southern States may refer to:

- The independent states of the Southern Hemisphere

== United States ==
- Southern United States, or the American South
- Southern States Cooperative, an American farmer-owned agricultural supply cooperative
- Southern States Athletic Conference, a collegiate athletic league
- The independent states of the South in the North-South divide
