= Grange League =

Grange League may refer to:

- American Football League (1926)
- Agway
