= Oatly =

Swedish vegan food brand

Oatly Group AB

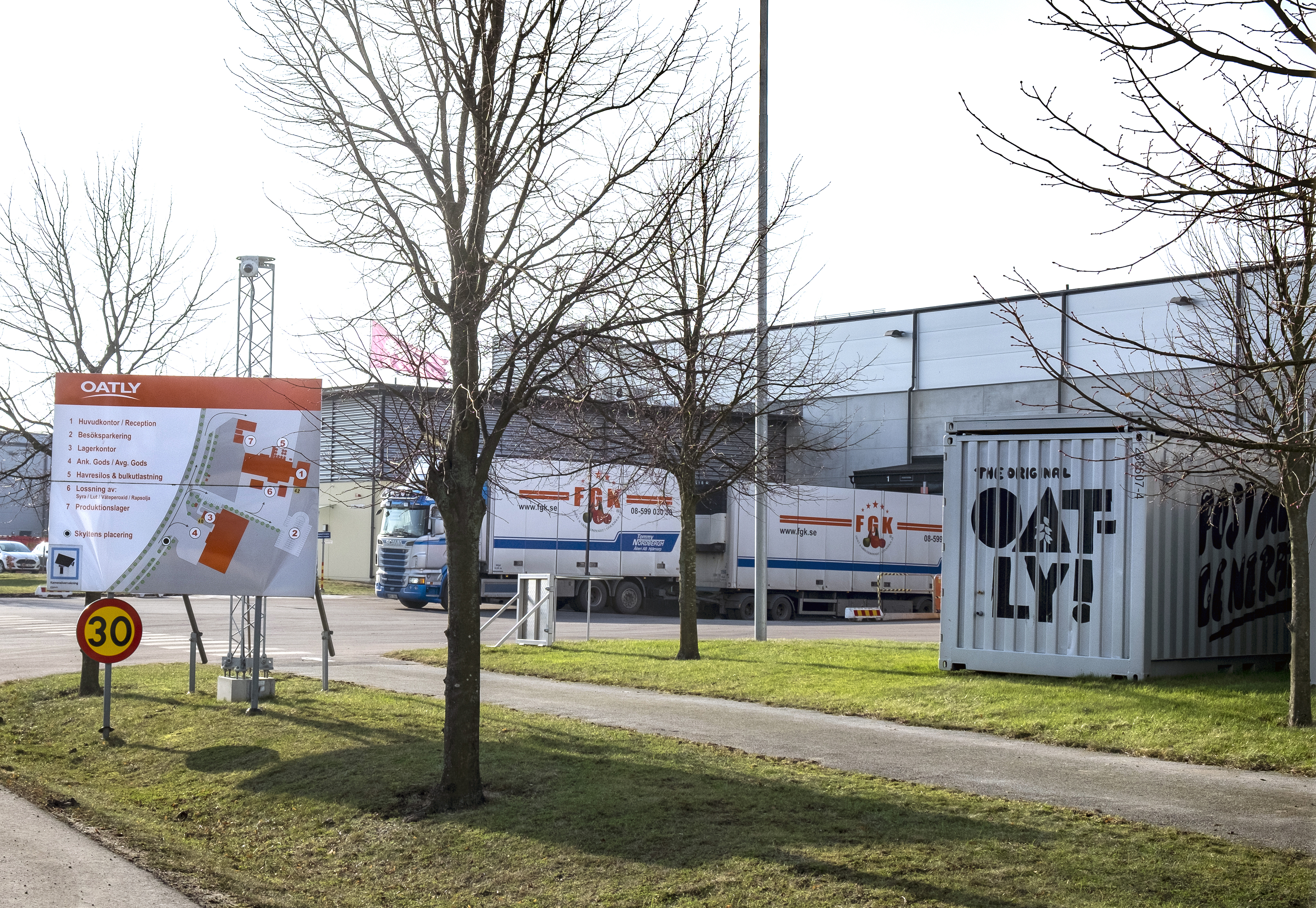
- Facility in Landskrona, Sweden
- Type: Public
- Traded as: Nasdaq: OTLY
- Founded: 1994; 32 years ago
- Headquarters: Malmö, Sweden
- Area served: International
- Products: Dairy alternatives
- Revenue: ▲US$862.46 million (2025)
- Net income: ▼ −US$153.12 million (2025)
- Total assets: ▼US$787.197 million (2025)
- Total equity: ▼US$19.671 million (2025)
- Number of employees: 1,388 (2025)
- Website: oatly.com

Oatly Group AB is a Swedish food company, publicly traded on the American stock market, that produces alternatives to dairy products from oats, including oat milk. Oatly was formed in the 1990s using research from Lund University. Oatly has headquarters in Malmö and a production and development centre in Landskrona.

Oatly operates internationally, with markets in Europe, North America and China. The company's products are available in thousands of retail stores, coffee shops and restaurants in over 40 countries. Oatly is available in 11,000 coffee and tea shops in China, and at more than 6,000 retail and specialty shops across the United States, including thousands of Starbucks locations.

== History ==
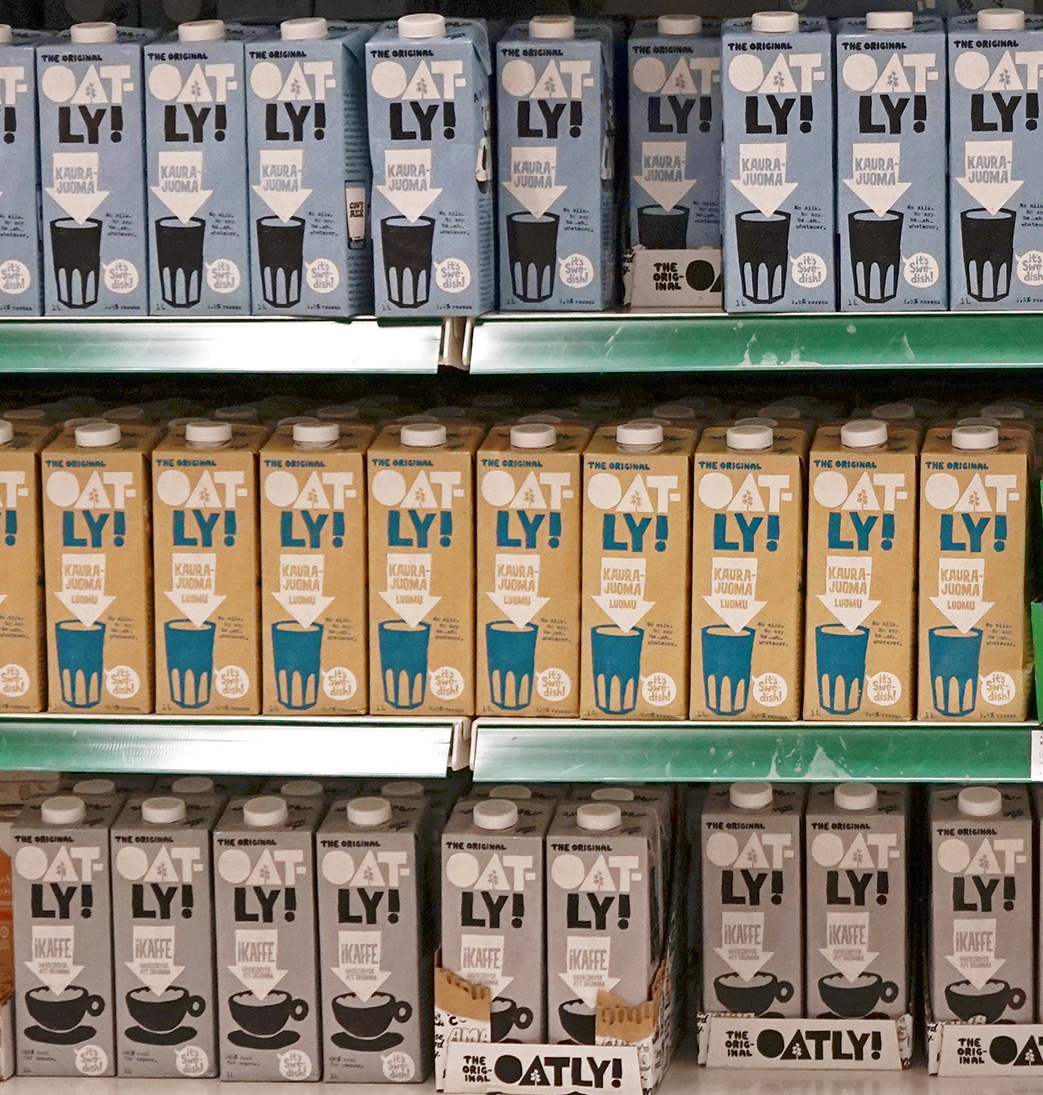
In Finland, oat drinks for sale: Regular, Organic, and Barista

Oatly was founded in 1994 by food scientist Rickard Öste and his brother Björn Öste. The parent company of Oatly AB is Ceba AB, which was founded by Rickard Öste, Ingegerd Sjöholm, Inger Ahlden and Lennart Lindahl together with the cereals company Skånska Lantmännen on 17 February 1994 Oatly Group changed its name from Havre Global AB on 1 March 2021.

Oatly is now part-owned by Blackstone Inc. (7%), Verlinvest, 45,9% via Nativus Company Limited a part of China Resources (a conglomerate owned by the Chinese state), Industrifonden, Östersjöstiftelsen, and the employees. The group also included celebrities such as Oprah Winfrey and Jay-Z, as well as Starbucks former chairman and chief executive officer Howard Schultz.

It opened its first US factory in Millville, New Jersey, in 2019. In 2021, Oatly applied to be listed in the United States on the Nasdaq under the ticker symbol "OTLY". When the company set terms for its initial public offering, its potential value was estimated at more than $10 billion. Morgan Stanley, J.P. Morgan and Credit Suisse were the underwriters. OTLY stock was priced at $17 but had its first public trade at $22.12 on the first day.

== Products ==
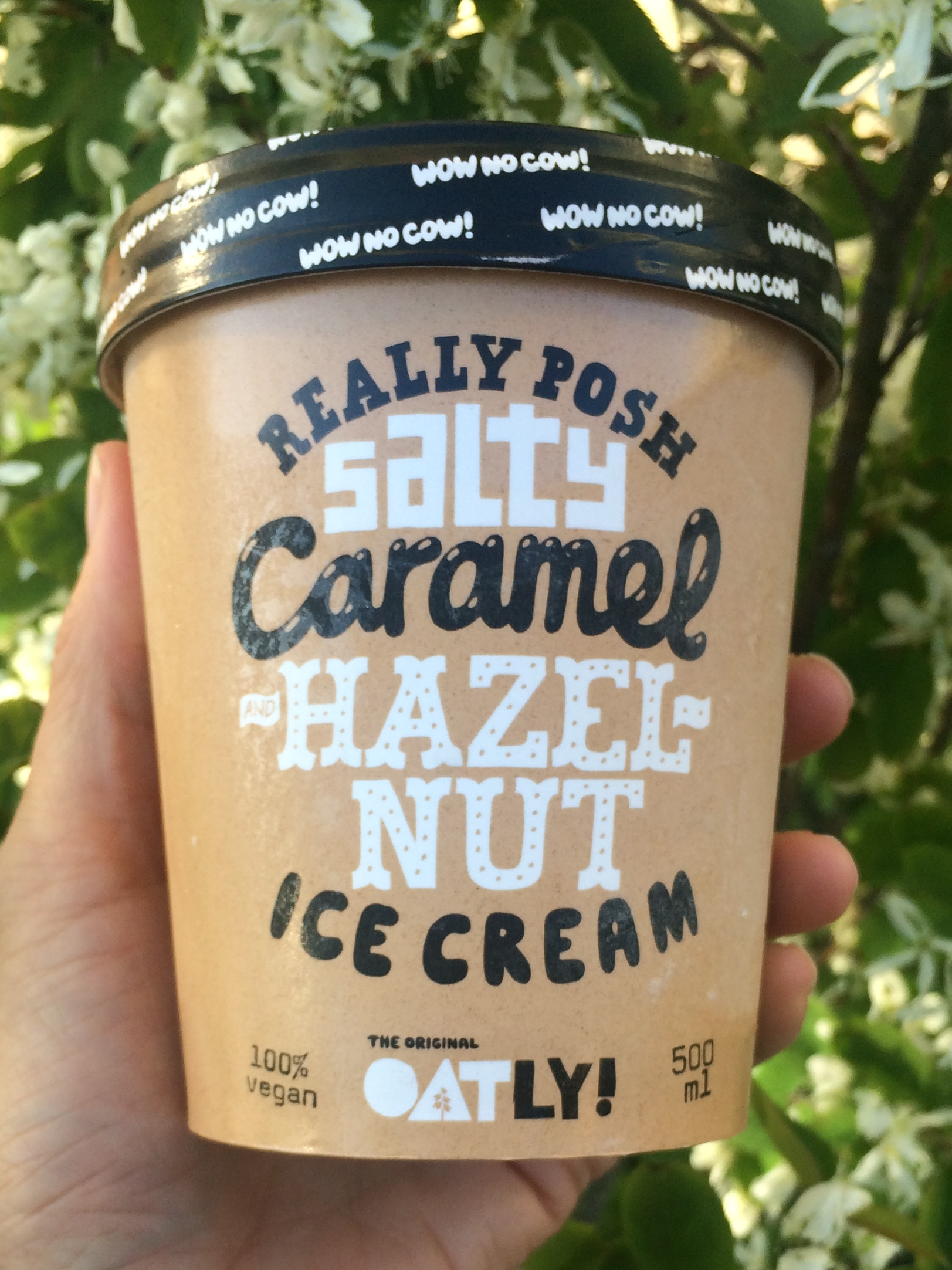
Oatly Salty Caramel Hazelnut vegan ice cream

Oatly has a range of products including: oat milk, ice cream, cold coffee, yogurt substitutes, cooking cream, spread, custard and mayonnaise. Oatly's first product was released in 2001. All products are certified kosher and vegan and are non-GMO project verified. All US Oatly products are certified gluten free. However, in Europe and Asia, Oatly's products are not gluten free.

In the US, Oatly's oat beverages, frozen desserts, and "oatgurt" are offered. Varieties of oat milk available in the US include the following: barista edition, original, chocolate, full fat, and low-fat oat milk. Oatly also offers a nondairy frozen dessert, similar to an ice cream, in several flavours. Flavours available for purchase in the US include chocolate chip, mint chip, coffee, strawberry, chocolate, vanilla, oat, and salted caramel. Oatly frozen desserts are available in store only, in the United States. Oatgurt, a substitute yoghurt, is made with oats and does not contain any dairy. The product contains active and live cultures. Flavours of oatgurt available in the US include plain, strawberry, peach, black cherry, and mixed berry.

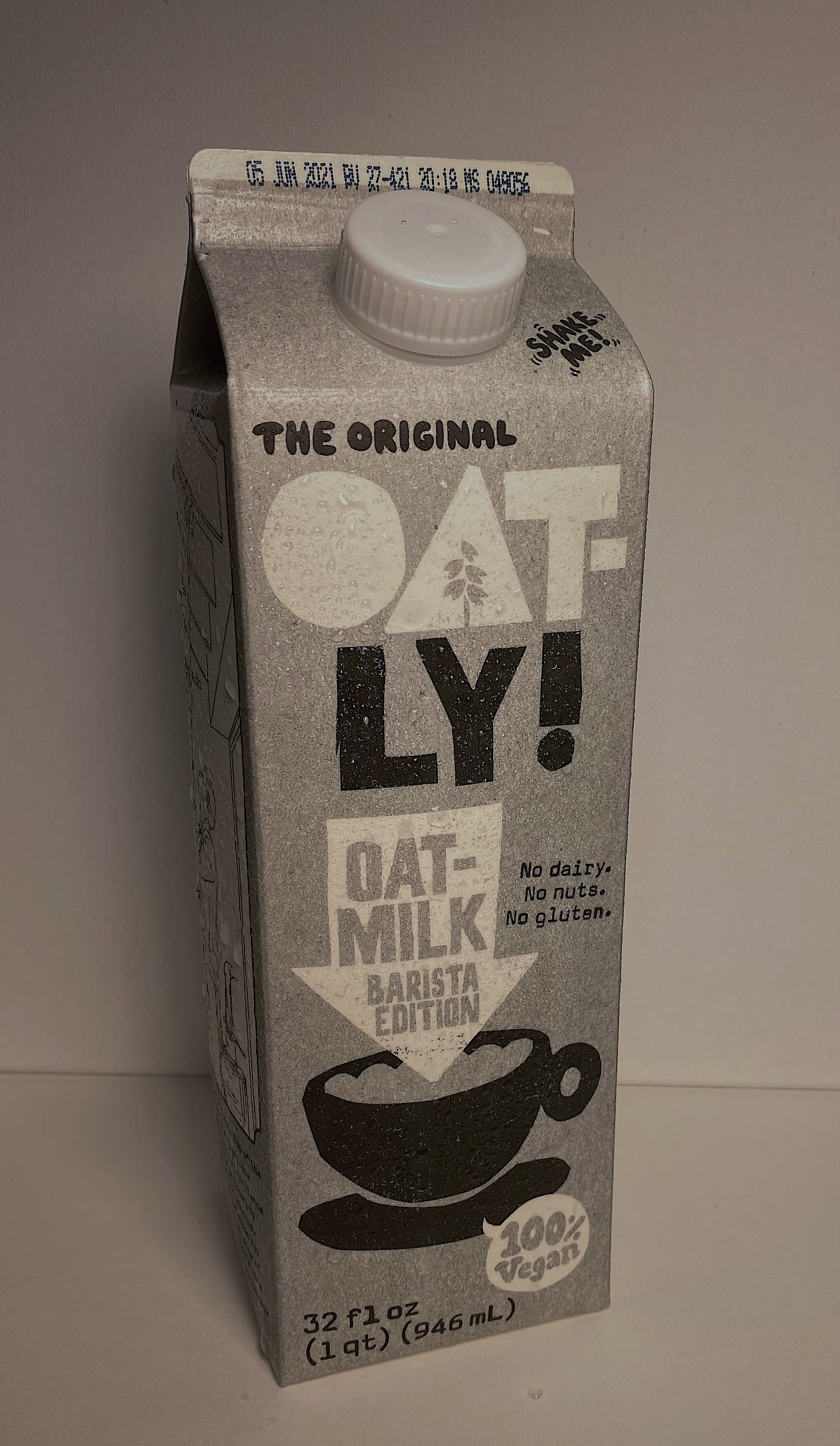
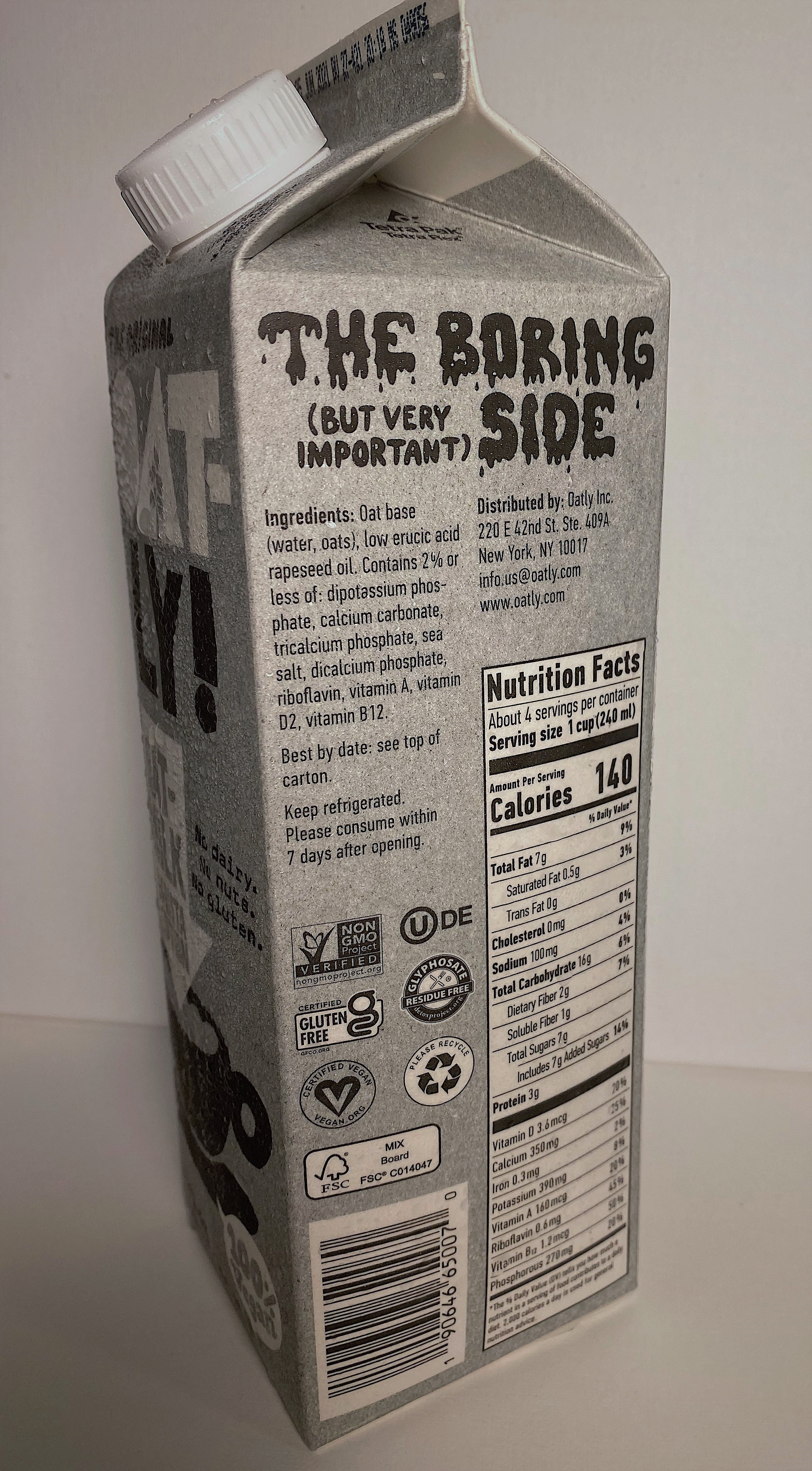
Oatly Barista Edition oat milk

Internationally, Oatly also offers on the go, single-serve beverages packaged in silver containers that resemble cans, but are made of recyclable paper. Varieties include chocolate oat milk, cold brew latte, organic matcha latte, and organic mocha latte. Additionally, both boxed oat drink and boxed chocolate oat drink are available outside the US.

The only nutritional difference between Oatly's original oat milk and barista edition oat milk is fat content. The barista edition contains doubled amount of fat compared to the original version (3% versus 1.5%). The higher fat content allows the oat milk to perform better when steamed, frothed, and paired with espresso for coffee drinks, hence the name "barista edition". It also makes for a richer and more pleasant flavour complement to teas in tea lattes and is commonly used as a milk alternative for matcha lattes.

In 2026, Oatly expanded its product range with the launch of a new fiber beverage.

== Sustainability ==
Oatly states that its oat-based products can be seen as climate solutions. According to its 2025 sustainability report, the company produced around 595 million liters of products that year. Accordning to Oatly, studies of its barista oat drinks show a lower or comparable impact to cow's milk in between six and nine of ten environmental catagories. According to its 2025 sustainability report, Oatly lowered its emissions by about 8% between 2024 and 2025 while sales grew by 4.7%. The company argues that its largest climate impact comes from consumers switching from cow’s milk to Oatly, rather than from reducing its own emissions.

== Advertising ==
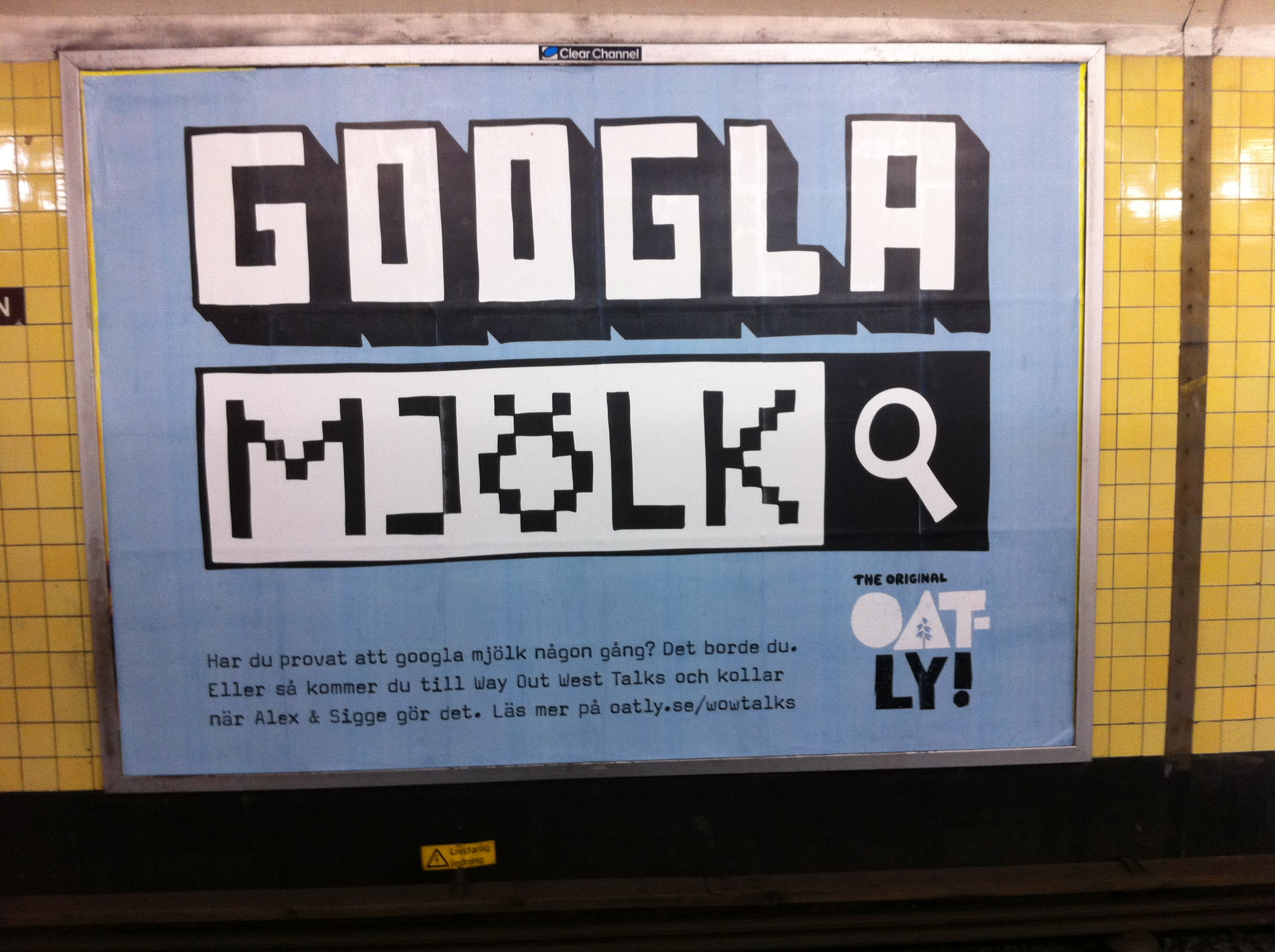
Oatly advertisement on the Stockholm Metro, 2016

The Danish dairy company Arla Foods produced a series of adverts to discourage people from buying vegan alternatives to cow's milk and used a fake brand 'Pjölk' which was similar to Oatly. In response, Oatly trademarked the fictitious brands Pjölk, Brölk, Sölk, and Trölk and began using them on their packaging.

The Swedish dairy lobby LRF Mjölk successfully sued Oatly for using the phrase "Milk, but made for humans." In response to the lawsuit, Oatly published the text of the lawsuit leading to an increase in sales.

In 2018, Oatly spent £700,000 on advertising in the UK on All 4 and on billboards in train stations in Brixton, King's Cross, Oxford Circus, and Shoreditch using the "Milk, but made for humans" slogan banned in Sweden.

In February 2021, the company advertised during Super Bowl LV. The commercial, called "Wow, No Cow", featured CEO Toni Petersson singing a jingle in an oat field. The ad was originally aired in Sweden in 2014, which got banned due to a lawsuit from LRF Mjölk that sued Oatly for using the phrase "Milk, but made for humans".

Later that month, Oatly launched its first Europe-wide advertising campaign called "Are You Stupid?", showing results from focus group testing, showing people recognising which products do and do not contain dairy, irrespective of packaging, and directing viewers to a petition against "Amendment 171", supported by the European Dairy Association, which seeks to ban non-dairy products from using "dairy-based descriptors" such as "dairy", "creamy", "yoghurt-style dessert" or "does not contain milk" and could be interpreted to ban "packaging designs that call to mind dairy products, such as yoghurt pots or milk cartons" and ban climate impact comparisons. Campaigners — and one focus group member — argued that Amendment 171 would make it harder for the EU to meet its goal of increasing plant-based food consumption. Amendment 171 was approved by majority vote in the European Parliament in October 2020 and went into trilogue negotiations in late January 2021. On 25 May 2021 the EU withdrew Amendment 171, thus allowing plant-based dairy companies to use words like "buttery" or "creamy" to describe their products.

In the beginning of 2022, several Oatly ads were banned by the British Advertising Standards Authority (ASA), a private regulatory body. The ASA did not dispute Oatly's claim that a vegan diet would reduce greenhouse gas emissions. But the ASA found consumers could confuse claims for Oatly Barista Edition with its other products, and that a study comparing the meat and dairy industry to the transportation industry did not compare the two equally.

In 2024, Oatly announced a partnership with the Minor League Baseball where they would play at all 120 teams of the MiLB. They said they were going to be known as the 121st team of the MiLB, known as the "Malmo Oat Milkers".

In September 2024, Oatly launched a campaign in the UK promoting the use of oat milk in tea, emphasizing how their product complements the popular British beverage, as part of their continued efforts to encourage plant-based milk alternatives.

== Brand activism ==
Oatly has been studied in marketing research as an example of an activist brand. According to the research, the company has taken a stand against the dairy industry and pushed for changes in food policy rather than only focusing on selling its products.

== Controversies ==
In 2018 the company was publicly criticized for supporting a local pig farm to which it sold the residue of its manufacturing process. The company said it would "re-visit the issue."

On 14 July 2021 short seller Spruce Point Capital published a report questioning Oatly's management and sustainability. Spruce Point alleged that Oatly overstated revenue and margins, among other accounting issues, and accused the company of green washing for understating water usage, and for not having a waste-water treatment facility. After the announcement Oatly's stock briefly went below IPO, resulting in several class-action lawsuits. Glenn Vanzura of Mayer Brown stated that it is common in other industries that after a short-seller targets a company to drive down stock price, a class action lawsuit is filed, noting that such lawsuits are often dismissed.

Oatly took a small British firm, Glebe Farm Foods, to court, alleging it had infringed Oatly's trademark by selling cartons of an oat-based drink called "PureOaty". In August 2021, the judge dismissed Oatly's case at the High Court of Justice in London, concluding there was only a "very modest level of similarity" between the Glebe Farm branding and Oatly's.

In 2020, Oatly's sale of a US$200-million stake to investors including Blackstone Inc., which has financed companies driving extensive deforestation in the Amazon, as well as driving road development into the depths of the jungle for export of foodstuffs, angered consumers and led to a backlash against the company.
