= 2006 Russian ban of Moldovan and Georgian wines =

A Komsomolskaya Pravda poster reads in Russian: "Respect Yourself and the Motherland — DON'T DRINK Georgian Wine!" (May 5, 2006)

The 2006 Russian import ban of Moldovan and Georgian wines began in late March 2006 and created a diplomatic conflict between the Republic of Moldova and Georgia on the one hand and Russia on the other. Wine trade with Russia was responsible for 80-90% of the total wine exports in both countries.

The Chief Sanitary Inspector of Russia Gennadiy Onishchenko claimed that heavy metals and pesticides had been found in Georgian and Moldovan wines and that they were falsified alcoholic products labeled as wines. The Russian Consumer Agency claimed that it had examined 21 sorts of Georgian wine sold in Moscow and concluded that 85.7% did not comply with sanitary requirements. Pesticides were supposedly discovered in 60% samples of Moldovan and 44% samples of Georgian wine. However, the Moldovans claimed that no proof was provided by the Russians and that dozens of countries across the world imported Moldovan wines without any reported problems. Moldova argued that the ban amounted to economic blackmail. Seven Georgian wineries were later closed down after the government revision revealed that they had produced falsified wine.

In May 2006, Georgian Defense Minister Irakli Okruashvili stated that "many [Georgian] wine producers exported falsified wine to Russia, because Russia is a market where you can sell even turds". Okruashvili thought that Russia's decision to ban the import of Georgian wines "was not a surprise" for Tbilisi.

Russia accounted for 80% of Georgian wine sales, and the ban was a major blow to the industry. Georgian producers swiftly admitted that wines were regularly faked. Prior to the ban, the Georgian government closed down several testing laboratories in Georgia, and several wineries were made to dump their product. Seven Georgian wineries were closed down after the government revision revealed that they had produced falsified wine. Production of falsified wine in Georgia for the rapidly expanding Russian market had been "big business for the last decade" according to the press.

The ban on wine imports came at a time of worsening relations between the countries. The differences involved the Rose Revolution and pro-NATO/pro-EU moves in Georgia and a divergence of the Russian and Moldovan positions regarding the future of Transnistria. A year earlier, the Russian Duma had demanded a ban on Moldovan wine imports, because Moldova was considered to pursue anti-Russian policies.

EU's external relations commissioner Benita Ferrero-Waldner stated that the EU was worried about what she called an "embargo" against Moldova, but the EU couldn't take any measures since Russia was not a member of the World Trade Organization. The president of NATO Parliamentary Assembly Pierre Lellouche also said that he was deeply concerned about the Russian ban on Georgian products.

From 5 May to 6 May 2006, the Russian government also banned the import of Borjomi (Russian: Боржоми, Georgian: ბორჯომი) and Nabeglavi (Russian: Набеглави, Georgian: ნაბეღლავი), two popular brands of Georgian mineral water. The government claimed that it was a health hazard since it failed to meet water purity standards. The Georgian government responded by stating that the action was an expansion of the wine embargo and a part of a political campaign to punish the country for pro-Western policies, a claim President Mikheil Saakashvili of Georgia reiterated at the Conference on Common Vision for Common Neighborhood held in Vilnius, Lithuania, from May 1 to 4, and attended also by the presidents of the three Baltic states, Poland, Ukraine, Moldova, Romania, Bulgaria and the United States Vice-President Richard Cheney.

Neither the Georgian or Moldovan wines nor the Borjomi or Nabeglavi mineral waters had been banned nor restricted in any other country besides Russia. One Russian expert has also criticized the Russian ban on "Borjomi". Georgia threatened to block Russia's bid to join World Trade Organization in response to the ban, with Russia requiring approval from Georgia, the United States and Moldova at this point to join WTO.

The drink ban appeared to exacerbate tensions between Russia and the Government of Georgia. The 2008 South Ossetia war would occur later that year. Following the conflict, Georgia also withdrew from the Commonwealth of Independent States (CIS), a bloc of several post-Soviet countries.

In 2013, Georgian wines were sold in over 50 countries, including Ukraine, which became the key market after the Russian ban. However, sales later fell sharply, to about one third of what Georgia exported prior to the ban.

== Return of Georgian wines to the Russian market ==
In early 2013, negotiations between Russian and Georgian authorities and wineries were held in Moscow. Russia agreed to send inspectors to about 60 wine producing facilities in Georgia. According to an industry expert in the Georgian government, local wine products had a chance to return to the Russian market in 2013, and the country planned to grow wine production by 50% in 2015, almost reaching pre-ban levels. However, wine industry experts in Russia expected Georgian wines would enjoy limited interest in Russia, at about 1% market share, compared to 10% before the ban. The main reason is that the market became much more competitive since 2006, with many local, Western European, and South American wine brands, especially in the mid-price segment.

The ban was lifted by the end of 2013.

== See also ==
- Milk War
- Moldovan wine
- 2013 Russian ban of Moldovan wines
