= Öste =

Öste is a Swedish language surname. Notable people with the surname include:

- Bengt Öste (1927–2004), Swedish journalist and TV presenter
- Bjorn Öste, a cofounder of Oatly, a Swedish food company, with his brother Rickard
- Rickard Öste (born 1948), Swedish scientist and businessman
