= Planet Oat =

American oat milk brand

- Type: Subsidiary
- Industry: Oat milk
- Founded: 2018
- Headquarters: Lynnfield, Massachusetts
- Parent: HP Hood
- Website: planetoat.com

Planet Oat is an American brand of oat milk and oat milk coffee creamers. It was launched in 2018 and is the most popular brand of oat milk in the United States by market share.

== History ==
Amid a shift in consumer preferences with rapid growth of demand for plant milks, H.P. Hood began developing and testing oat milk in 2013. Development took several years as the company focused on improving the product’s taste and texture before bringing Planet Oat to market in 2018. At launch, four flavors were available: Original, Extra Creamy, Vanilla, and Dark Chocolate. Ahead of its rollout, Planet Oat secured distribution at retailers including Kroger, Shaw’s, and Amazon Fresh.

Within the brand's first year, it had captured the largest share of the U.S. oat milk market, entering during a period of rapid growth in oat milk consumption. U.S. retail oat milk sales grew by roughly 330% between 2019 and 2022.

In 2020, Planet Oat became an oat milk provider to Dunkin' Donuts. The partnership allowed Planet Oat to expand its presence in the food-service market, amid the broader mainstream adoption of oat milk, which had grown rapidly in the United States between 2018 and 2020. The product being free of dairy and tree nuts distinguished it from other milk options offered by Dunkin’.

During a period of rapid growth in the U.S. oat milk market, Planet Oat expanded its product portfolio to include unsweetened oat milk varieties, gaining share in the category and reaching a 38% volume share of U.S. oat milk sales in September 2022. The company's ads stated that its product contains 40% less sugar than competitors.

== Product and market position ==
As of 2026, Planet Oat is the oat milk brand with the largest market share in the United States with 37% of the market.

Planet Oat offers oat milk in several varieties, including Original, Extra Creamy, Vanilla, and Dark Chocolate. It expanded its portfolio with the introduction of Barista Lovers in 2024, a variety formulated for use in coffee, and Humble Edition in 2026, a five-ingredient oat milk. It expanded beyond oat milk into coffee creamers and unsweetened oat milk varieties. In 2026, Planet Oat introduced Zero Sugar Caramel and Zero Sugar Vanilla Cinnamon oat-based creamers, which the company described as the first zero-sugar oat creamers in the category.
