= John A. Kaneb =

American businessperson (1934–2021)

- Born: December 14, 1934; Worcester, Massachusetts
- Died: August 29, 2021 (aged 86)
- Education: Harvard College
- Occupations: CEO of HP Hood; Part-owner of Boston Red Sox

John A. Kaneb (December 14, 1934 – August 29, 2021) was the chairman of the board of directors and CEO of HP Hood LLC and president of the Catamount Companies. Kaneb was also a part owner of the Boston Red Sox.

== Biography ==
Kaneb was born in Worcester in 1934, and graduated from Harvard College with a Bachelor of Arts Degree in Economics in 1956. After graduating, he became an officer in the United States Navy.

The Kaneb family acquired HP Hood LLC in 1995 and increased its annual sales from US$600 million to about US$2.3 billion. Kaneb was also a part owner of the Boston Red Sox.

Besides his business work, Kaneb was a Trustee Emeritus of the University of Notre Dame. He was also an Emeritus Trustee of the Massachusetts General Hospital and Emeritus Trustee and former chairman of the Board of McLean Hospital. He has worked on other boards and groups including the Board of Fellows of the Harvard Medical School. He was appointed by President George W. Bush to serve on the National Prison Rape Elimination Commission in 2004. As of 2008, he was vice-chair of that commission.

Kaneb was also Vice Chair Emeritus of the Finance Council, Chairman of the Clergy Funds Board and Vice Chair of the Catholic Schools Council of the Roman Catholic Archdiocese of Boston. He served as Trustee Emeritus and Finance Committee Chair at Partners HealthCare from 1994 to 2000. Kaneb was a member of Harvard University's Executive Committee on University Resources. He died on August 29, 2021.
