= National Dairy Producers Union (Russia) =

National Dairy Producers Union (of Russia)
- Национальный союз производителей молока (СОЮЗМОЛОКО)
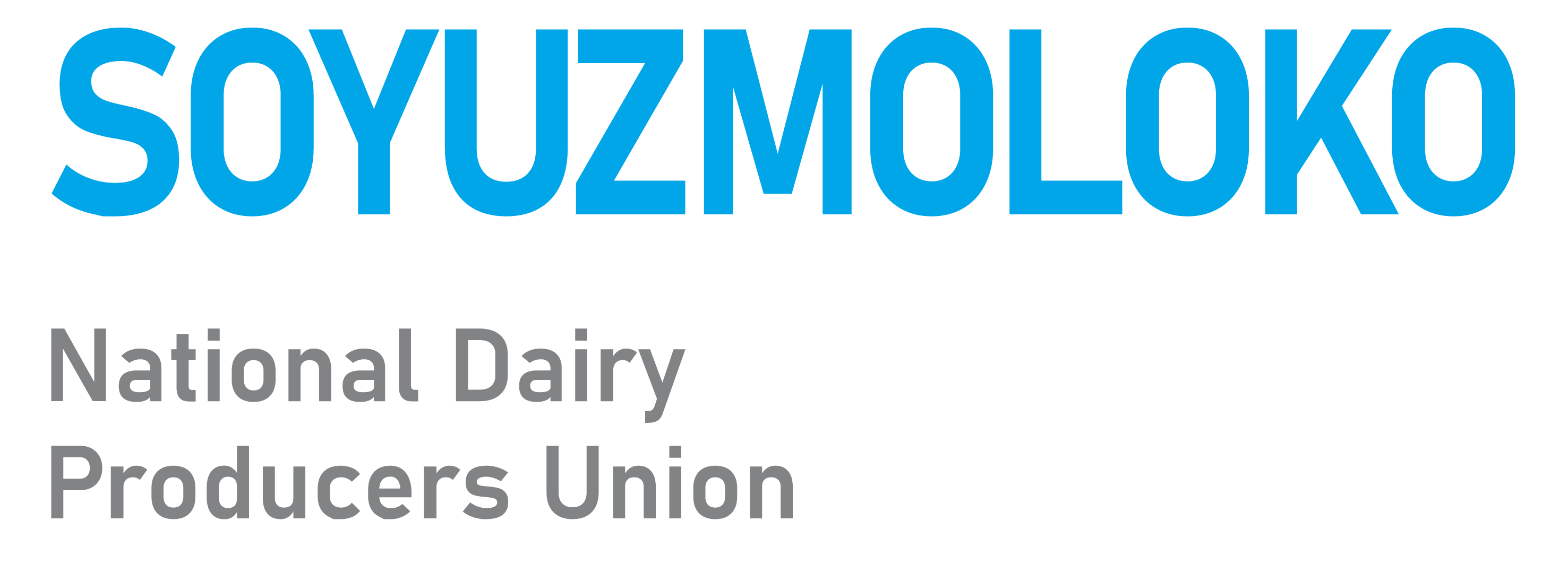
- Abbreviation: SOYUZMOLOKO
- Founded: March 21, 2008 (17–18 years)
- Headquarters: Moscow, Russia
- Location: Russian Federation
- Members: > 200
- Key people: Belov, Artyom; General Director
- Website: souzmoloko.ru (in Russian)

National Dairy Producers Union (SOYUZMOLOKO) (Russian: Национальный союз производителей молока (СОЮЗМОЛОКО)) is a nonprofit organization based in Moscow, Russia. SOYUZMOLOKO unites milk producers and dairy processors as well as numerous service companies to represent their interests thus providing the dairy industry in Russia with economically favorable conditions.

== Overview ==
Russian milk producers and dairy processors founded National Dairy Producers Union (abbreviated as SOYUZMOLOKO) in March 2008. The nonprofit business association is based in Moscow and advocates policies to executive and legislative authorities at both state and local levels, foreign agencies, other business organizations, the news media, and the public. As noted on the organization's website “The goal of SOYUZMOLOKO is to foster a favorable environment for milk production and dairy procession that allows the increase in quality of dairy and the effectiveness of the industry”. The Union currently represents over 200 milk producers, dairy processors and service companies, which account for over 70% of milk and dairy products of Russia.

== Activities ==
SOYUZMOLOKO was founded to provide a forum for dairy producers and related sector companies to discuss the existing challenges, cooperate and participate in public policy discussions. Therefore, the Union organizes conferences, face-to-face seminars, and webinars, as well as large-scale conventions, that focus on dairy industry topics. To ensure the interests of its members, on a daily basis the Union collects and analyzes dairy market information as well as food safety requirements and regulatory practices, provides milk producers and dairy processors with advisory services. Moreover, according to the Federal act “On the development of agriculture” (#264, 2006.29.12), SOYUZMOLOKO participates in Russian agricultural policy formation.

=== Quality control ===
National dairy producers union considers the production of safe and quality products as the primary means of increasing consumers’ confidence in the dairy. Therefore, the Union monitors the quality of products its members supply to distribution networks and facilitates the constant modernization of their plants. The nonprofit organization establishes and improves connections between milk producers, dairy processors and service companies, thus promoting the exchange of best practices and new technologies within the industry.

=== Dairy Promotion Program ===
SOYUZMOLOKO considers dairy products one of the fundamental components of a balanced human diet. Due to the obvious decrease in the dairy consumption level in Russia, the Union has launched the “Three dairy products per day” non-profit social program. The federal-level initiative is aimed at stimulating milk consumption and is implemented with the support of the Ministry of Agriculture of the Russian Federation and the Institute of Nutrition.

=== Export promotion ===
In May 2018, president Putin challenged the agricultural sector to increase the value of food exports to $45 billion by 2024, up from $26 billion in 2018. In line with the policy of the Russian Government, which supports national businesses in their participation in the foreign trade of agricultural products. SOYUZMOLOKO pays special attention to external economic activities of its members and assists them in their connections with foreign partners. Moreover, the organization monitors the opportunities abroad and identifies the existing challenges to dairy foreign trade operations to report on them to the national government.

== Governance ==
The first general meeting of the members of the National Dairy Producers Union took place on June 27, 2008. Alexey Gordeev, the then minister of agriculture of the Russian Federation, attended the event and expressed the view that "The National Dairy Producers Union should undertake a number of important functions, including the close liaising with executive legislation bodies in developing mechanisms of market regulation and price policy formation, attracting potential investors for the industry sector development, coordinating the launch of scientific and technical programs and innovations". Ayrat Khairullin, the first deputy chairman of the State Duma Committee on Agrarian Matters, was elected as the president, and Andrey Danilenko, the then president of the Russian Farms Group, was elected as the chairman of the board.

Nowadays the organization is governed by the general board, which is a collegial body that exercises general management and reports to the General Meeting of Union members. Former advisor to the Minister of Agriculture of the Russian Federation Artyom Belov, who was appointed a general director of the Union in February 2018, runs the daily routine. The same 10th general meeting of the members of the National Dairy Producers Union has elected Stefan Dürr, chairman of the board of Ekosem-Agrar AG and president of the Ekoniva Group, its new chairman. He replaced Andrey Danilenko, who had held this position for more than ten years.

== National Congresses of Milk Producers ==
Almost annually SOYUZMOLOKO holds National Congresses of Milk Producers which are considered to be the most representative meetings of the dairy industry in Russia. Such events are usually attended by federal and regional officials, representatives of business and non-profit organizations related to the production, processing, and marketing of milk.

On March 3, 2010, Moscow hosted the 1st Russian National Congress of milk producers, organized by the union. The congress brought together more than 500 delegates representing 65 Russian regions, as well as heads of ministries and agencies, relevant committees of both chambers of parliament and Russian regions, producers and processors of milk. The primary aim of congress was to stabilize the Russian dairy market and to discuss measures to stimulate the development of the industry in 2010–2012 and government measures to support the dairy industry. During the Congress, participants signed the Agreement on general principles of cooperation between producers and processors of milk within the National Dairy Producers Union. The General Committee of the Congress included the then deputy prime minister of the Russian Federation Viktor Zubkov, the then minister of agriculture Yelena Skrynnik, the then chairman of the board of SOYUZMOLOKO Andrey Danilenko, the president of SOYUZMOLOKO Airat Khairullin, and the then deputy minister of economic development of Russia Andrey Klepach.

== Membership ==
As of the end of 2019, the National Dairy Producers Union has over 200 members from more than 45 federal subjects. About 160 Union members produce raw milk.

== International activities ==
National Dairy Producers Union contributes to the competitiveness of the Russian dairy industry through active participation in events abroad and membership in a global network of specialized organizations. SOYUZMOLOKO joined the International Dairy Federation (IDF) in September 2019. The Union's general director Artyom Belov acts as a National Secretary of the Russian National Committee.

== See also ==
- Dairy
- Trade association
- Nonprofit organization
- Public relations
- European Dairy Association
- Dairy Promotion Program
