= Oste (surname) =

Oste is an Italian-language occupational surname literally meaning "innkeeper". Oste may also be the Swedish surname Öste without diacritics. Notable people with the surnames include:

- Joseph Julian Oste, bishop of the Roman Catholic Diocese of Rehe, China, 1948–1971
- Nemesi Marqués Oste (born 1935), Catholic priest, the personal representative to Andorra of the Bishop of Urgell from 1993 to 2012

== See also ==
- Öste, a Swedish language surname
