= Brigham's Ice Cream =

Brand of ice cream and restaurants

- Type: Private
- Industry: food manufacturer
- Founded: 1914; 112 years ago in Newton Highlands, Massachusetts
- Defunct: 2013; 13 years ago (as restaurant chain)
- Headquarters: Lynnfield, Massachusetts, United States
- Products: ice cream
- Parent: HP Hood LLC
- Website: brighams.com

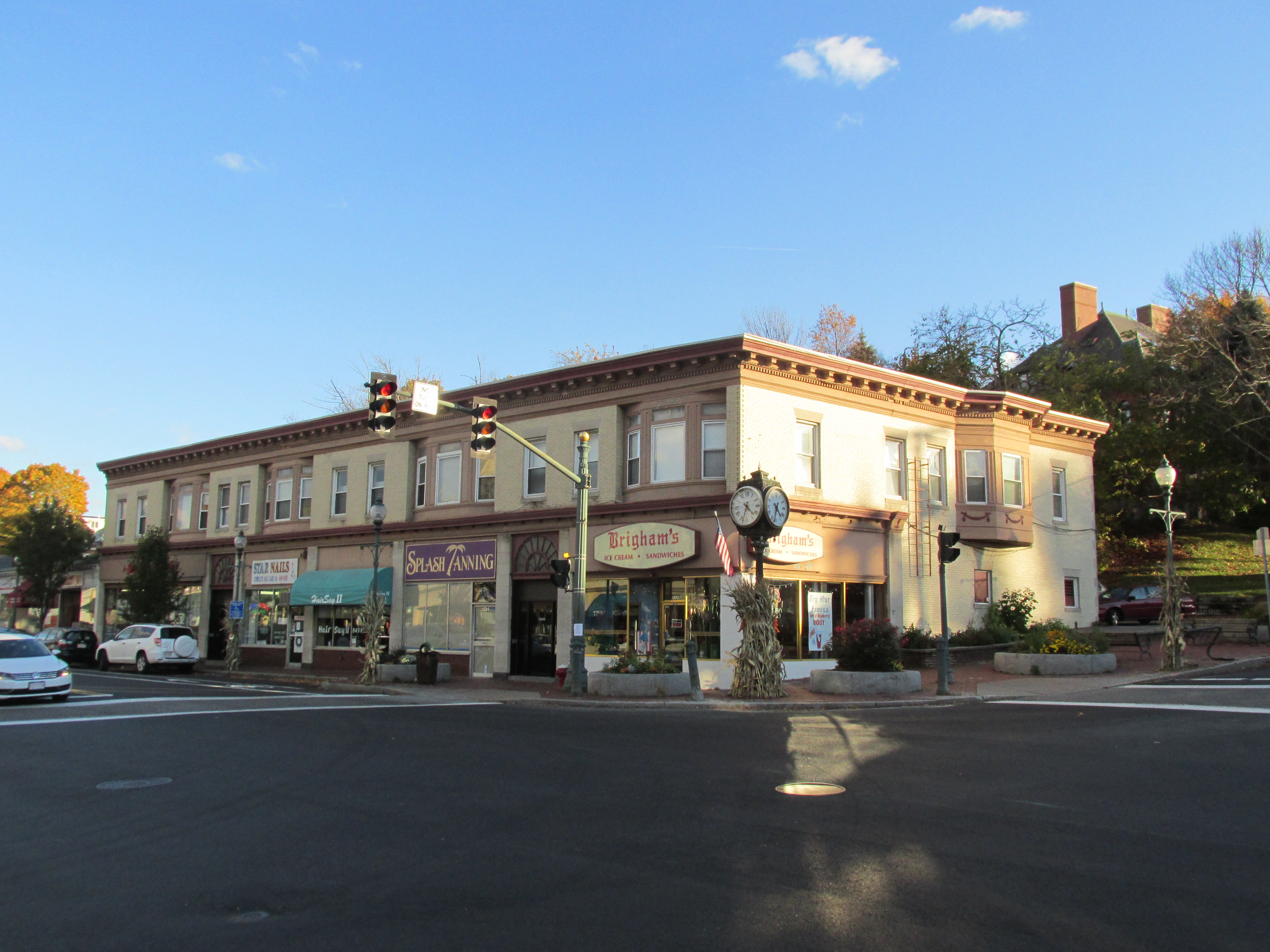
Former location at 1328 Massachusetts Avenue in Arlington Heights

Brigham's Ice Cream is a brand of ice cream and formerly a restaurant franchise. Brigham's is sold in quart containers throughout New England, and was served at franchised restaurants located in Massachusetts until 2013. It was founded in Newton Highlands, Massachusetts. Since the purchase by HP Hood, its offices are located at Kimball Lane, Lynnfield, Massachusetts. The company maintains a strong regional identity, using regional terms such as "wicked" (extremely) and "frappe" (milkshake with ice cream), and makes reference to events with special significance to New Englanders, such as the Big Dig and the 2004 World Series. At one time, there were 100 Brigham's restaurant locations; the last was in Arlington, Massachusetts, and changed its name in August 2015. The ice cream is currently owned and manufactured by Hood.

== History ==
Brigham's was founded in 1914 by Edward L. Brigham in Newton Highlands, Massachusetts. In 1914, Brigham opened a shop selling ice cream and candy which he made in the back of the store. Originally, ice cream was sold for five cents and sundaes for 20 cents. Brigham's ice cream became so popular that the local police were called upon to control weekend crowds. In 1929, Brigham's merged with Symmes' Durand Company, establishing the basis of today's Brigham's with the opening of three additional stores and an ice cream manufacturing plant. Throughout the 1930s and 1940s business flourished and 20 new stores opened.

In 1961, Brigham's was acquired by Star Market. Forty new stores opened, offering sandwiches and ice cream in a new colonial-style setting. Brigham's was acquired by Jewel Companies in 1964 when Jewel acquired Star. In 1968, Brigham's acquired Buttrick's, a small chain of colonial-style restaurants based in Arlington, Massachusetts. This location became the Brigham's new home office until its sale to HP Hood, at which time this location was closed. At its height, Brigham's had 100 restaurants in the New England area. In 1982, Jewel Companies sold Brigham's to privately held owners. Brigham's started selling quarts of its ice cream at retail in 1983; as of 2022, its ice cream is sold in every major supermarket in New England.

Brigham's bought Élan Frozen Yogurt in 1993, to expand and improve the menu towards the ever-growing frozen-dessert industry. The purchase enabled Brigham's to enter the New York region as well as additional demographic markets. In 2003, Brigham's launched its first novelty, the Brigham's Ice Cream Bar.

On June 27, 2008, in a secured creditor transaction led by the company's senior debt holder, Cambridge Savings Bank, Brigham's was split into two companies and sold to HP Hood LLC and Luke Cooper of Deal Metrics, LLC. Hood acquired the Brigham's brand name and all products, proprietary, flavors and recipes. In a separate deal, Brigham's agreed to sell its 28 retail outlets and restaurants to Baltimore-based Deal Metrics LLC, through its holding company, New England Food Service, LLC. The manufacturing of Brigham's Ice Cream for sale in supermarkets was sold to Hood. At that time there were about 21 locations.

Brigham's restaurants did not survive the merger and in 2009, the company filed for bankruptcy and eventually closed all company-owned restaurants. Franchised locations continued to operate until 2013, when the four remaining franchise locations (Arlington Heights, Hingham, North Andover, and Quincy) were forced to drop the brand from their store names. The Arlington Heights location became Diggums in August 2015 (closed in December 2016), the Hingham location became Patti's Place (since closed), Quincy became The Ice Cream Parlour, and the North Andover location is now called Fari's Diner.

Hood, identified as BIC Acquisitions, LLC, continues to market Brigham's ice cream in stores and owns the trademarks and official website.
