= Agway =

U.S. agriculture company

Agway of DeWitt, New York, was an American agricultural business that offered feed for livestock and poultry, as well as seed, fertilizers, and herbicides.

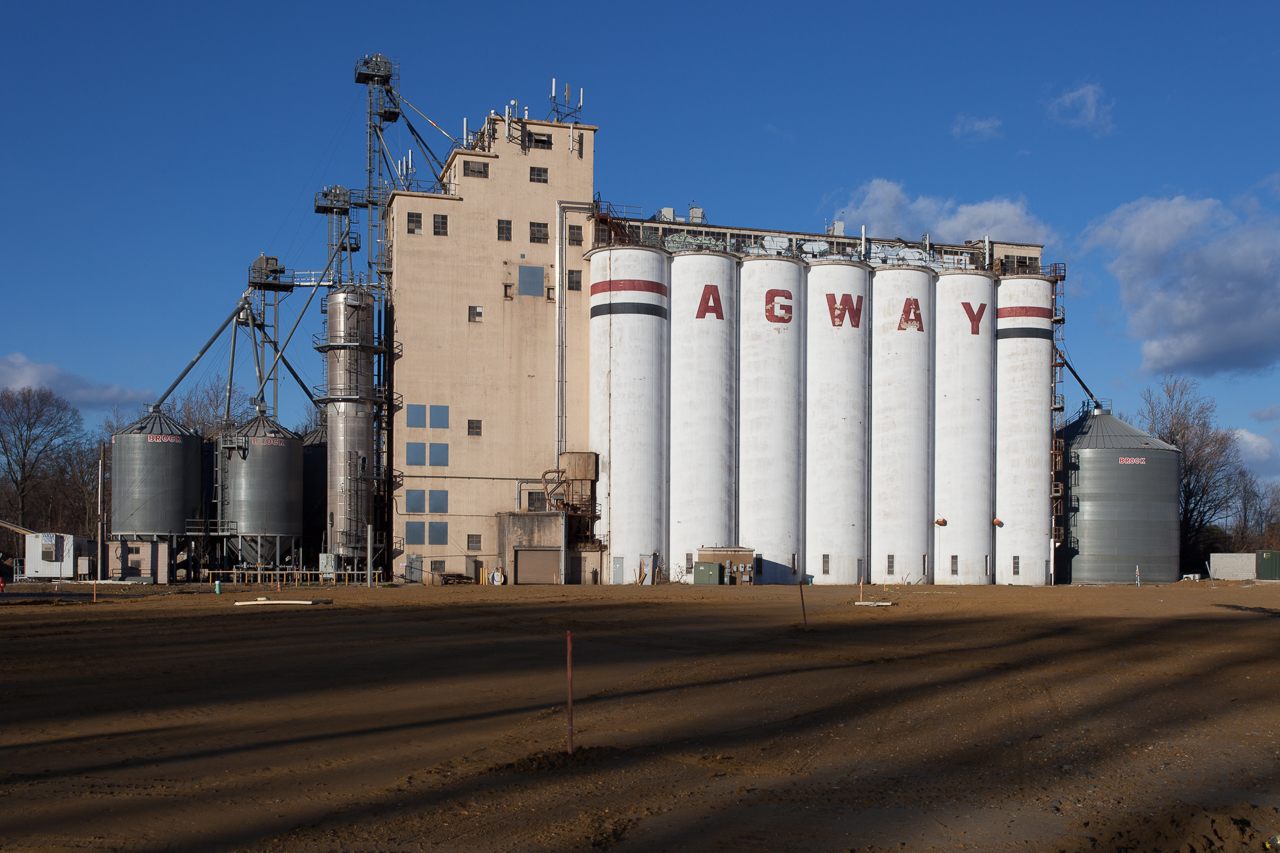
Agway Grain Silos on Route 130 in Bordentown, New Jersey.

== History ==
Agway was formed on July 25, 1964, from a merger between the Grange League Federation of Ithaca, New York and the Eastern States Farmers' Exchange. In 1965, the Pennsylvania Farm Bureau Cooperative merged into Agway.

In 1980, Agway purchased dairy company HP Hood of Lynnfield, Massachusetts. It was sold to Catamount Dairy Holdings of Boston in 1996 as part of downsizing due to overall financial losses since 1990. Agway also owned a significant share of Curtice-Burns Foods of Rochester, New York, from 1966 to 1994, part of the holding company Pro-Fac Cooperative from nearby Pittsford, New York, which included the Birds Eye frozen foods brand.

In 1999, Agway sold or closed all its retail outlets and sold its warehouse system to Southern States Cooperative.

On October 1, 2002, Agway filed for Chapter 11 bankruptcy. After the bankruptcy, the Agway brand name was owned by Southern States Cooperative.

On July 5, 2022, Agway Farm & Home Supply also filed for Chapter 11 bankruptcy, and announced that it would begin winding down all remaining assets and would be shutting down.

On November 1, 2022, True Value acquired the Agway trademark from Agway Farm & Home Supply.

On October 14, 2024, True Value filed for Chapter 11 bankruptcy protection as it continued to face significant liquidity challenges caused by inflation and rising interest rates. The company plans to sell itself to competitor Do It Best for $153 million.

In May 2025, it was announced that Smithland Pet & Garden Center, which acquired several Agway locations years prior, would be closing all 13 of their locations in Connecticut and Massachusetts.
