= Cold coffee =

Cold coffee may refer to:

- An undesirable form of hot coffee after it loses heat
- Iced coffee, a cold drink along the lines of iced tea
- Cold brew coffee, a specific method of brewing without heat, also served cold
- Cold Coffee, a 2016 album by Barrie-James O'Neill
- "Cold Coffee", a 2010 song by Ed Sheeran from Songs I Wrote with Amy
