= Southern States Cooperative =

American agricultural supply cooperative

- Type: Agricultural Cooperative
- Industry: Agricultural Supply, Energy, and Retail
- Founded: 1923
- Headquarters: Richmond, Virginia, United States
- Number of locations: Virginia, West Virginia, North Carolina, South Carolina, Maryland, Kentucky
- Area served: Southern United States
- Key people: Steve Becraft, CEO
- Products: Farm supplies, petroleum & bulk fuel, grass & vegetable seed, fertilizer, power equipment, pet & wild animal supplies, livestock supplies and feed, horse supplies and feed, fencing equipment, apparel and more
- Services: Seed, feed, fertilizer, crop protectants, precision ag, livestock health, equine health, farm supplies, farm and home fuels
- Website: southernstates.com

Southern States Cooperative is an American farmer-owned agricultural supply cooperative headquartered in the Richmond, Virginia area. Southern States Cooperative supplies small, medium, and large commercial farmers with livestock and animal feed, pasture seed, vegetable seed, farm fertilizers, farm supplies, bulk fuel, and crop services, including information and products to grow better crops. They also supply homeowners with information and products for their lawn, garden, hobby farm, and home.

Southern States is a $1.5 billion agribusiness with over 200,000 farmer-members and serves over 1,200 retail outlets across 21 states.

== Company history ==
Southern States Cooperative was founded in 1923 as the Virginia Seed Service by 150 farmers in Richmond, Virginia to help develop seeds. It expanded to distribution of feed in 1925, fertilizer in 1926 and farm supplies and petroleum shortly after.

At the time, farmers in Virginia were unable to buy seed guaranteed to grow in the Commonwealth. Despite scientific findings about the correlation between the quality of seeds and the quality of crops they produced, commercial seed handlers continued to sell poor-quality seed. In 1923, about 150 farmers met in Richmond to take steps to remedy the situation. These 150 farmers, calling their cooperative Virginia Seed Service (VSS), found that pooling their resources enabled them to procure seeds better suited to Virginia's growing conditions.

VSS began distributing feed in 1925, added a fertilizer service in 1926 and started handling farm supplies and petroleum products a few years later. In the early 1930s, VSS was looking beyond Virginia and changed its name to Southern States Cooperative. Soon other states were served including Delaware and Maryland in 1934, West Virginia in 1941, Kentucky in 1945 and North Carolina in 1986.

Improvements in service also came quickly. In 1948, the cooperative established its first hybrid corn research program. Six years later, realizing it could no longer rely solely on college research, Southern States helped establish a chain of feed testing and research farms located across the country. And in 1960, Southern States and ten other regional co-ops formed a national seed-breeding research organization, FFR.

In 1978, Southern States moved its headquarters from downtown Richmond to the Brookfield office park in Henrico County.

In 2018 Southern States sold its headquarters building at 6606 W. Broad St. to Thalhimer Realty Partners for approximately $15 million. The deal included the 40 year old, eight-story, 206,000-square-foot office building, along with its surrounding 11.8-acre parcel. Southern States remains the anchor tenant in the building now renamed Brookfield Place.

== Acquisitions and subsidiaries ==
In the early 1950s Southern States partnered with two other regional agribusinesses to purchase an oil refinery in Texas City. The facility was renamed Texas City Refining, Inc. in 1951. In 1960 Texas City Refining, Inc. bought an adjacent refinery and terminal from Sid Richardson. In 1964 one of Texas City Refining Inc. owners, the Grange League Federation, merged with Eastern States Farmers Exchange to become Agway. In 1965 Agway merged with another of Texas City Refining Inc.'s owners, the Pennsylvania Farm Bureau, leaving Agway and Southern States as owners. The co-ops sold the 130,000 barrel-a-day refinery and two terminals in 1988.

In 1990, Southern States bought the Wetsel Seed Company of Harrisonburg, Virginia, a family owned seed company founded in 1911, which became a subsidiary of Southern States. Five years later, the company’s name was changed to Wetsel Inc. Southern States sold the business in 2003.

In October 1998, Southern States continued its growth by acquiring the wholesale and retail farm supply system of Gold Kist, Inc. The acquisition effectively expanded the co-op's territory into the Southeastern part of the nation.

Also in 1998 Southern States acquired Michigan Livestock Exchange

Two years later, Southern States purchased the wholesale business of Agway consumer dealers and assumed all dealer marketing, development, operations, distribution and logistics for this business. The acquisition included a dealer network in Maine, Vermont, New Hampshire, New York, Massachusetts, Connecticut, New Jersey, Rhode Island, Pennsylvania, Maryland, and Delaware, and a customer service center in Syracuse, New York, as well as distribution facilities.

In August 2017 Southern States sold 20 farm-supply locations in Georgia and Florida and its integrated cotton ginning business in Statesboro, Georgia to Agrium.

Also in August 2017, Southern States agreed to sell its animal feed production business to agribusiness Cargill, Inc. though Southern States continues to sell a wide assortment of bulk and bagged feed at retail.
