= Osti (surname) =

The surname Osti or Osty may refer to:

- Carlo Osti (born 1958), Italian footballer
- Eugène Osty (1874–1938), French physician and psychical researcher
- Éva Osty, birth name of Éva Darlan (born 1948), French actress
- Jean Osty (1920–2011), pen name Jean Lartéguy, French writer, journalist and former soldier
- Josip Osti (1945–2021), Bosnian poet, prose writer and essayist, literary critic, anthologist and translator
- Massimo Osti (1944–2005), Italian garment engineer
