= HP Hood =

American dairy company

- Type: Private
- Industry: Food
- Founded: 1846; 180 years ago Derry, New Hampshire, United States
- Founder: Harvey Perley Hood
- Headquarters: Lynnfield, Massachusetts, United States
- Area served: United States and International Locations
- Key people: Gary Kaneb (president)
- Products: Dairy
- Revenue: $3.5 billion
- Owner: The Kaneb Family
- Number of employees: More than 3,400
- Subsidiaries: see list of brands below
- Website: hood.com

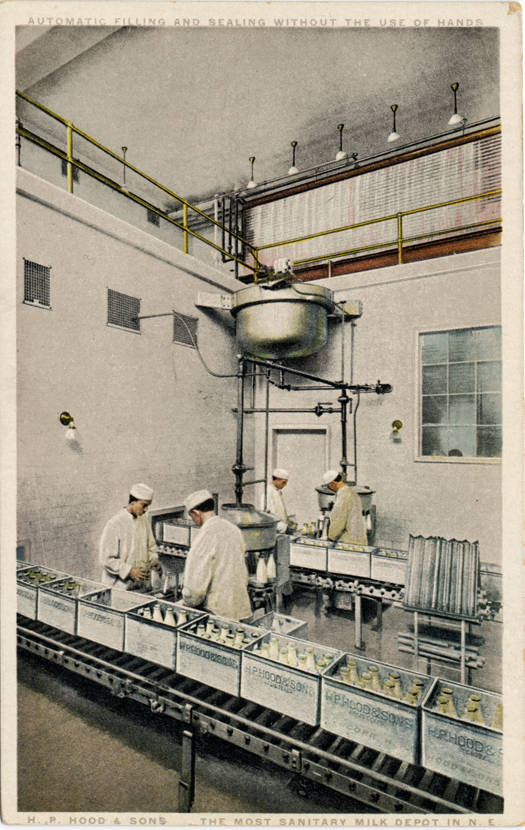
The most sanitary milk depot in New England, early 20th Century

HP Hood LLC is an American dairy company based in Lynnfield, Massachusetts. Hood was founded in 1846 in Derry, New Hampshire, by Harvey Perley Hood. After two years in Derry, Hood took his milk south and established a factory in Charlestown, Massachusetts. Recent company acquisitions by HP Hood have expanded its reach from predominantly New England to the broader United States. Today, the company has annual sales revenue of over $3 billion and more than 3,400 employees.

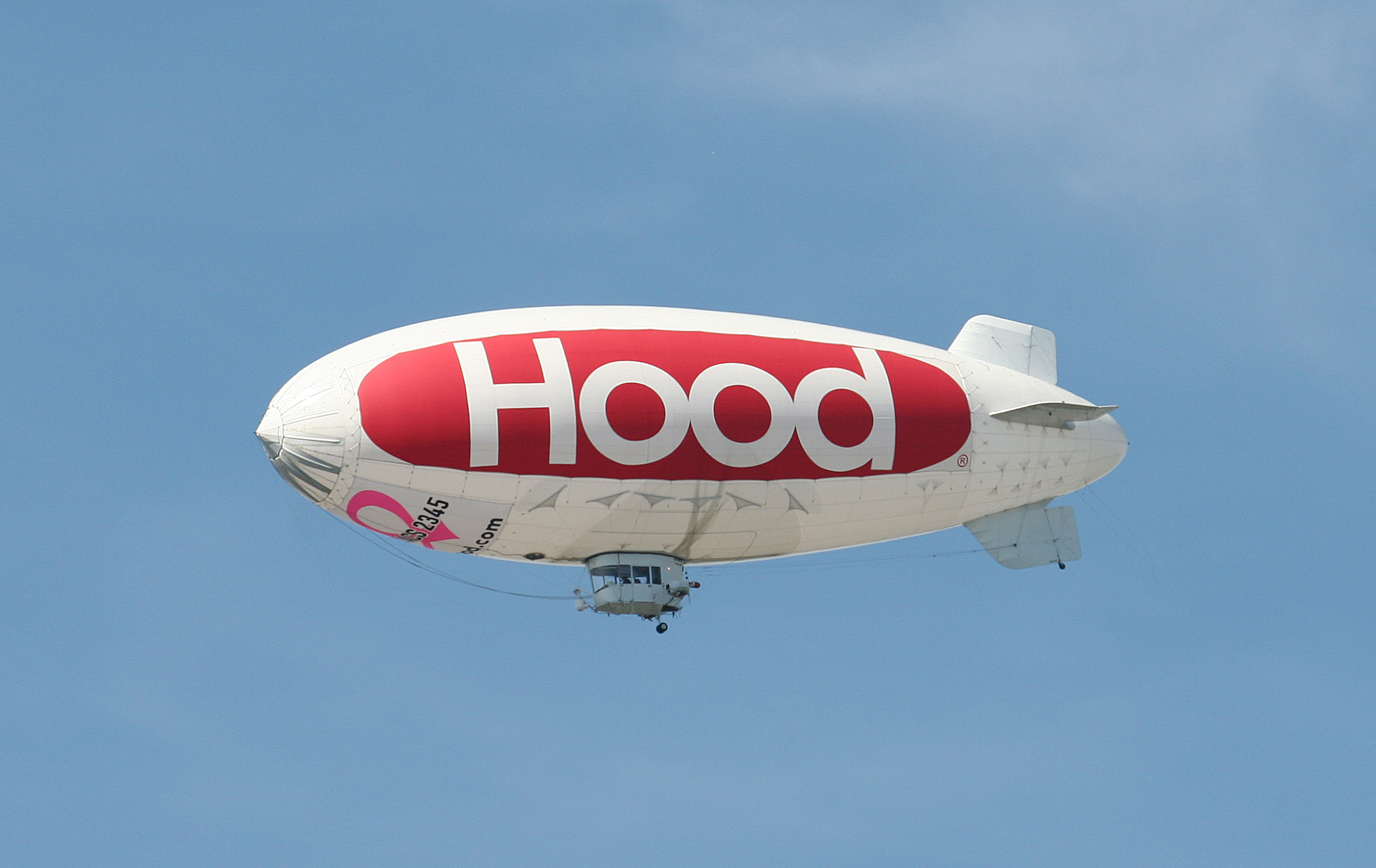
Hood Blimp - 2005

From 1980 to 1995, HP Hood was owned by Agway. That year, the company was acquired by the Kaneb Family. HP Hood is an independently owned, private company and was listed at #169 on the Forbes "America's Largest Private Companies" list for 2025.

== History ==
In 1984, HP Hood was the first dairy to bring Lactaid-branded milk to the New England market; entrepreneur Alan Kligerman had introduced the Lactaid brand of lactase dietary supplements in 1977 and then started to license the brand to dairies in 1982. In 1987, HP Hood, which had always been focused on New England, went nationwide for the first time with a low-fat ice milk product, Hood Light.

In early 1991, Kligerman licensed the Lactaid brand to Johnson & Johnson subsidiary McNeil, which launched a massive advertising campaign that turned Lactaid into J&J's fastest-growing brand of the 1990s. That same year, under McNeil's supervision of the brand, HP Hood became the official supplier of Lactaid milk for the East Coast of the United States.

In 2001, HP Hood renegotiated its contract with McNeil and became the official supplier of Lactaid milk for the entire United States market. By 2004, Lactaid was the No. 1 national brand of milk in the United States.

In 2004, the company acquired Crowley Foods, based in Binghamton, New York; and Kemps, based in St. Paul, Minnesota. In 2007, HP Hood acquired Crystal Cream and Butter Company, based in Sacramento, California, but then sold it that same year to Foster Farms Dairy. In 2008, they acquired the ice cream business of Brigham's Ice Cream, based in Arlington, Massachusetts. These acquisitions effectively expanded the company's reach from New England and New York to the broader United States.

In 2017, the company purchased a former Muller Quaker plant in Batavia, New York. In 2022, the company purchased land in Greenville, Texas, and has plans to expand capacity.

== Brands ==
=== Current brands ===
- Hood
- Crowley Foods
- Heluva Good!
- Axelrod Foods
- Booth Brothers Dairy
- Green's Ice Cream
- Brigham's Ice Cream
- Hagan Ice Cream
- Planet Oat
- La Terra Fina
- Lactaid (brand of McNeil Nutritionals, LLC produced by HP Hood since 1984)
- Blue Diamond Almond Breeze (brand of Blue Diamond Growers produced by HP Hood since 2008)
- Southern Comfort Eggnog

=== Former brands ===
- Kemps (sold to Dairy Farmers of America in 2011)
  - Goodrich Ice Cream
- Rosenberger's Dairy (sold to Balford Farms in 2014)
  - Rosenberger's Dairy Wagon
- Penn Maid Foods (Discontinued at the end of 2023)

== Iconography ==
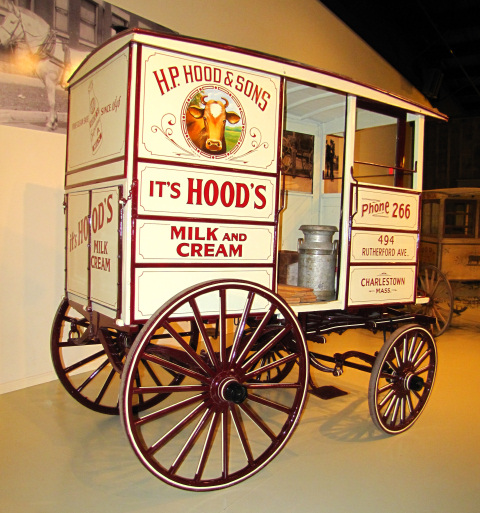
H.P. Hood & Sons delivery wagon on display at the Owl's Head Museum

HP Hood and the logo is a well known New England company. The smoke stack marked "Hoods Milk" at their former facility near Sullivan Square, Charlestown remains a landmark. The 20-acre facility is being redeveloped as a mixed residential-commercial campus called the "Hood Park".

The company ran a highway safety campaign called Hood Samaritan (see Good Samaritan) circa 1960, that was later taken over by the CVS Pharmacy chain.

At Boston Children's Museum, the outdoor ice cream stand takes the form of a large Hood Milk Bottle. The Hood blimp often appears at sport and cultural events (most often Red Sox home games above Boston, and the Eastern States Exposition in October). The Hood blimp made news on September 26, 2006 when it crashed in a wooded area near Manchester-by-the-Sea, Massachusetts.

The Hoodsie cup, a small cardboard cup of ice cream, is an iconic product; the term "Hoodsie" is occasionally cited as a shibboleth of the Boston-area dialect.

A United States Supreme Court case, H.P. Hood & Sons v. Du Mond, was decided in the Hood Company's favor, in which the State of New York was prevented from withholding a license to acquire milk produced in New York, and sold in Massachusetts, based on the dormant commerce clause limitations on state intervention in interstate commerce.

The company and their logo served as somewhat of an inspiration to the popular Phish tune "Harry Hood".

== See also ==
- John A. Kaneb
