= Rickard Öste =

Swedish food scientist

- Born: 11 June 1948 (age 78)
- Known for: Invention of oat milk
- Awards: Polhem Prize
- Scientific career
- Workplaces: Oatly; Lund University

Rickard Öste (11 June 1948) is a Swedish scientist and businessman, the inventor of oat milk, and the co-founder of Oatly, a Swedish food company making oat milk products.

In 1994, Öste co-founded Oatly with his brother Björn. The parent company of Oatly AB is Ceba AB, which was founded by Öste in 1994, and he is the majority owner. Another Ceba subsidiary is Aventure AB, a research company. In 1993, Öste also founded Agrovision AB.

Öste is professor emeritus in Lund University's Department of Food Technology, Engineering and Nutrition. Öste spends 20% of his time at Lund University.

In 2021, Öste along with his collaborator Angeliki Triantafyllou won the Polhem Prize for their work on oat-based foodstuff.
