= European Dairy Association =

Trade association for dairies in the European Union

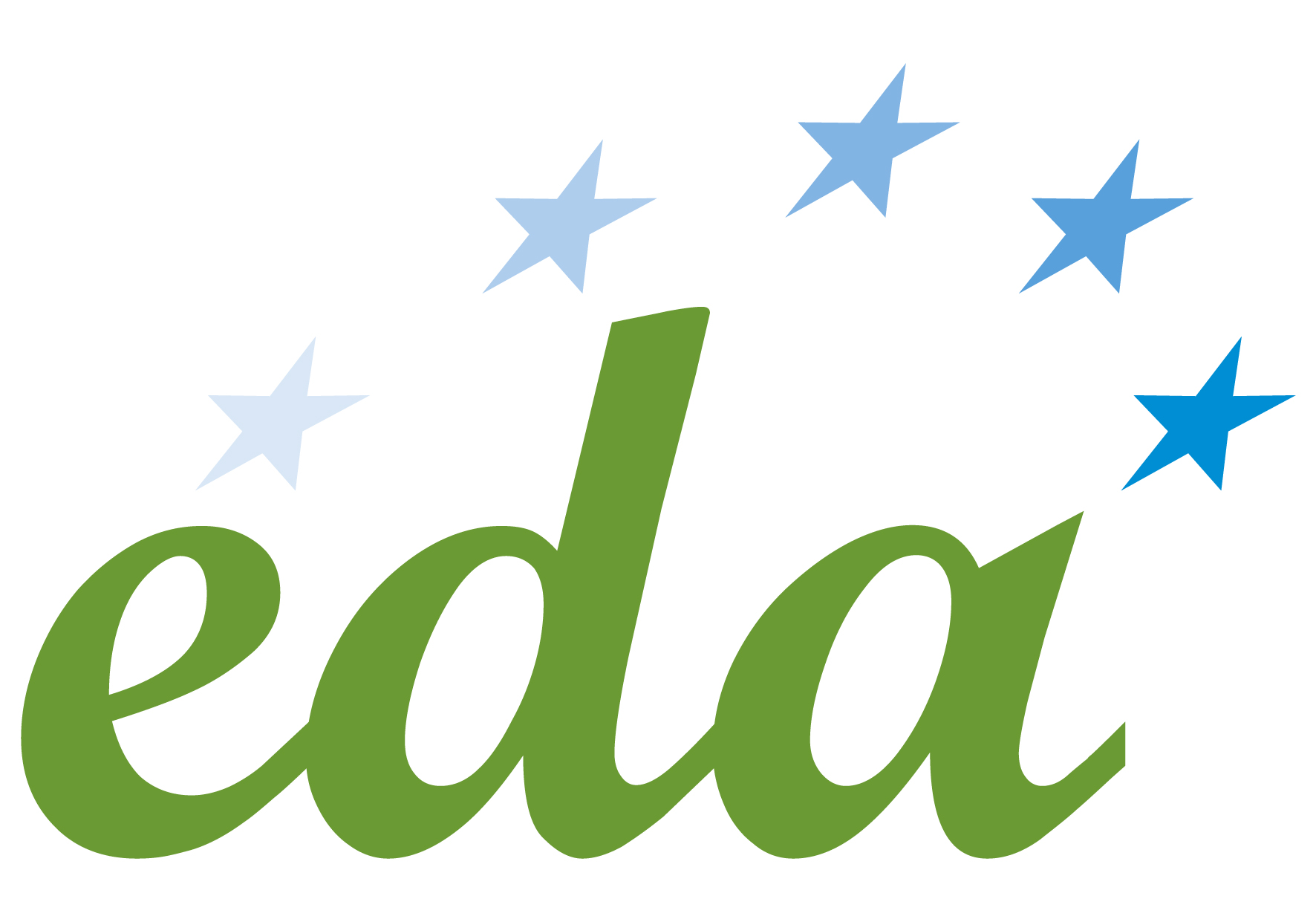
European Dairy Association (logo)

The European Dairy Association (EDA) is the trade association representing the milk processing industry in the European Union, including both cooperative and private dairies. Registered as an international non-profit association under Belgian law (AISBL), it brings together national federations of dairy processing companies across Europe. The EDA represents the sector's interests and engages in advocacy with the European institutions. It is listed in the EU Transparency Register under number 42967152383-63. Its headquarters are located in the European Quarter of Brussels, Belgium.

== History ==
EDA was established in 1995, following the merger of several national dairy associations, including ASSILEC, its predecessor organisation. Its founding members were the national federations representing the dairy industry in the 15 original Member States of the European Union (EU-15).

Since its inception, the EDA has evolved alongside the enlargement of the European Union and the deepening of EU policies. Today, it comprises 22 national organisations that represent the interests of dairy processors across all 27 EU countries, supported by the active involvement of numerous European stakeholders in the sector.

In terms of governance, Michel Nalet (Lactalis, France) was elected President of the EDA in 2012, followed by Giuseppe Ambrosi (CEO of Ambrosi SpA, Italy) in March 2021, Albert de Groot (Vreugdenhil, Netherlands) in March 2025 and Koert Verkerk (Netherlands, FrieslandCampina) in October 2026. Since 2013, the position of Secretary General has been held by Alexander Anton.

== Action ==
The EDA represents the priorities of the dairy processing industry at the EU level and seeks to influence European strategies through lobbying. Acting on behalf of, and in close cooperation with its members (national dairy associations), the association acts and interacts with international and EU institutions, non-governmental organisations, international media and other stakeholders (Codex Alimentarius, World Trade Organization).

EDA is registered in the lobbies register, also known as the transparency register, under the number 42967152383-63. Since the creation of the European Commission's Milk Market Observatory (MMO) on 16 April 2014, EDA has been a member of this observatory.

Since 2014, its headquarters have been located in the European Quarter in Brussels, near the Robert Schuman roundabout and the European Commission's Berlaymont building.

== Organisation ==
EDA is governed by a Board of Directors, elected every two years by the General Assembly, with one representative from each member organisation. The operational management is overseen by the Secretary General, Alexander Anton, and the Secretariat based in Brussels. The EDA is structured into two departments: Trade and Economics, and Food, Environment and Health.

Within these departments, several working groups focus on specific sectors and topics such as the Common Agricultural Policy, market management, competitiveness, reform of the school milk scheme, protection of dairy designations, communication on the nutritional benefits of dairy products, inclusion of the dairy sector in the European Emissions Trading Scheme (ETS), and waste management.

The association maintains close contact with DG AGRI ("the Directorate-General for Agriculture and Rural Development"), DG SANTE, and DG GROW. Civil dialogue groups facilitate regular communication with the European Commission on all matters related to the Common Agricultural Policy, including rural development and its implementation.

The European Dairy Association (EDA) holds its Annual General Meeting. The last Annual General Meeting was held in November 2024 in Rome (Italy), and the next will be held in November 2025 in Utrecht.

== Presidents ==
Term of office	President
1995-1998	Fin Christiansen (DK)
1998-1999	Luc Morelon (FR)
1999-2004	Robert Brzusczak (BE)
2004-2008	Veijo Merilainen (FI)
2008-2012	Werner Buck (NL)
2012-2021	Michel Nalet (FR)
2021-2025	Giuseppe Ambrosi (IT)
2025-2026	Albert de Groot (NL)
2026-today	Koert Verkerk (NL)

Term of office	Secretary General
1995-2002	Antoon. J van de Ven (NL)
2002-2013	Johan Kleibeuker (NL)
2013-Today	Alexander Anton (FR/DE)

== Membership ==
The membership of the European Dairy Association (EDA) is composed of the national dairy associations representing the national dairy processors (private companies and cooperatives).

- Austria: Vereinigung Osterreichischer Milchverarbeiter (VÖM)
- Belgium: Confédération belge de l'industrie laitière (CBL)
- Germany: Milchindustrie-Verband (MIV)
- France: Association de la production laitière (ATLA)
- Czech Republic: Czech Moravian
- Denmark: Mejeriforeningen
- Estonia: Eesti Piimaliit
- Finland: Finnish Milk Processors and Dairy
- Greece: SEVGAP (Hellenic Association of Milk and Dairy Products Industry)
- Ireland: Irish Dairy Industries Association (IDIA)
- Italy: ASSOLATTE
- Luxembourg: Association laitière Luxembourgeoise (A.L.L)
- Netherlands: Nederlandse Zuivel Organisatie (NZO)
- Poland: Zwiazek Polskich Przetworcow Mlka (ZPPM)
- Portugal: Federaçao Nacional das Cooperativas de Productores de Leite (FENALAC)
- Slovenia: Slovene Dairy association
- Spain: Federacion National de Industrias Lacteas (FENIL)
- Sweden: Federacion of Swedish Farmers
- UK: Dairy UK

The EDA is a member of the EU umbrella organisation FoodDrinkEurope.
