= Vow (disambiguation) =

A vow is an oath or promise.

Vow, Vows or The Vow may also refer to:

- The Vow (devolution promise), a joint statement in the 2014 Scottish independence referendum

== Books ==
- The Vow, romance novel by Linda Lael Miller (1998)
- The Vow, novel by Denene Millner
- The Vow, romance novel by Rebecca Winters (2008)

== Film and TV ==
- The Vow (1937 film), a Polish drama film
- The Vow (1946 film), a Soviet Stalinist propaganda film directed by Mikhail Chiaureli
- The Vow (1950 film), an Italian drama film directed by Mario Bonnard
- The Vow (2012 film), a film directed by Michael Sucsy
- The Vow (TV series), a HBO documentary series
- La Promesa, in English, The Vow, a Spanish period television soap opera
- The Vows, a 1973 film directed by António de Macedo
- The Vow, international title of the Indian soap opera Banoo Main Teri Dulhann
- "Vows" (Dollhouse), an episode of the American science fiction television series Dollhouse
- The Vow, an edition of Monstress (comics)

== Music ==
- Vows (band), American psychedelic band
- Vows (album), a 2011 album by Kimbra

=== Songs ===
- "The Vow" (song), a 1983 song by Toyah
- "Vow" (song), a 1994 song by Garbage
- Vow, a song by Kutless from the album Kutless
- The Vow, a song by LL Cool J from his 2024 album The FORCE

== Other uses ==
- VOW Vertrokken onbekend waarheen, a Dutch term meaning "left town, destination unknown", used in Dutch resident registrations
- Volkswagen Group’s Frankfurt Stock Exchange stock symbol
- Vow (company), an Australian cultured meat company
