= Cultured meat =

Animal flesh produced by culturing cells

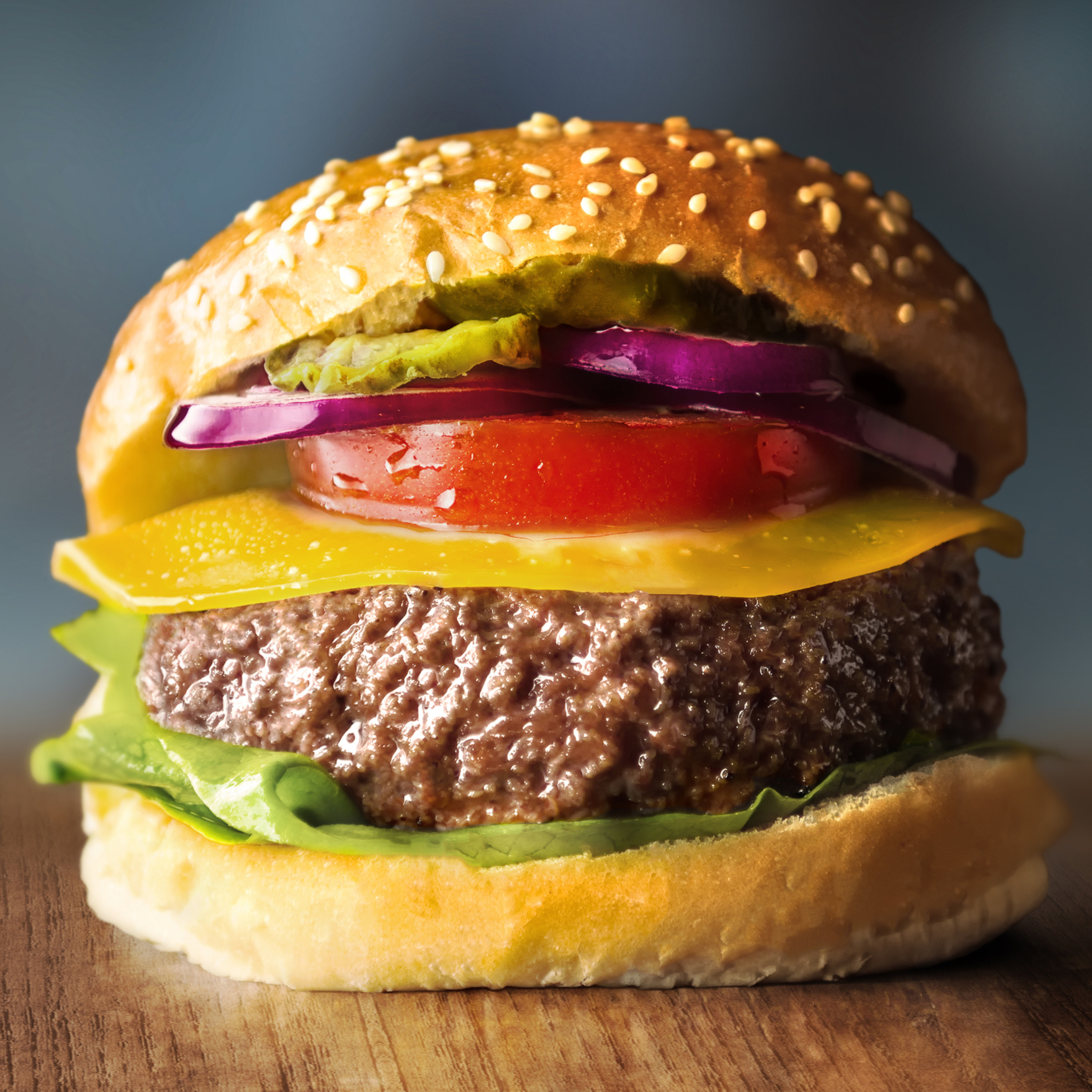
The first cell-cultured hamburger, cooked at a news conference in London, 2013

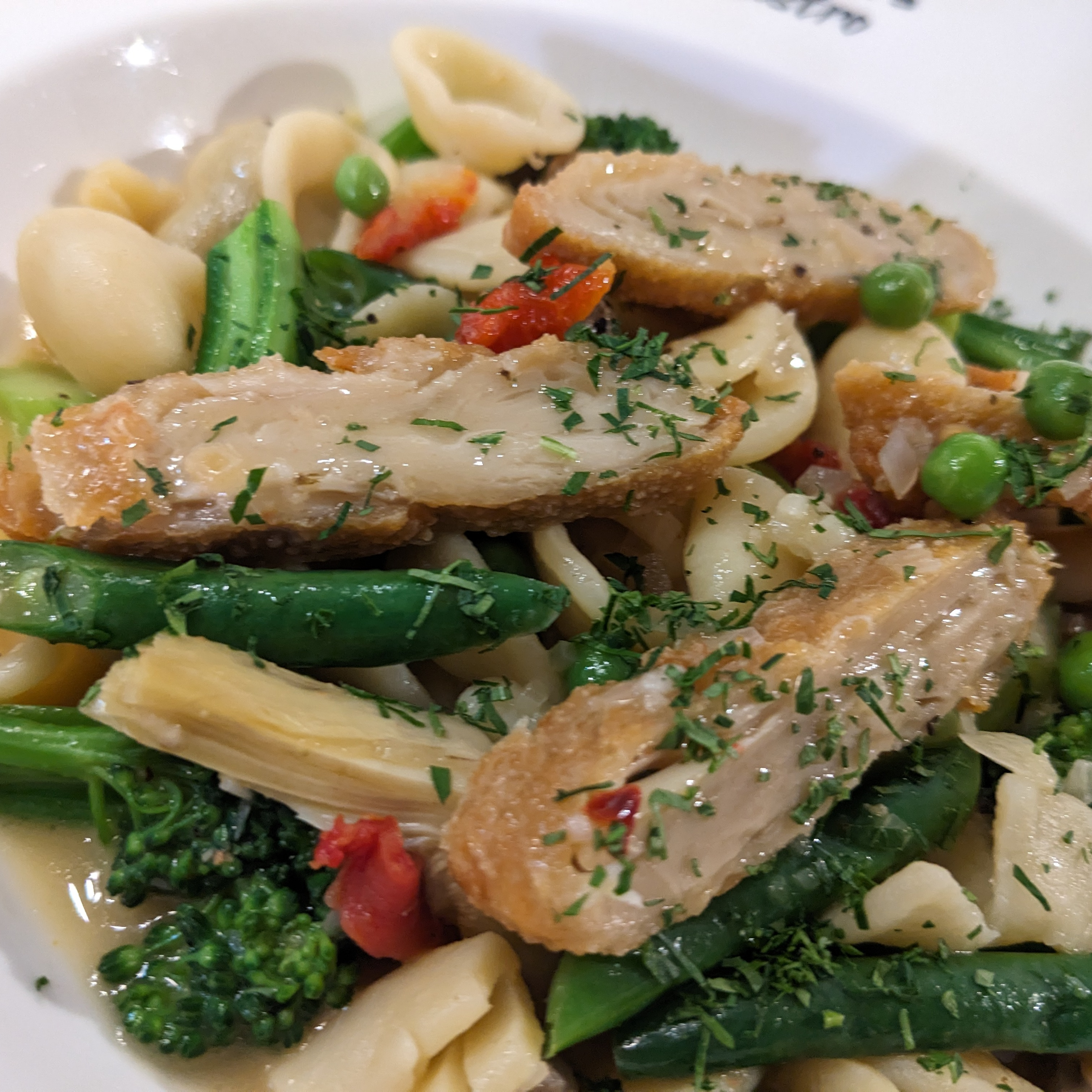
Cultured chicken in pasta salad, served at a restaurant in Singapore, 2023

Cultured meat, also known as cultivated meat among other names, is a form of cellular agriculture wherein meat is produced by culturing animal cells in vitro. This production method involves the molecularly identical growth of animal flesh, outside of a living animal. Cultured meat is produced using tissue engineering techniques pioneered in regenerative medicine. It is known for its potential to mitigate the environmental impact of meat production, as well as to address issues related to animal welfare, food security, and human health. Its potential has long been of interest, including to British statesman Winston Churchill in 1931.

Mark Post of the University of Maastricht presents The Meat Revolution, a lecture about cultured meat, 2015

Isha Datar of New Harvest on how a "post-animal bio-economy" can be brought about through cultured meat, eggs, and milk, 2017

Jason Matheny popularized the concept in the early 2000s after he co-authored a paper on cultured meat production and created New Harvest, the world's first non-profit organization dedicated to in vitro meat research. In 2013, Mark Post created a hamburger patty made from tissue grown outside of an animal; other cultured meat prototypes have gained media attention since. In 2020, SuperMeat opened a farm-to-fork restaurant in Tel Aviv called The Chicken, serving cultured chicken burgers in exchange for reviews to test consumer reaction rather than money; while the "world's first commercial sale of cell-cultured meat" occurred in December 2020 at Singapore restaurant 1880, where cultured chicken manufactured by United States firm Eat Just was sold.

Most efforts focus on common meats such as pork, beef, and chicken; species which constitute the bulk of conventional meat consumption in developed countries. Some companies have pursued various species of fish and other seafood, such as Avant Meats who brought cultured grouper to market in 2021. Other companies such as Orbillion Bio have focused on high-end or unusual meats including elk, lamb, bison, and Wagyu beef.

The production process of cultured meat is constantly evolving, driven by companies and research institutions. The applications for cultured meat have led to ethical, health, environmental, cultural, and economic discussions. Data published by The Good Food Institute found that in 2021 through 2023, cultured meat and seafood companies attracted over $2.5 billion in investment worldwide. However, cultured meat is not yet widely available.

In January 2024, a study demonstrated that cow cells can produce their own growth factors and do not require the expensive recombinant growth factors or fetal bovine serum.

In November 2025, a study demonstrated that cow cells can be spontaneously immortalized after 500 days without genetic modification, similar to how chicken cells are readily spontaneously immortalized in culture.

== Nomenclature ==
Besides cultured meat, the terms cultivated meat, clean meat, in vitro meat, cell-based meat, synthetic meat, slaughter-free meat, craft meat, healthy meat, and schmeat have been used to describe the product. Although it has multiple meanings, artificial meat is occasionally used. The term lab-grown meat has been used in news media, but has been criticized on the basis that as production reaches market-scale, it won't be grown in laboratories but rather larger-output facilities which Bruce Friedrich compares to "meat breweries".

Between 2016 and 2019, clean meat gained traction. The Good Food Institute (GFI) coined the term in 2016, and in late 2018, the institute published research arguing that use of clean better reflected the production process and benefits. By 2018 it had surpassed cultured and in vitro in media mentions and Google searches. Some stakeholders in cultured meat production, seeking to work with conventional meat producers as allies, felt that the term clean meat unnecessarily tarnished the latter, and went on to prefer cell-based meat as a neutral alternative.

In September 2019, GFI announced new research suggesting that the term cultivated meat is sufficiently descriptive and differentiating, possesses a high degree of neutrality, and ranks highly for consumer appeal. A September 2021 poll indicated that the majority of industry CEOs have a preference for cultivated meat, with 75 percent of 44 companies preferring it.

== History ==
=== Initial research ===
The theoretical possibility of growing meat in an industrial setting has long been of interest. In a 1931 essay published by various periodicals and later included in his work Thoughts and Adventures, British statesman Winston Churchill wrote: "We shall escape the absurdity of growing a whole chicken to eat the breast or wing, by growing these parts separately under a suitable medium."

In the 1950s, Dutch researcher Willem van Eelen independently came up with the idea for cultured meat. As a prisoner of war during the Second World War, Van Eelen suffered from starvation, leaving him passionate about food production and food security. He attended a university lecture discussing the prospects of preserved meat. The earlier discovery of cell lines provided the basis for the idea. In vitro cultivation of muscle fibers was first performed successfully in 1971 when pathologist Russell Ross cultured guinea pig aorta. In 1991, Jon F. Vein secured patent US 6835390 for the production of tissue-engineered meat for human consumption, wherein muscle and fat would be grown in an integrated fashion to create food products.

In 2001, dermatologist Wiete Westerhof along with van Eelen and businessperson Willem van Kooten announced that they had filed for a worldwide patent on a process to produce cultured meat. The process employed a matrix of collagen seeded with muscle cells bathed in a nutritious solution and induced to divide. In 2002, researchers published the results of a NASA-funded experiment in which goldfish muscle tissue was cultivated, with the objective of exploring possible uses for cultured meat on space missions. In 2003, Oron Catts and Ionat Zurr exhibited a few centimeters of "steak", grown from frog stem cells, which they cooked and ate. The goal was to start a conversation surrounding the ethics of cultured meat—"was it ever alive?", "was it ever killed?", "is it in any way disrespectful to an animal to throw it away?"

In the early 2000s, American public health student Jason Matheny traveled to India and visited a factory chicken farm. Appalled by the implications of this system, he later teamed up with three scientists involved in NASA's efforts. In 2004, Matheny founded New Harvest to encourage development by funding research. In 2005, Jason Matheny, Pieter Edelman, Douglas McFarland & Vladimir Mironov published the first peer-reviewed literature on the subject (In vitro cultured meat production) in Tissue Engineering.

In May 2008, PETA offered a $1 million prize to the first company to bring cultured chicken meat to consumers by 2012. The contestant was required to complete two tasks to earn the prize, namely to produce a cultured chicken meat product that was indistinguishable from real chicken and produce the product in large enough quantities to be competitively sold in at least 10 states. The contest was later extended until 4 March 2014. The deadline eventually expired without a winner.

The Dutch government has invested $4 million into experiments regarding cultured meat. The In Vitro Meat Consortium, a group formed by international researchers, held the first international conference hosted by the Norwegian Food Research Institute in April 2008. Time magazine declared cultured meat production to be one of the 50 breakthrough ideas of 2009. In November 2009, scientists from the Netherlands announced they had managed to grow meat using cells from a live pig.

=== First public trial ===
The first cultured beef burger patty was created by Mark Post at Maastricht University in 2013. It was made from over 20,000 thin strands of muscle tissue, cost over $325,000 and needed 2 years to produce. The burger was tested on live television in London on 5 August 2013. It was cooked by chef Richard McGeown of Couch's Great House Restaurant in Polperro, Cornwall, and tasted by critics Hanni Rützler, a food researcher from the Future Food Studio, and Josh Schonwald. Rützler stated, "There is really a bite to it, there is quite some flavour with the browning. I know there is no fat in it so I didn't really know how juicy it would be, but there is quite some intense taste; it's close to meat, it's not that juicy, but the consistency is perfect. This is meat to me... It's really something to bite on and I think the look is quite similar." Rützler added that even in a blind trial she would have taken the product for meat rather than a soya copy.

=== Industry development ===
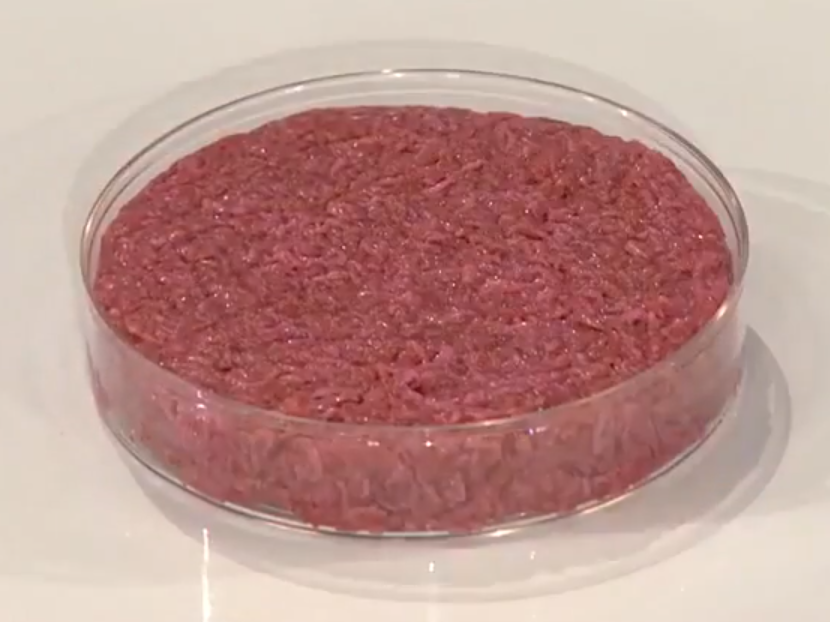
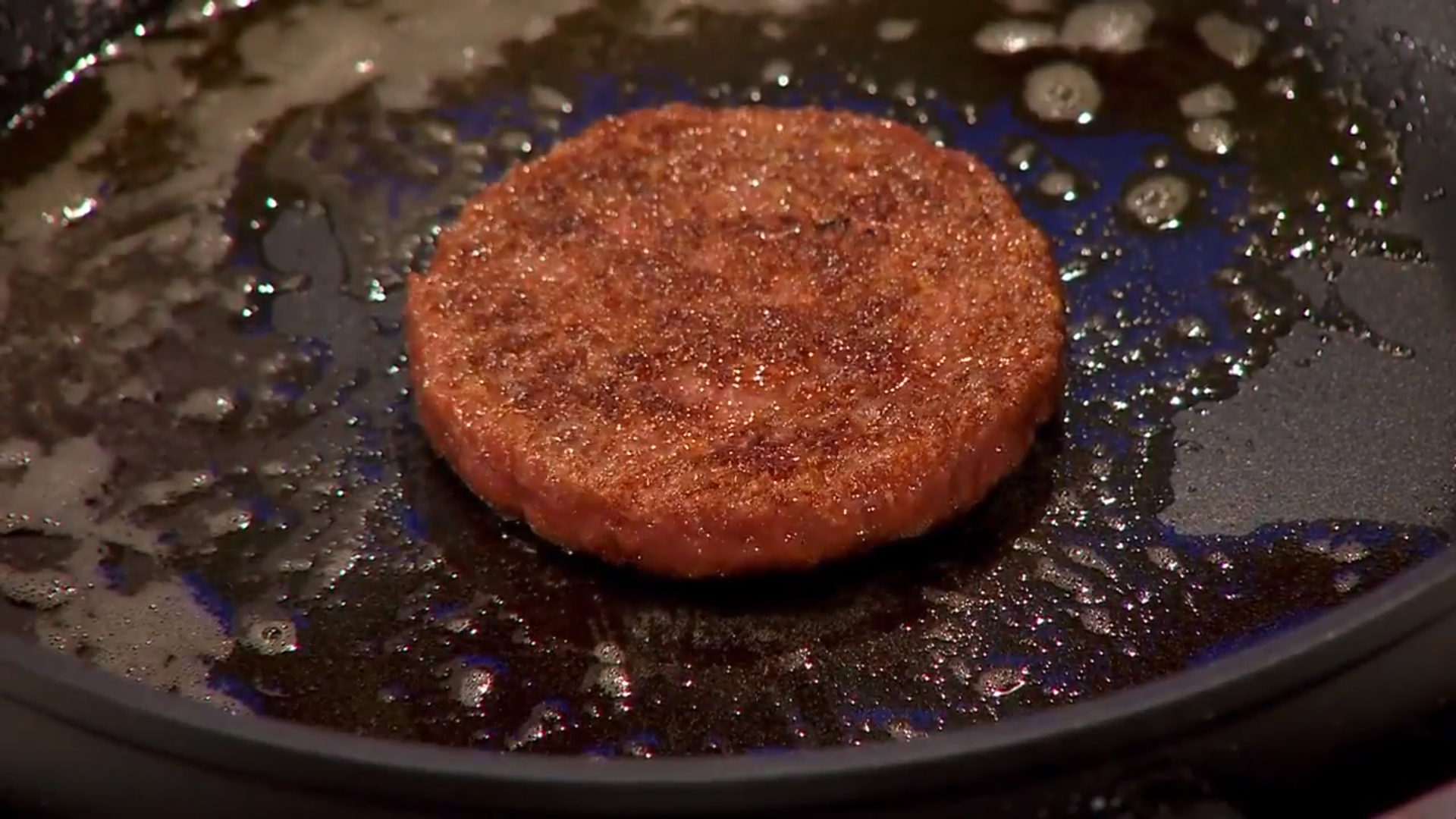
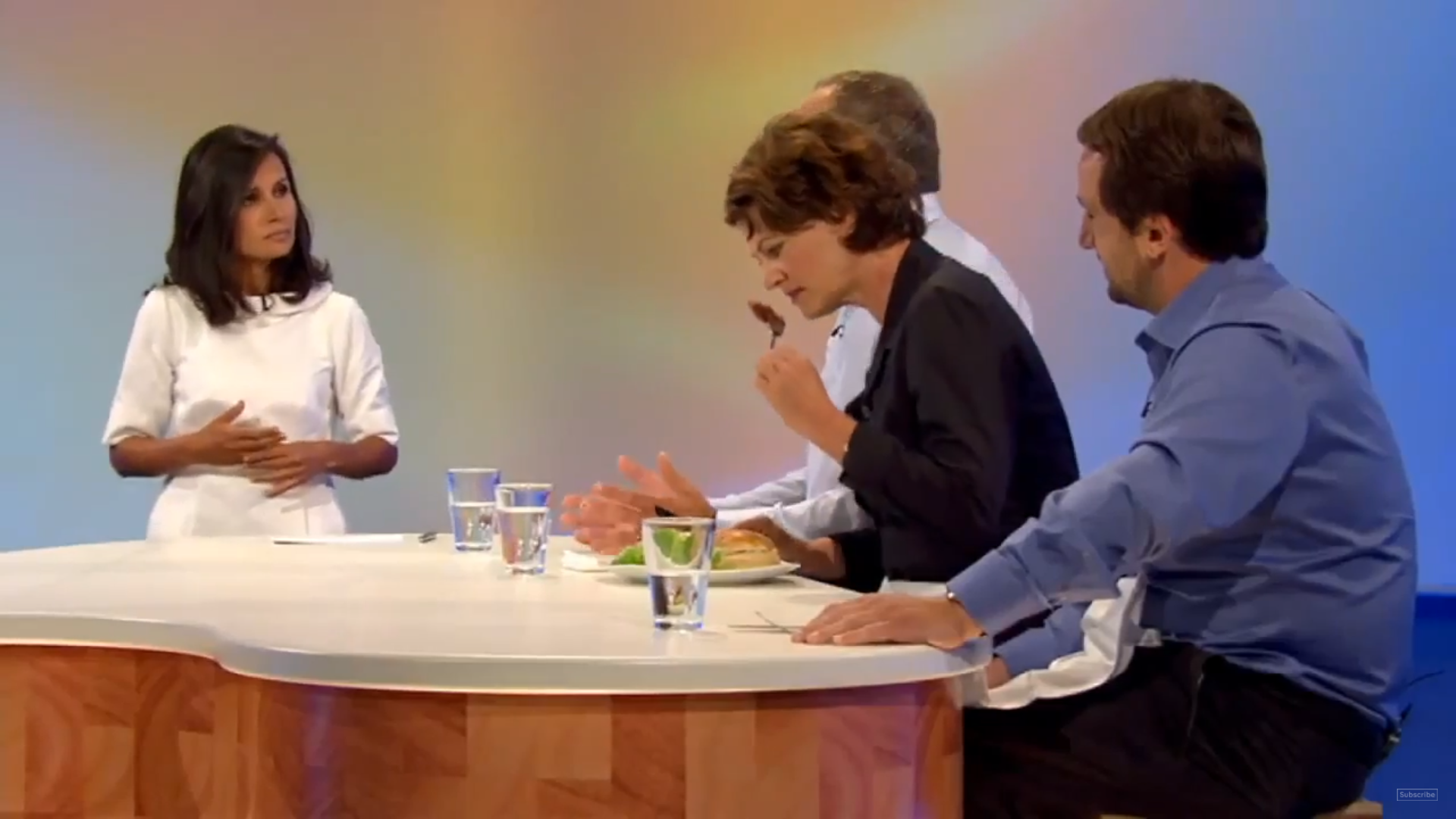
The first cultured hamburger: raw, fried, and tasted by Hanni Rützler on 5 August 2013

It's just a matter of time before this is gonna happen, I'm absolutely convinced of that. In our case, I estimate the time to be about 3 years before we are ready to enter the market on a small scale, about 5 years to enter the market on a larger scale, and if you'd ask me: "When will [cultured meat] be in the supermarket around the corner?" That'll be closer to 10 than to 5 years, I think.

— Peter Verstrate, Mosa Meat (2018)

Between 2011 and 2017, many cultured meat startups were launched. Memphis Meats, now known as Upside Foods, launched a video in February 2016, showcasing its cultured beef meatball. In March 2017, it showcased chicken tenders and duck a l'orange, the first cultured poultry shown to the public. An Israeli company, SuperMeat, cultured chicken. Finless Foods, a San Francisco-based company working on cultured fish, was founded in June 2016. In March 2017 it commenced laboratory operations.

In March 2018, Eat Just (in 2011 founded as Hampton Creek in San Francisco, later known as Just, Inc.) claimed to be able to offer a consumer product from cultured meat by the end of 2018. According to CEO Josh Tetrick the technology was already there. JUST had about 130 employees and a research department of 55 scientists, where cultured meat from poultry, pork and beef was researched. JUST has received investments from Chinese billionaire Li Ka-shing, Yahoo! co-founder Jerry Yang and according to Tetrick also by Heineken International and others.

Dutch startup Meatable, consisting of Krijn de Nood, Daan Luining, Ruud Out, Roger Pederson, Mark Kotter and Gordana Apic among others, reported in September 2018 that it had succeeded in growing meat using pluripotent stem cells from animal umbilical cords. Although such cells are reportedly difficult to work with, Meatable claimed to be able to direct them to behave to become muscle or fat cells as needed. The major advantage is that this technique bypasses fetal bovine serum, meaning that no animal has to be killed to produce meat. That month, an estimated 30 cultured meat startups operated across the world. IntegriCulture is a Japan-based company working on their CulNet system which is a platform that fosters innovation in cellular agriculture by using a feeder organ that works by naturally secreting growth factors that cell cultures need. Competitors included England based Multus Media and Canadian Future Fields.

In August 2019, five American startups announced the formation of the Alliance for Meat, Poultry & Seafood Innovation (AMPS Innovation), a coalition seeking to work with regulators to create a pathway to market for cultured meat and seafood. The founding members include Eat Just, Memphis Meats, Finless Foods, BlueNalu, and Fork & Goode. Similarly in December 2021, a group of 13 European and Israeli companies (Aleph Farms, Bluu Biosciences, Cubiq Foods, Future Meat, Gourmey, Higher Steaks, Ivy Farm, Meatable, Mirai Foods, Mosa Meat, Peace of Meat, SuperMeat, and Vital Meat) established Cellular Agriculture Europe, a Belgium-based association that sought to 'find common ground and speak with a shared voice for the good of the industry, consumers, and regulators'.

In October 2019, Aleph Farms collaborated with 3D Bioprinting Solutions to culture meat on the International Space Station. This was done by extruding meat cells onto a scaffold using a 3D printer. In January 2020, Quartz found around 30 cultured meat startups, and that Memphis Meats, Just Inc. and Future Meat Technologies were the most advanced because they were building pilot plants. According to New Scientist in May 2020, 60 start-ups were developing cultured meat. Some of these were technology suppliers. Growth media reportedly still cost "hundreds of dollars per litre, but for clean meat production to scale this needs to drop to around $1 a litre." In June 2020, Chinese government officials called for a national strategy to compete in cultured meat.

In December 2019, the Foieture project was launched in Belgium with the goal of developing cultured foie gras (the name is a portmanteau of 'foie' and 'future') by a consortium of 3 companies (cultured-meat startup Peace of Meat, small meat-seasoning company Solina, and small pâté-producing company Nauta) and 3 non-profit institutes (university KU Leuven, food industry innovation centre Flanders Food, and Bio Base Europe Pilot Plant). Peace of Meat stated in December 2019 that it intended to complete its proof of concept in 2020, to produce its first prototype in 2022, and to go to market in 2023. That month, the Foieture project received a research grant of almost 3.6 million euros from the Innovation and Enterprise Agency of the Flemish Government. In May 2020, Peace of Meat's Austrian-born cofounder and scientific researcher Eva Sommer stated that the startup was then able to produce 20 grams of cultured fat at a cost of about 300 euros (€15,000/kg); the goal was to reduce the price to 6 euros per kilogram by 2030. Piece of Meat built two laboratories in the Port of Antwerp. In late 2020, MeaTech acquired Peace of Meat for 15 million euros, and announced in May 2021 that it would build a new large-scale pilot plant in Antwerp by 2022.

In November 2020, Indian start-up Clear Meat claimed it had managed to cultivate chicken mince at the cost of only 800–850 Indian rupees (US$10.77–11.44), while a slaughtered processed chicken cost about 1,000 rupees. On 27 April 2022, the European Commission approved the request for the collection of signatures for the European Citizens' Initiative End The Slaughter Age to shift subsidies from animal husbandry to cellular agriculture.

According to a November 2023 report by Oghma Partners, 46.9% of all funds – over 2.6 billion British pounds – raised for cultivated meat start-ups between 2016 and 2023 went to a top five, comprising Upside Foods (21.5%; formerly Memphis Meats), Believer Meats (formerly Future Meat Technologies), Wildtype, Aleph Farms, and Mosa Meat.

=== Market entry ===
There is a handful [of startups]. It's quite interesting to see, there are three hubs: one in Silicon Valley, one in the Netherlands and one in Israel. I think that's because these three places have firstly, a great agricultural university – we've got Wageningen; secondly, a great medical university – for us that's Leiden; and finally we've got Delft on the engineering side. Those three combined gives you a firm basis to [develop cultured meat], and that [combination] exists in Israel, the Netherlands and America.

— Krijn de Nood, Meatable (2020)

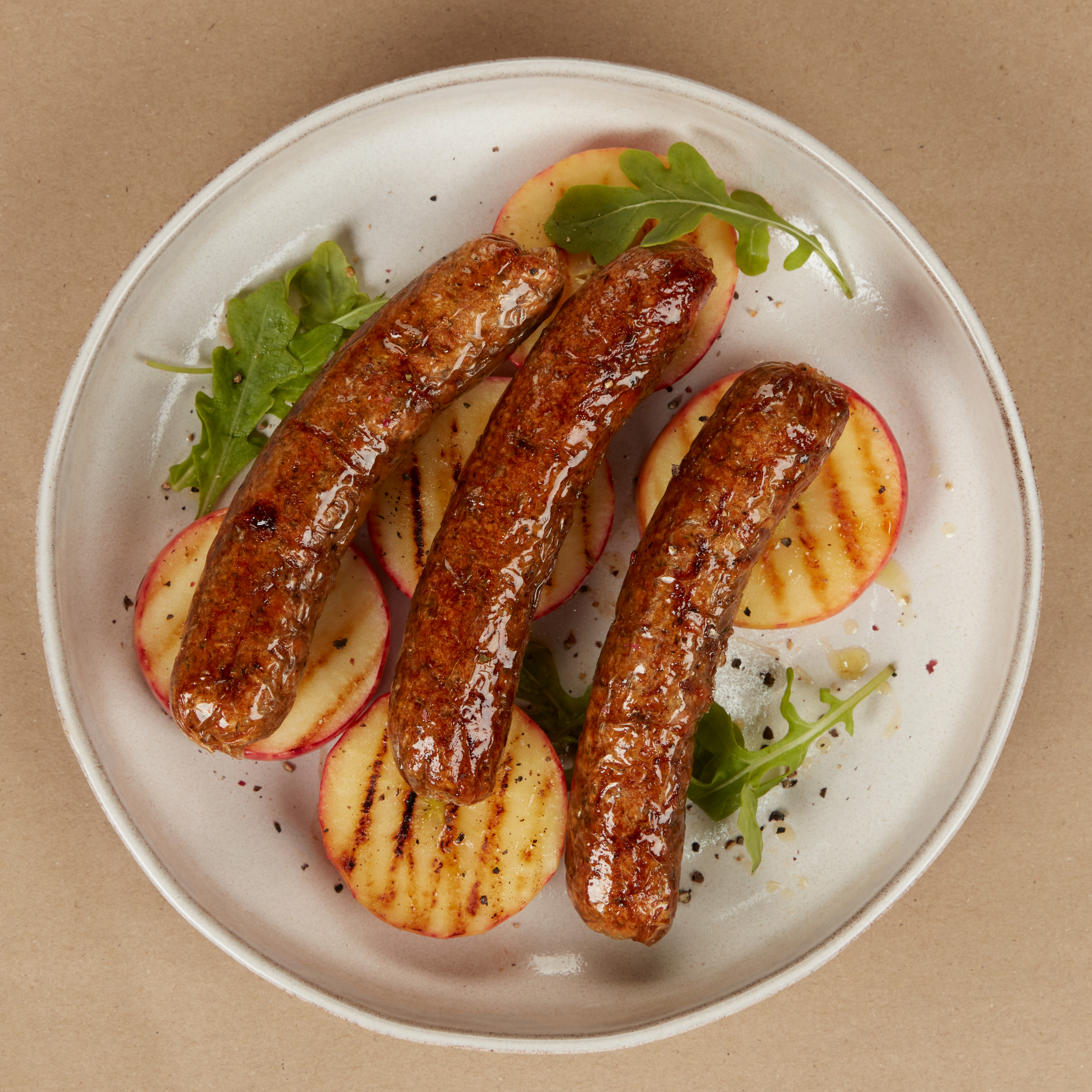
Cultivated sausages from Ivy Farm, 2023

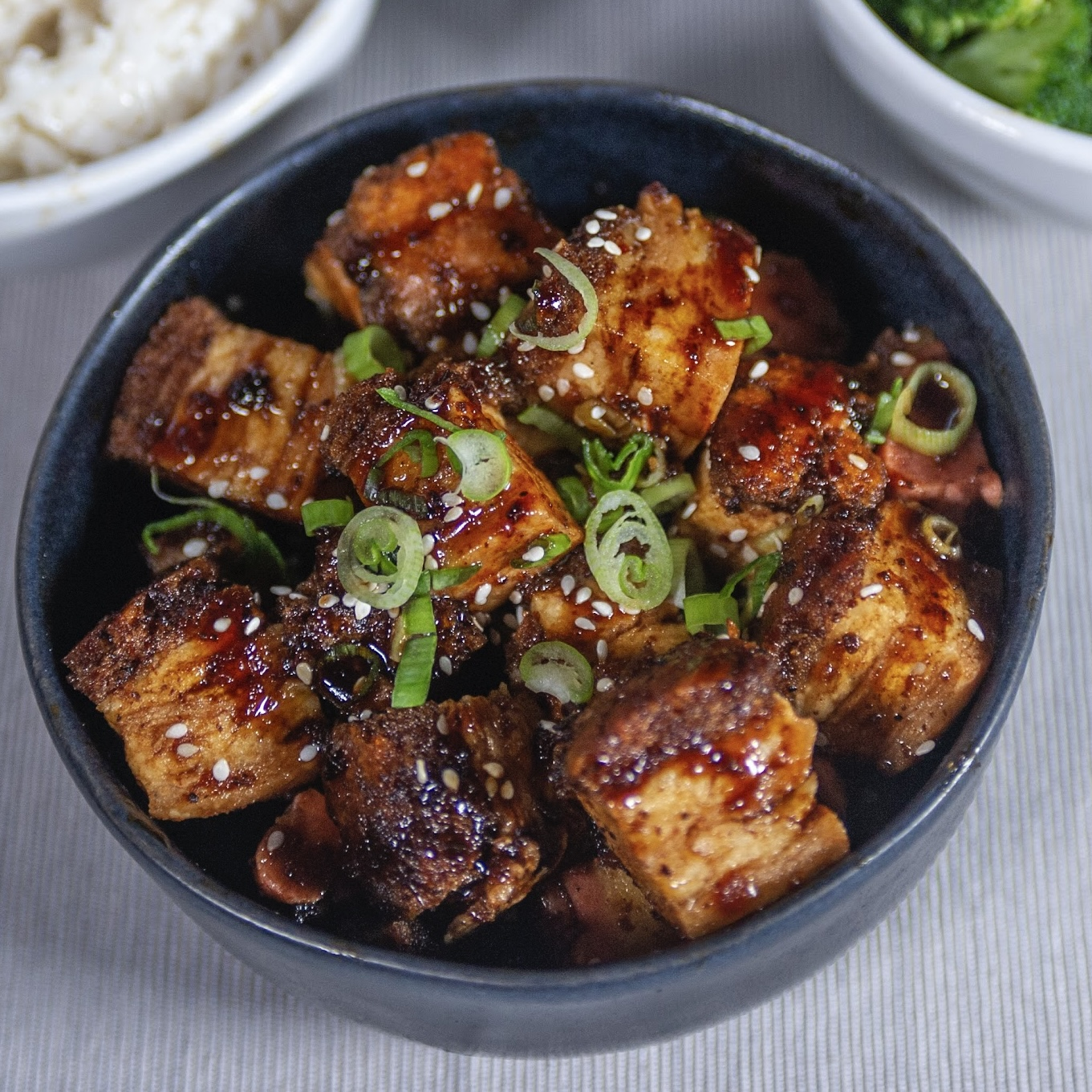
Cultivated pork belly from Uncommon, 2020

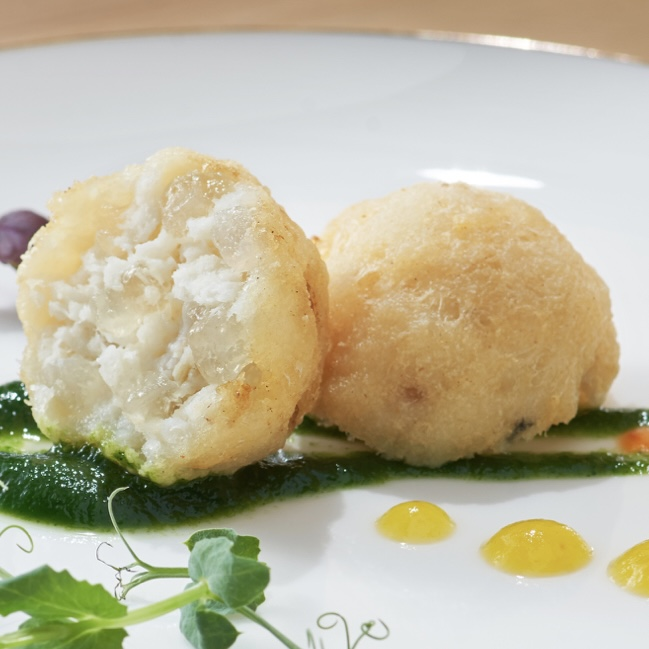
Cultivated fish maw from Avant, 2019

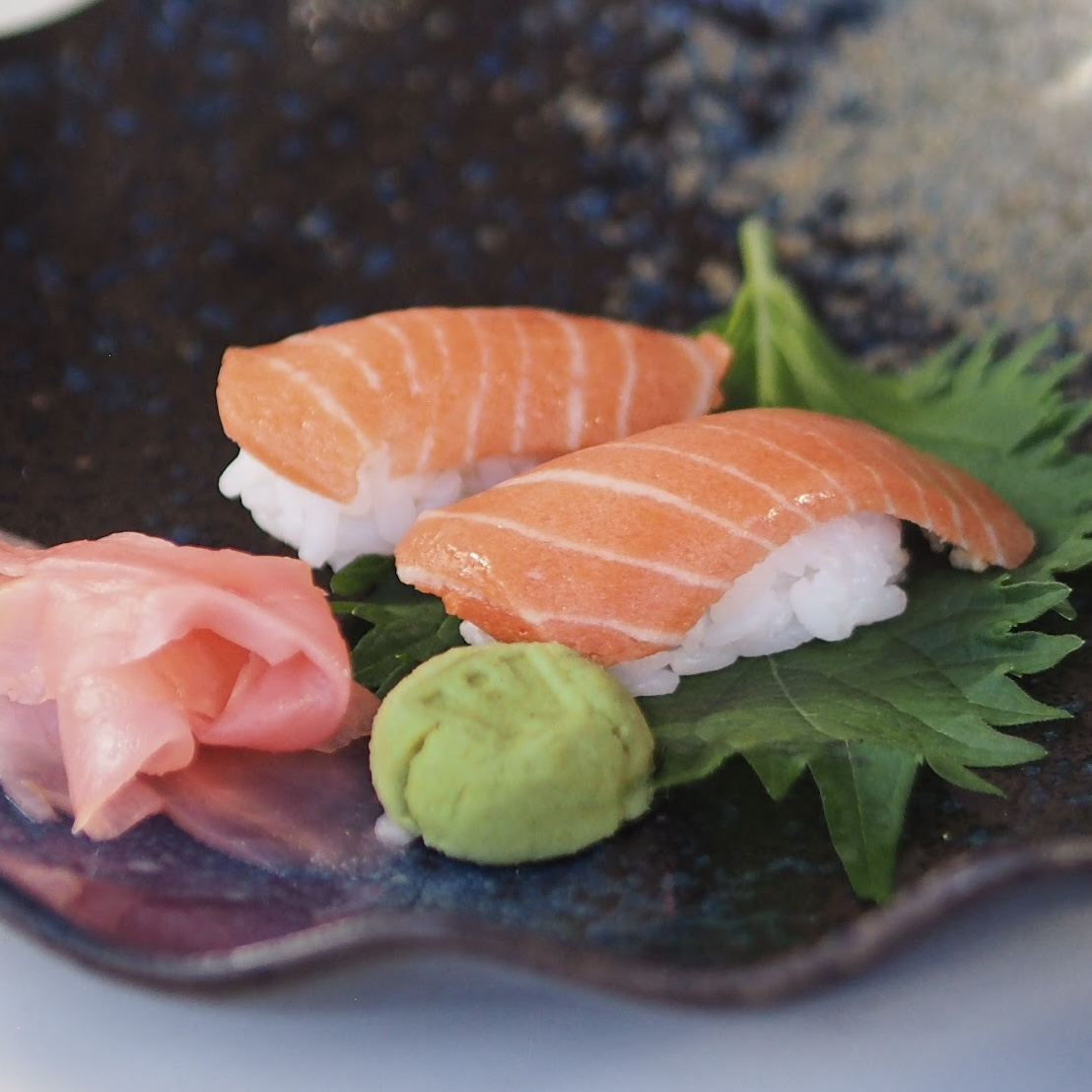
Cultivated salmon from Wildtype, 2020

==== Australia and New Zealand entry ====
On 7 April 2025, Vow quail became the first cultured meat product to be officially approved for sale in Australia and New Zealand. In mid-June 2025, Vow expected to be serving its cultivated quail in restaurants in Sydney and Melbourne "within weeks". The approval decision was issued by Food Standards Australia New Zealand (FSANZ) and marked the first-ever regulatory approval of a cultivated meat product, following a multi-year food safety assessment. In addition, the FSANZ introduced category-wide regulatory requirements and guidance for cultivated meat producers, extending beyond the assessment of Vow's individual product.

==== European Union and Switzerland entry ====
In the European Union, novel foods such as cultured meat products have to go through a testing period of about 18 months during which a company must prove to the European Food Safety Authority (EFSA) that their product is safe. In March 2022, cultured meat producers had reached the level of attempting to gain regulatory approval from European Union supranational institutions coming just before mass goods could be sold to consumers. By February 2023, none had yet submitted a novel food dossier for approval by the EFSA. Legal experts explained this as having to do with the fact that, although the EFSA's novel food procedure has been well-established since 1997 (unlike in other jurisdictions, that still have or had to develop certain regulatory standards), it is a long and complicated process in which companies can have little input once they have submitted their request, unlike cultured meat startups in the United States (who could easily communicate back and forth with the FDA to clarify any issues), and in the UK, Singapore and Israel (where governments have implemented a 'single point of contact' responsible for the overall process).

Aleph Farms was the first start-up to apply for approval of its cultivated beef steaks in Switzerland in July 2023. While not part of the European Union, Switzerland was regarded as an important case study with great interest from legal scholars around the world, and expected to have widespread implications for the EU countries surrounding it.

In April 2024, the Dutch start-up Meatable hosted the first legally approved public proof‑of‑concept tasting of cultured meat in the European Union - a sausage - following ad hoc approval by a national expert committee under a newly introduced Dutch code of practice. The event attracted significant national and international media attention. Meatable CTO Daan Luining cautioned it would take several years to scale up production to serve all supermarkets, that cultured meat was just an alternative that would gradually become more widely available, giving consumers more choices, and that the traditional meat industry would not be replaced any time soon.

In July 2024, French startup Gourmey was the first company in Europe to apply for regulatory approval at the EFSA, followed by pioneer Mark Post's Mosa Meat from the Netherlands in January 2025. Just two weeks later, after securing 1.5 million euros in a crowdfunding campaign within 24 minutes, Mosa Meat teamed up with Swiss meat processor Bell Food Group to apply for regulatory approval for its cultivated beef fat in Switzerland as well, and in May 2025 it submitted its application at the Food Standards Agency in the United Kingdom.

==== Israel entry ====
In November 2020, SuperMeat opened a test restaurant in Ness Ziona, Israel, right next to its pilot plant; journalists, experts and a small number of consumers could book an appointment to taste the novel food there, while looking through a glass window into the production facility on the other side. The restaurant was not yet fully open to the public, because as of June 2021 SuperMeat still needed to wait for regulatory approval to start mass production for public consumption, and because the COVID-19 pandemic restricted restaurant operations. By February 2023, Israeli authorities had established a regulatory structure similar to that of Singapore, and shown a general willingness to work towards approval (as well as financing research for cultivated food innovation), but were still in the process of developing safety regulations in consultations with researchers and other experts. For example, the Israeli Health Ministry and UN Food and Agriculture Organization (FAO) co-organised a convention of cultivated food safety regulation experts in September 2022.

In January 2024, the Ministry of Health in Israel granted regulatory approval for cultured beef to Aleph Farms.

==== Singapore entry ====
On 2 December 2020, the Singapore Food Agency approved the "chicken bites" produced by Eat Just for commercial sale. It marked the first time that a cultured meat product passed the safety review (which took 2 years) of a food regulator, and was widely regarded as a milestone for the industry. The chicken bits were scheduled for introduction in Singaporean restaurants. Restaurant "1880" became the first to serve cultured meat to customers on Saturday 19 December 2020.

In January 2023, the SFA also granted regulatory approval for the production of cultured meat with serum-free media to Eat Just subsidiary GOOD Meat, which had introduced its cultivated chicken product in several more Singaporean restaurants as well as hawker centres and food delivery services since 2020, and was constructing the bioreactors for its new facility in Singapore. This world-first approval was said to be a milestone in making cultivated meat production more scalable and efficient. In April 2024, Australian start-up Vow obtained Singaporean approval for its cultured quail; while Dutch start-up Meatable would be introducing its cultivated pork sausages in several restaurants in Singapore later in 2024.

==== United States entry ====
In November 2022, the Food and Drug Administration (FDA) completed the pre-market consultation of Upside Foods (formerly Memphis Meats), concluding that its products were safe to eat, a first for cultivated meat companies in the United States. Approval from the final agency, the United States Department of Agriculture (USDA) was received by Upside Foods and Good Meat, both for cultivated chicken, in June 2023. On 28 May 2025, Wildtype obtained regulatory approval from the FDA to sell its cultivated coho salmon (Oncorhynchus kisutch) product on the U.S. market. With that, Wildtype became the first start-up to be permitted to sell cultivated seafood in the United States, and a few days later, it was on the menu at the Kann restaurant of Gregory Gourdet in Portland, Oregon.

==== United Kingdom entry ====
On 6 February 2025, it was announced that British pet food company THE PACK (acquired by Prefera Petfood in May 2025) would release the first commercially available product for pets containing cultivated chicken made by Meatly the following day.

== Process ==
A five-step diagram of cultured meat's production process

=== Cell lines ===
Cellular agriculture requires cell lines, generally stem cells. Stem cells are undifferentiated cells which have the potential to become many or all of the required kinds of specialized cell types. Totipotent stem cells have the capacity to differentiate into all the different cell types found within the body. Pluripotent stem cells can mature into all cell types save those in the placenta, and multipotent stem cells can differentiate into several specialized cell types within one lineage. Unipotent stem cells can differentiate into one specific cell fate.

Stem cells can differentiate into a range of specialized cells.

While pluripotent stem cells would be an ideal source, the most prominent example of this subcategory is embryonic stem cells which—due to ethical issues—are controversial for use in research. As a result, scientists have developed induced pluripotent stem cells (iPSCs)—essentially multipotent blood and skin cells that have been regressed to a pluripotent state enabling them to differentiate into a greater range of cells. The alternative is using multipotent adult stem cells that give rise to muscle cell lineages or unipotent progenitors which differentiate into muscle cells.

Favourable characteristics of stem cells include immortality, proliferative ability, unreliance on adherence, serum independence and easy differentiation into tissue. The natural presence of such characteristics are likely to differ across cell species and origin. As such, in vitro cultivation must be adjusted to fill the exact needs of a specific cell line. The immortality issue is that cells have a limit on the number of times they can divide that is dictated by their telomere cap—supplementary nucleotide bases added to the end of their chromosomes. With each division, the telomere cap progressively shortens until nothing remains, at which time the cells cease to divide. Induced pluripotency can lengthen telomere cap such that the cells divide indefinitely.

Cell lines can be collected from a primary source, i.e., through a biopsy on an animal under local anesthesia. They could also be established from secondary sources such as cryopreserved cultures (cultures frozen after previous research).

=== Growth medium ===
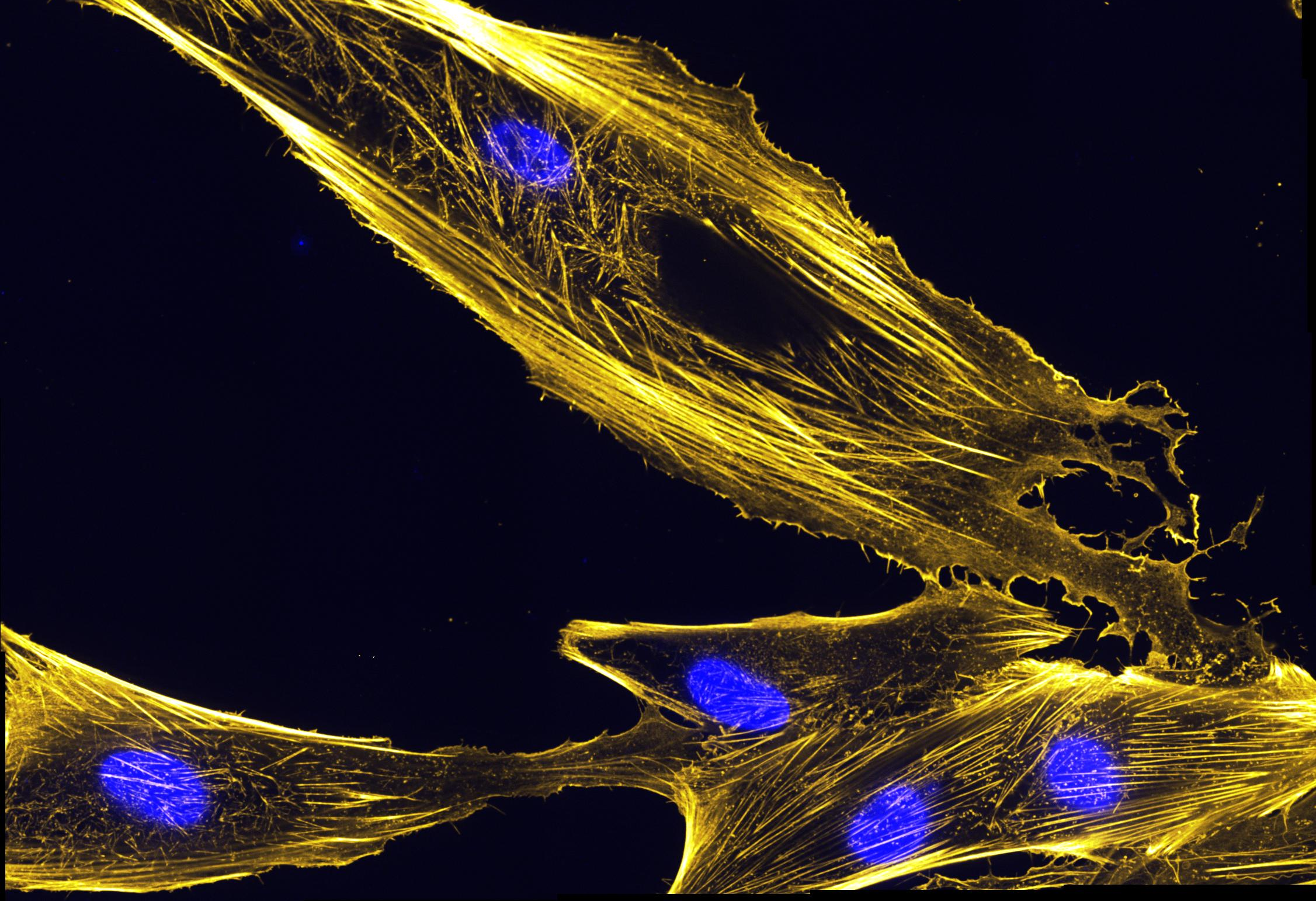
Myoblasts are one precursor to muscle cells. Their fibers here are shown in yellow and their nuclei in blue.

Once cell lines are established, they are immersed in a culture medium to induce them to proliferate. Culture media are typically formulated from basal media that provide cells with necessary carbohydrates, fats, proteins and salts. Once a cell consumes a sufficient amount, it divides and the population increases exponentially. Culture media can be supplemented with additives—for instance sera—that supply additional growth factors. Growth factors can be secreted proteins or steroids that are crucial in regulating cellular processes.

Once differentiation begins, muscle fibres begin to contract and generate lactic acid. Cells' ability to absorb nutrients and proliferate in part depends on the pH of their environment. As lactic acid accumulates within the medium, the environment will become progressively more acidic and falls below the optimal pH. As a result, culture media must be frequently refreshed. This helps refresh the concentration of nutrients from the basal media.

=== Scaffolds ===
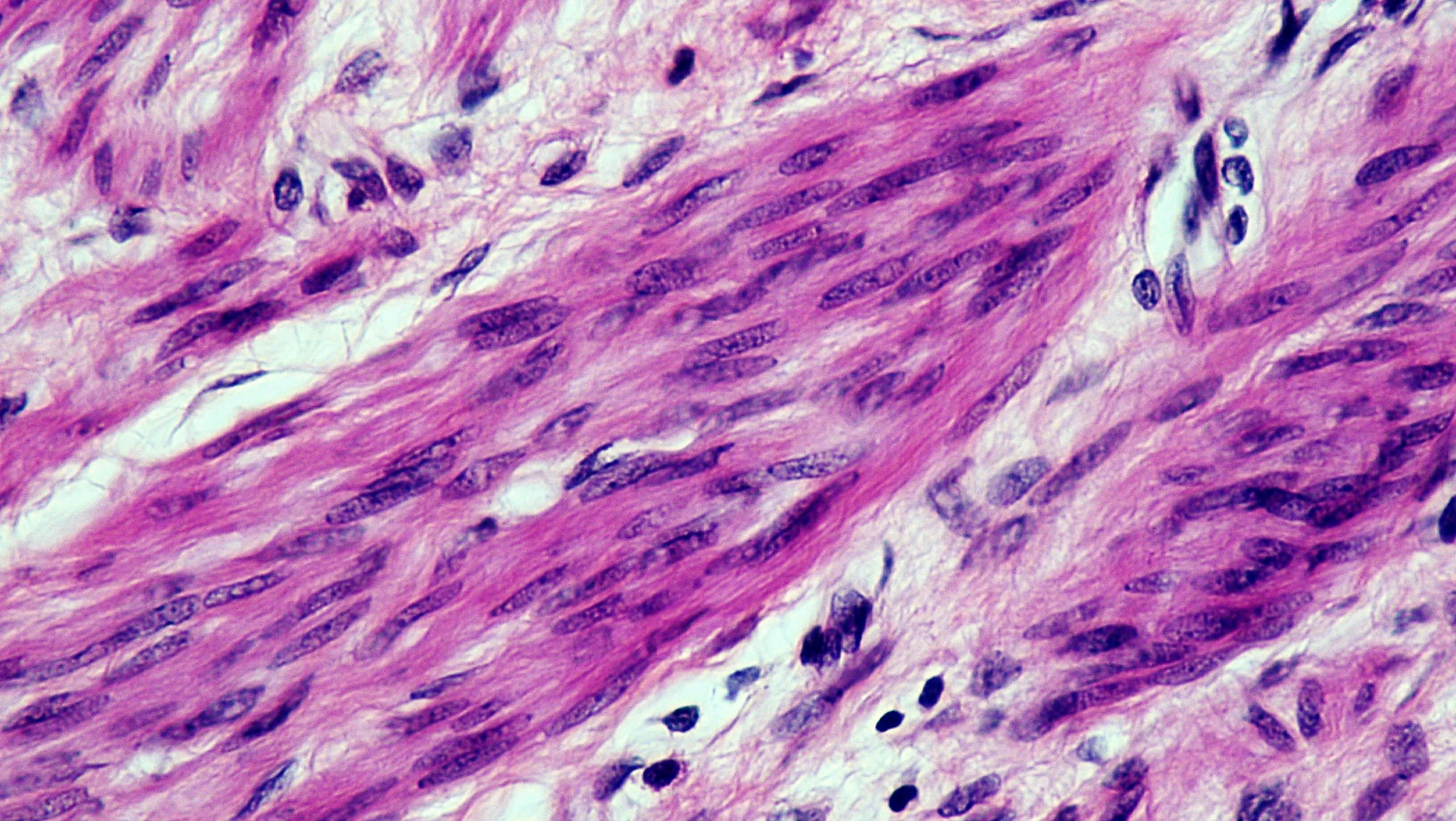
Muscle tissue is developed from the growth medium. The scaffold organizes in a three-dimensional structure for the end product.

In the case of structured meat products—products that are characterized by their overall configuration as well as cell type—cells must be seeded to scaffolds. Scaffolds are essentially molds meant to reflect and encourage the cells to organize into a larger structure. When cells develop in vivo, they are influenced by their interactions with the extracellular matrix (ECM). The ECM is the 3-dimensional mesh of glycoproteins, collagen and enzymes responsible for transmitting mechanical and biochemical cues to the cell. Scaffolds need to simulate the characteristics of the ECM.

==== Porosity ====
Pores are minute openings on the surface of the scaffold. They can be created on the surface of the biomaterial in order to release cellular components that could interfere with tissue development. They also help diffuse gas and nutrients to the innermost layers of adherent cells, preventing a "necrotic center" from forming. A necrotic center is a phenomenon in which cells that are not in direct contact with the culture medium die from a lack of nutrients.

==== Vascularization ====
Vascular tissue found in plants contains the organs responsible for internally transporting fluids. It forms natural topographies that provide a low cost way to promote cell alignment by replicating the natural physiological state of myoblasts. It may also help with gas and nutrient exchange.

==== Biochemical properties ====
A scaffold's biochemical properties should be similar to those of the ECM. It must facilitate cell adhesion through textural qualities or chemical bonding. Additionally, it must produce the chemical cues that encourage cell differentiation. Alternatively, the material should be able to blend with other substances which have these functional qualities.

==== Crystallinity ====
The degree of a material's crystallinity determines qualities such as rigidity. High crystallinity can be attributed to hydrogen bonding which in turn increases thermal stability, tensile strength (important for maintaining the scaffold's shape), water retention (important for hydrating the cells) and Young's modulus.

==== Degradation ====
Certain materials degrade into compounds that are beneficial to cells, although this degradation can also be irrelevant or detrimental. Degradation allows easy removal of the scaffold from the finished product leaving only animal tissue—thereby increasing its resemblance to in vivo meat. This degradation can be induced by exposure to certain enzymes which do not impact the muscle tissue.

==== Edibility ====
If scaffolds are unable to be removed from the animal tissue, they must be edible to ensure consumer safety. It would be beneficial if they were to be made out of nutritious ingredients. Since 2010, academic research groups and companies have been working to identify raw materials that have the characteristics of suitable scaffolds.

==== Cellulose ====
Cellulose is the most abundant polymer in nature and provides the exoskeletons of plant leaves. Due to its abundance, it can be obtained at a relatively low cost. It is also versatile and biocompatible. Through a process called "decellularization", it is coated in a surfactant that creates pores. These pores release the plant's cellular components, and it becomes decellularized plant tissue. This material has been extensively studied by the Pelling and Gaudette Groups at University of Ottawa and Worcester Polytechnic Institute, respectively. Through cross-linking (forming covalent bonds between individual polymer chains to hold them together) the plant tissue's mechanical properties can be changed so that it more closely resembles muscle tissue. This can also be done by blending plant tissue with other materials. On the other hand, decellularized plant tissue typically lacks mammalian biochemical cues, so it needs to be coated with compensatory functional proteins. C2C12 growth was not shown to change significantly between the bare scaffold and the same scaffold with a coating of collagen or gelatin proteins; however, seeding efficiency (rate at which cells attach to the scaffold) improved.

An advantage of decellularized plant tissue is the natural topography afforded by the leaf vasculature. This helps replicate the natural physiological state of the myoblasts which promotes cell alignment. The other ways of doing this are usually quite a bit more expensive including 3D printing, soft lithography and photolithography. Vascularization can also help overcome the 100–200 nm diffusion limit of culture medium into cells that usually produce necrotic centres in muscle conglomerates. Another way to do this is by having a porous scaffold which supports angiogenesis (the development of new blood vessels). While this has been shown to work for apple Hypanthium, not all plants are nearly as porous. The alternative to plant cellulose is bacterial cellulose which is typically more pure than plant cellulose as it is free from contaminants such as lignin and hemicellulose. Bacterial cellulose has more hydrogen bonding between its polymer strands and so it has greater crystallinity. It also has smaller microfibrils that allow it to retain more moisture and have smaller pores. The substance can be produced using waste carbohydrates (which may allow it to be produced less expensively) and it adds juiciness and chewiness to emulsified meat (which would mean that even if it can't be taken out of the final product, it will contribute to the texture profile).

Decellularized plants that have been studied as possible scaffold materials include spinach, bamboo, algae, apple, celery, and Aloe vera.

==== Chitin ====
Chitin is nature's second most abundant polymer. It is found in the exoskeletons of arthropods and fungi. As cellular agriculture is attempting to end reliance on animals, chitin derived from fungi is of greater interest. It has mostly been studied by Pelling Group. Chitosan is derived from chitin in a process known as alkaline deacetylation (substituting out certain amino acid groups). The degree of this process determines the physical and chemical properties of the chitosan. Chitosan has antibacterial properties; in particular, it has bactericidal effects on planktonic bacteria and biofilms and a bacteria static effects on gram negative bacteria such as E. coli. This is important as it neutralizes potentially harmful compounds without using antibiotics, which many consumers avoid. Chitosan's resemblance to glycosaminoglycans and internal interactions between glycoproteins and proteoglycans make it highly biocompatible. It can easily blend with other polymers in order to select for more bioactive factors. One potential disadvantage of chitosan is that it degrades in the presence of lysozymes (naturally occurring enzymes). But, this can be resisted using deacetylation. This is not entirely negative, as the byproducts produced through degradation have anti-inflammatory and anti-bacterial properties. It is important to match the level that cells rely on the matrix for structure with degradation.

==== Collagen ====
Collagen is a family of proteins that makes up the primary structure of human connective tissue. It is typically derived from bovine, porcine and murine sources. Cellular agriculture overcomes this dependency through the use of transgenic organisms that are capable of producing the amino acid repeats that make up the collagen. Collagen naturally exists as collagen type I. It has been produced as porous hydrogels, composites and substrates with topographical cues and biochemical properties. Synthetic kinds of collagen have been produced through recombinant protein production—collagen type II and III, tropoelastin and fibronectin. One challenge with these proteins is that they can not be modified post translation. However, an alternative fibrillar protein has been isolated in microbes that lack collagen's biochemical cues, but has its kind of gene customizability. One focus of recombinant collagen production is yield optimization—how it can be produced most effectively. Plants, in particular, tobacco look like the best option, however, bacteria and yeast are also viable alternatives.

Textured soy protein is a soy flour product often used in plant-based meat that supports the growth of bovine cells. Its spongy texture enables efficient cell seeding and its porosity encourages oxygen transfer. Additionally, it degrades during cell differentiation into compounds that are beneficial to certain cells.

==== Mycelium ====
Mycelium are the roots of mushrooms. Altast Foods Co. is using solid state fermentation to grow mushroom tissue on mycelium scaffolds. They harvest this tissue and use it to create bacon analogs.

==== Nanomaterials ====
Nanomaterials exhibit unique properties at the nanoscale. London-based Biomimetic Solutions is leveraging nanomaterials in order to create scaffolds. Cass Materials in Perth, Australia, is using a dietary fibre called Nata de Coco (derived from coconuts) to create nanocellulose sponges for their BNC scaffold. Nata de Coco is biocompatible, has high porosity, facilitates cell adhesion and is biodegradable.

==== Spinning ====
Immersion Jet Spinning is a method of creating scaffolds by spinning polymers into fibres. It was developed by the Parker Group at Harvard. Their platform uses centrifugal force to extrude a polymer solution through an opening in a rotating reservoir. During extrusion, the solution forms a jet that elongates and aligns as it crosses the air gap. The jet is directed into a vortex-controlled precipitation bath that chemically cross links or precipitates polymer nanofibers. Adjusting air gap, rotation and the solution changes the diameter of the resulting fibres. This method can spin scaffolds out of PPTA, nylon, DNA and nanofiber sheets. A nanofibrous scaffold made from alginate and gelatin was able to support the growth of C2C12 cells. Rabbit and bovine aortic smooth muscle myoblasts were able to adhere to the gelatin fibres. They formed aggregates on shorter fibres, and aligned tissue on the longer ones. Matrix Meats is using electrospinning—a process that uses electric force to turn charged polymers into fibres for scaffolds. Their scaffolds allowed meat marbling, are compatible with multiple cell lines, and are scalable.

=== Additive manufacturing ===
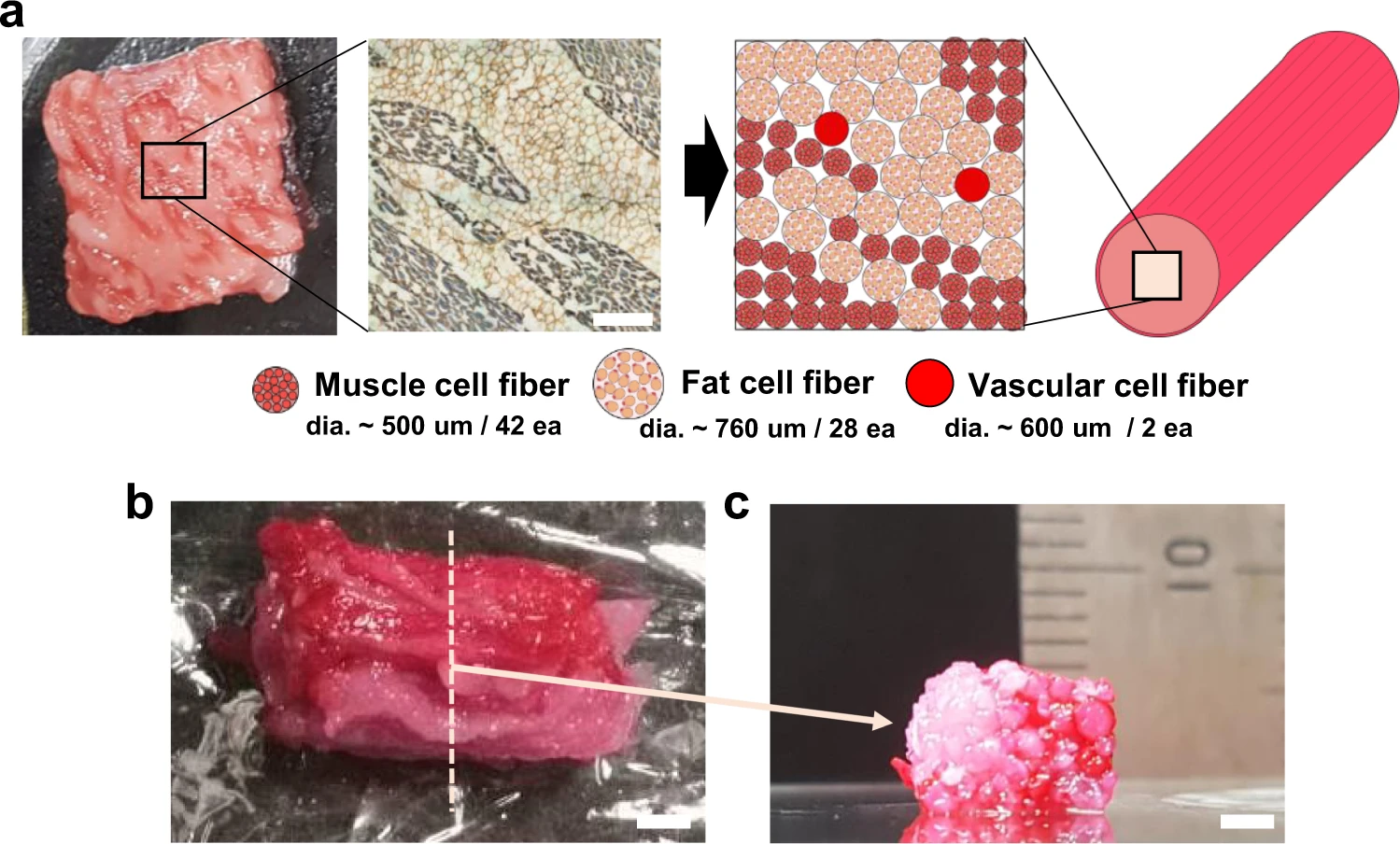
Bioprinting that assembles cell fibers could be used to produce a variety of steak-like cultured meat.

Another proposed way of structuring muscle tissue is additive manufacturing. Such a technique was perfected for industrial applications in manufacturing objects made out of plastic, metal, glass and other synthetic materials. The most common variation of the process involves incrementally depositing a filament in layers onto a bed until the object is completed. This method will most likely lend itself best to the application of cultured meat as opposed to other types such as binder jetting, material jetting or stereolithography that require a specific kind of resin or powder.

A filament of muscle cells can be printed into a structure meant to resemble a finished meat product which can then be further processed for cell maturation. This technique has been demonstrated in a collaboration between 3D bioprinting solutions and Aleph Farms that used additive manufacturing to structure turkey cells on the International Space Station. 3D bioprinting has been used to produce steak-like cultured meat, composed of three types of bovine cell fibers and with a structure of assembled of cell fibers that is similar to original meat.

=== Bioreactors ===
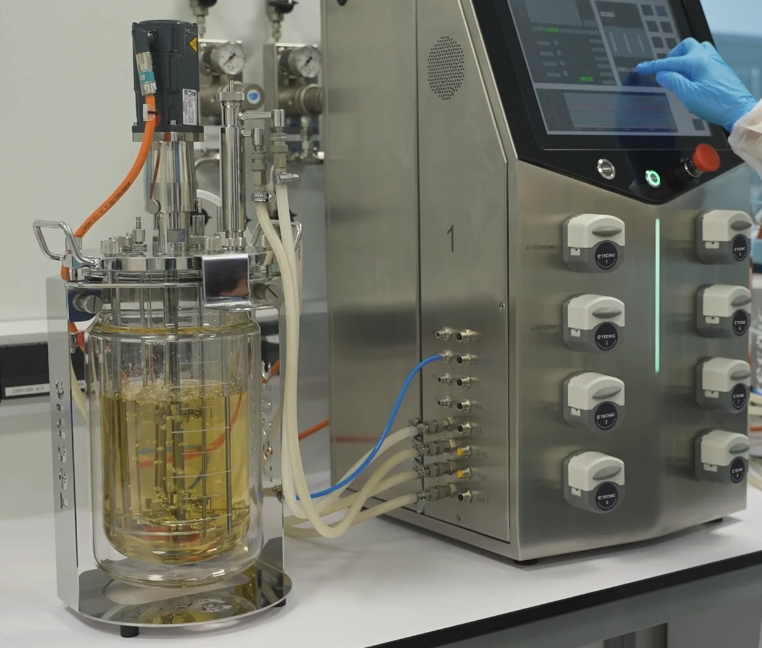
A small scale laboratory bioreactor

A potential bioreactor configuration for cultured meat

Scaffolds are placed inside bioreactors so that cell growth and specialization can occur. Bioreactors are large machines similar to brewery tanks which expose the cells to a large variety of environmental factors that are necessary to promote either proliferation or differentiation. The temperature of the bioreactor must replicate in vivo conditions. In the case of mammalian cells, this requires heating to 37 °C (99 °F). Alternatively, insect cells can be grown at room temperature. Most bioreactors are maintained at 5% carbon dioxide. Cells can be cultivated in either continuous or fed-batch systems. The former entails inoculating and harvesting cells in a constant process so that there are always cells in the bioreactor. Fed-batch systems mean inoculating the cells, culturing them and harvesting them in a single period.

Stirred tank bioreactors are the most widely used configuration. An impeller increases the flow, thereby homogenizing the culture media and a diffuser facilitates the exchange of oxygen into the media. This system is generally used for suspended cultures but can be used for cells that require attachment to another surface if microcarriers are included. Fixed bed bioreactors are commonly used for adherent cultures. They feature strips of fibres that are packed together to form a bed to which cells can attach. Aerated culture media is circulated through the bed. In airlift bioreactors, the culture media is aerated into a gaseous form using air bubbles which are then scattered and dispersed amongst the cells. Perfusion bioreactors are common configurations for continuous cultivation. They continuously drain media saturated with lactic acid that is void of nutrients and fill it with replenished media.

== Challenges ==
=== Growth factors ===
The culture media is an essential component of in vitro cultivation. It is responsible for providing the macromolecules, nutrients and growth factors necessary for cell proliferation. Sourcing growth factors is one of the most challenging tasks of cellular agriculture. Traditionally, it involves the use of fetal bovine serum (FBS) which is a blood product extracted from fetal cows. Besides the argument that its production is unethical, it also violates the notion that the cultured meat is produced independent of the use of animals. It is also the most costly constituent of cultured meat, priced at around $1000 per litre. Furthermore, chemical composition varies greatly depending on the animal, so it cannot be uniformly quantified chemically. FBS is employed because it conveniently mimics the process of muscle development in vivo. The growth factors needed for tissue development are predominantly provided through an animal's bloodstream, and no other known fluid can single-handedly deliver all these components.

The current alternative is to generate each growth factor individually using recombinant protein production. In this process, the genes coding for the specific factor are integrated into bacteria which are then fermented. Due to the added complexity of this process, it is particularly expensive. Future Fields, a Canadian company focused on overcoming the economic and environmental costs of traditional growth media, is developing serum-free growth factors from fruit flies.

The ideal medium would be chemically quantifiable and accessible to ensure simplicity in production, cheap and not dependent on animals. It has been proposed that deriving from plants would be ideal; and while this may reduce the possibility of transmitting infectious agents, it may introduce a risk of allergic reactions. Such culture sera may also require modifications specific to the cell line to which they are applied. Companies currently invested in developing effective plant based culture include Multus Media and Biftek.

The Good Food Institute (GFI) put out a report in 2019 in support of the concept that cell-based meat could be produced at the same cost as ground beef and in 2021 they commissioned a report from CE Delft on the Techno-Economic Analysis of cultivated meat. Another proposed approach is to subject the cell lines to a magnetic field, which can stimulate the release of molecules that have regenerative, metabolic, anti-inflammatory and immunity-boosting properties, acting as an alternative to serum.

=== Surface area ===
A common challenge to bioreactors and scaffolds is developing system configurations that enable all cells to gain exposure to culture media while simultaneously optimizing spatial requirements. In the cell proliferation phase, prior to the introduction of the scaffold, many cell types need to be attached to a surface to support growth. As such, cells must be grown in confluent monolayers only one cell thick which necessitates a lot of surface area. This poses practical challenges on large scales. As such, systems may incorporate microcarriers—small spherical beads of glass or other compatible material that are suspended in the culture medium. Cells adhere to these microcarriers as they would to the sides of the bioreactor, which increases the amount of surface area.

In the cell differentiation phase, the cells may be seeded to a scaffold and so do not require the use of microcarriers. However, in these instances, the density of the cells on the scaffold means that not all cells have an interface with culture media, leading to cell death and necrotic centers within the meat. When muscle is cultivated in vivo, this issue is circumvented as the extracellular matrix delivers nutrients into the muscle through blood vessels. As such, many emerging scaffolds aim to replicate such networks.

Similarly, scaffolds must simulate many of the other characteristics of the extracellular matrix, most notably porosity, crystallinity, degradation, biocompatibility and functionality. Few materials that emulate all these characteristics have been identified, leading to the possibility of blending different materials with complementary properties.

=== Research support ===
Cellular agriculture research does not have a significant basis of academic interest or funding streams. Consequently, the majority of research has been undertaken and funded by independent institutions. This is incrementally changing as not-for-profits drive support and interest. Notably, New Harvest has a fellowship program to support graduate students and groups at various academic institutions. Additionally, a growing number of governments are funding research in cellular agriculture. In August 2020, the Grant Management Services of the European Commission awarded a €2.5 million grant to ORF Genetics. That same month, the Japanese Ministry of Economy, Trade and Industry granted IntegriCulture $2.2 million through their New Energy and Industrial Technology Development Organization.

The European Union's Horizon 2020 R&D funding framework awarded a €2.7 million grant to a consortium led by BioTech Foods. In 2021, the Spanish government granted €3.7 million for Biotech Foods to investigate the potential health benefits of cellular agriculture. The National Science Foundation awarded a $3.55 million grant to a team of researchers at UC Davis for open-access cultured meat research. Non-profits also drive support and interest in the field. Notably, New Harvest has a fellowship program to support the research of specific graduate students and groups at various academic institutions and the Good Food Institute funds open-access research through its Research Grant Program.

=== Consumer acceptance ===
Consumer acceptance of the product is critical. A study looking at acceptance of cultured meat in China, India, and the US "found high levels of acceptance of clean meat in the three most populous countries worldwide." Several potential factors of consumer acceptance of cultured meat have been identified. Healthiness, safety, nutritional characteristics, sustainability, taste, and lower price, are all contributing factors. One study found that the use of highly technical language to explain cultured meat led to significantly more negative public attitude towards the concept. One study suggested that describing cultured meat in a way that emphasizes the final product rather than the production method was an effective way to improve acceptance.

The use of standardized descriptions would improve future research about consumer acceptance of cultured meat. Current studies have often reported drastically different rates of acceptance, despite similar survey populations. Lou Cooperhouse, CEO of BlueNalu, shared on the Red to Green Podcast that "cell-based" and "cell-cultured" were suitable terms to differentiate it from conventional meat whilst being clear about the process by which it was made. There also exists a challenge in how to use these descriptions in labelling. For example, in the United States there is no overarching federal legislation that regulates how cultured meat should be labeled for the consumer. While traditional meat producers are attempting to prevent cultured meat companies from using the term "meat," cultured meat producers argue that the word is necessary for consumer acceptance.

Global market acceptance has not been assessed. Studies are attempting to determine the current levels of consumer acceptance and identify methods to improve this value. Clear answers are not available, although one recent study reported that consumers were willing to pay a premium for cultured meat. Low percentages of older adult populations have been reported to show acceptance of cultured meat. Green eating behavior, educational status, and food business were cited as most important factors for this population. There is also a lack of studies relating the methods of producing cultured meat with its taste for the consuming public.

=== Regulations ===
Regulatory matters must also be sorted out. Prior to being available for sale, the European Union, Australia, New Zealand, the United Kingdom, and Canada require approved novel food applications. Additionally, the European Union requires that cultured animal products and production must prove safety, by an approved company application, as of 1 January 2018.

==== Japan ====
In June 2026, Japan published the first draft of its safety guidelines for cultivated meat, following discussions led by the Ministry of Health, Labor and Welfare and the Consumer Affairs Agency. The draft establishes safety assessment criteria covering cell sourcing, manufacturing processes, quality control, allergens, nutritional composition and final product specifications. The guidelines remain under discussion as Japan works towards its first formal regulatory framework for cultivated food.

==== Singapore ====
In 2020, Singapore became the first country in the world to approve cultured meat for sale. The Singapore Food Agency has published guidance on its requirements for the safety assessment of novel foods, including specific requirements on the information to be submitted for approval of cultivated meat products.

==== Italy ====
In March 2023, Italy's Meloni government approved a draft bill banning the production and commercialization of cultivated meat for human and animal consumption; this move, which the government said was intended to protect food heritage, was criticized, including by scientists, for being at odds with global trends of openness and legalization, as misguided, and for possibly worsening climate change in Italy.

By October 2023, it was reported the Italian government had retired the draft bill, and withdrew the Technical Regulation Information System notification, a procedure aimed at preventing the creation of barriers within the European Union's internal market, for the bill. Francesco Lollobrigida, Italy's minister of agriculture, said that the withdrawal of the proposed anti-cultured meat bill Italy submitted to the European Union "is not a step back", which many speculated was because the government wanted to avoid a likely rejection by the European Commission. He added that the bill was not going to be retired and would move forward. Italy became the first country to ban cultured meat in November 2023, when the government approved the bill.

==== US ====
Due to the novelty of cultured meat, there are numerous regulations to regard cultured meat as safe for consumption through several procedures such as evaluation of cell cultivation practices, chemical safety, imports, and toxicity tests. In September 2020, the Food and Drug Administration (FDA) and the United States Department of Agriculture (USDA) have agreed to jointly regulate cultured meat. Under the agreement, the FDA oversees cell collection, cell banks, and cell growth and differentiation, while the USDA oversees the production and labeling of food products derived from the cells that are meant for human consumption. Firms that are involved in the culturing of animal cells for cultured meat are prompted to contact the FDA in order to begin the process of marketing the biological material.

Despite the strict regulations and efforts put in by the FDA and USDA, there have been struggles in gaining consumer trust and current livestock sector approval on cultured meat, with many states banning and restricting the labeling of cultured meat as "meat".

Several U.S. states, such as Missouri, South Carolina, Texas, and Washington, have passed legislation limiting the use of the term meat on cultured meat packaging.

Full bans on cultured meat have been enacted in Florida and Alabama: in Florida the law makes it a criminal offense to manufacture and sell, and in Alabama cultured meat has been illegal to manufacture, sell, or distribute since October 2024. The governments of Arizona, Kentucky, Tennessee, and West Virginia are considering similar laws.

In August 2024, Upside Foods sued Florida in an attempt to strike down their law.

== Differences from conventional meat ==
=== Health ===
Large-scale production of cultured meat may or may not require artificial growth hormones to be added to the culture for meat production. As cultured meat is grown in a sterile environment, there is no need for antibiotics. Today, the widespread use of antibiotics in conventional agriculture is the main driver of antibiotic resistance in humans. According to the World Health Organization, antimicrobial resistance represents "an increasingly serious threat to global public health that requires action across all government sectors and society" – predicting up to 10 million deaths annually by 2050. Cultured meat could provide an effective solution to help mitigate this major risk to human health.

Researchers have suggested that omega-3 fatty acids could be added to cultured meat as a health bonus. In a similar way, the omega-3 fatty acid content of conventional meat can be increased by altering what the animals are fed. Research is currently underway in Spain to develop cultivated meat with healthier fats, which could reduce cholesterol and the risk of colon cancer typically associated with red meat consumption. An issue of Time magazine suggested that the cell-cultured process may also decrease exposure of the meat to bacteria and disease.

Due to the strictly controlled and predictable environment, cultured meat production has been compared to vertical farming. Some of its proponents have predicted that it will have similar benefits in terms of reducing exposure to dangerous chemicals like pesticides and fungicides, severe injuries, and wildlife. There is also a lack of research on the comparison on the health effects of production cultured meat with the industrial meat or the biologic organic meat ways of production.

=== Artificiality ===
Although cultured meat consists of animal muscle cells, fat and support cells, as well as blood vessels, that are the same as in traditional meat, some consumers may find the high-tech production process unacceptable. Cultured meat has been described as fake or "Frankenmeat". On the other hand, cultured meat can be produced without the artificial hormones, antibiotics, steroids, medicine, and GMOs commonly used in factory farmed meat and seafood, though not used on organic biologic production. If a cultured meat product is different in appearance, taste, smell, texture, or other factors, it may not be commercially competitive with conventionally produced meat. The lack of bone and cardiovascular system is a disadvantage for dishes where these parts make appreciable culinary contributions. The lack of bones and/or blood may make many traditional meat preparations, such as buffalo wings, more palatable to some people. Furthermore, blood and bones could potentially be cultured in the future.

=== Environment ===
Animal production for food is a major cause of air/water pollution and carbon emissions. Significant questions have been raised about whether the traditional industry can meet the rapidly increasing demands for meat. Cultured meat may provide an environmentally conscious alternative to traditional meat production. The environmental impacts of cultured meat are expected to be significantly lower than from animal husbandry. For every hectare that is used for vertical farming and/or cultured meat manufacturing, anywhere between 10 and 20 hectares of land may be returned to its natural state. Vertical farms (in addition to cultured meat facilities) could exploit methane digesters to generate a portion of its electrical needs. Methane digesters could be built on site to transform the organic waste generated at the facility into biogas which is generally composed of 65% methane. This biogas could be burned to generate electricity for the greenhouse or a series of bioreactors.

One study reported that cultured meat was "potentially ... much more efficient and environmentally-friendly". It generated only 4% of greenhouse gas emissions, reduced the energy needs of meat production by up to 45%, and required only 2% of the land that the global meat/livestock industry does. In Tuomisto's life cycle analysis claimed that producing 1,000 kg of meat conventionally requires "26–33 GJ energy, 367–521 m^{3} water, 190–230 m^{2} land, and emits 1900–2240 kg CO_{2}-eq GHG emissions". On the other hand, producing the same quantity of meat in vitro has "7–45% lower energy use... 78–96% lower GHG emissions, 99% lower land use, and 82–96% lower water use".

The latest study by independent research firm CE Delft shows that—compared with conventional beef—cultured meat may cause up to 92% less greenhouse gas emissions if renewable energy is used in the production process, 93% less pollution, up to 95% less land use and 78% less water. There are many environmental concerns about intensive poultry farming that too can be reduced by cultivating their meat instead of farming animals. These concerns include microorganism and pharmaceutical-containing manure entering the water and soil, emission of greenhouse gasses such as nitrous oxide and methane, and the volatilization of manure particles.

Skeptic Margaret Mellon of the Union of Concerned Scientists speculates that the energy and fossil fuel requirements of large-scale cultured meat production may be more environmentally destructive than producing food off the land. S. L. Davis speculated that both vertical farming in urban areas and the activity of cultured meat facilities may cause relatively little harm to the wildlife that live around the facilities. Dickson Despommier speculated that natural resources may be spared from depletion due to vertical farming and cultured meat. One study reported that conventional farming kills ten wild animals per hectare each year.

=== Role of genetic modification ===
Techniques of genetic engineering, such as insertion, deletion, silencing, activation, or mutation of a gene, are not required to produce cultured meat. Cultured meat production allows the biological processes that normally occur within an animal to occur without the animal. Since cultured meat is grown in a controlled, artificial environment, some have commented that cultured meat more closely resembles hydroponic vegetables, rather than genetically modified vegetables.

More research is underway on cultured meat, and although cultured meat does not require genetic engineering, researchers may employ such techniques to improve quality and sustainability. Fortifying cultured meat with nutrients such as beneficial fatty acids is one improvement that can be facilitated through genetic modification. The same improvement can be made without genetic modification, by manipulating the conditions of the culture medium. Genetic modification may be able to enhance muscle cell proliferation. The introduction of myogenic regulatory factors, growth factors, or other gene products into muscle cells may increase production over that of conventional meat.

To avoid the use of any animal products, the use of photosynthetic algae and cyanobacteria has been proposed to produce the main ingredients for the culture media, as opposed to fetal bovine or horse serum. Some researchers propose that the ability of algae and cyanobacteria to produce ingredients for culture media can be improved with certain technologies, most likely not excluding genetic engineering.

=== Ethical ===
Australian bioethicist Julian Savulescu said, "Artificial meat stops cruelty to animals, is better for the environment, could be safer and more efficient, and even healthier. We have a moral obligation to support this kind of research. It gets the ethical two thumbs up." Animal welfare groups are generally in favor of cultured meat, because the culture process does not include a nervous system and therefore does not involve pain or infringement of rights. Reactions of vegetarians to cultured meat vary. Some feel the cultured meat presented to the public in August 2013 was not vegetarian because fetal bovine serum was used in the growth medium. However, since then, cultured meat has been grown with a medium that does not involve bovine serum. Philosopher Carlo Alvaro argues that the question of the morality of eating in vitro meat has been discussed only in terms of convenience. Alvaro proposes a virtue-oriented approach, suggesting that the determination to produce cultured meat stems from unvirtuous motives, i.e., "lack of temperance and misunderstanding of the role of food in human flourishing."

Some have proposed independent inquiries into the standards, laws, and regulations for cultured meat. Just as with many other foods, cultured meat needs technically sophisticated production methods that may be difficult for some communities, meaning they would lack self-sufficiency and be dependent on global food corporations. Some projects are focusing on making cellular agriculture accessible to all. The Shojinmeat Project, for instance, has a bottom-up approach, teaching participants to cultivate DIY cultured meat at home.

Establishing a similar parallel with cultured meat, some environmental activists claim that adopting a vegetarian diet may be a way of focusing on personal actions and righteous gestures rather than systemic change. Environmentalist Dave Riley states that "being meatless and guiltless seems seductively simple while environmental destruction rages around us", and writes that Mollison "insists that vegetarianism drives animals from the edible landscape so that their contribution to the food chain is lost".

=== Religious considerations ===
Jewish rabbinical authorities disagree whether cultured meat is kosher, meaning acceptable under Jewish law and practice. One factor is the nature of the animal from which the cells are sourced, whether it is a kosher or non-kosher species and whether, if the cells were taken from a dead animal, slaughter in accordance with religious practice had taken place prior to the extraction of cells. Most authorities agree that if the original cells were taken from a religiously slaughtered animal then the meat cultured from it will be kosher. Depending on the nature of the cells, it may be determined to be kosher even when taken from a live animal, and some have argued that it would be kosher even if coming from non-kosher animals such as pigs. In 2023 the issue of lab meat being a non-meat product or "pareve" has come up for debate. In 2023 the Chief Rabbi of Israel ruled that some types of cultured meat are kosher, and if not made to resemble meat, can have pareve status.

Islamic dietary practices have also been considered. Amid discussion following the presentation of the 2013 Maastricht burger, Abdul Qahir Qamar of the International Islamic Fiqh Academy said that cultured meat "will not be considered meat from live animals, but will be cultured meat." As long as the cells are not from pigs, dogs, and other haram animals, the meat would be considered vegetative and "similar to yogurt and fermented pickles."

Catholicism, which excludes eating meat in certain days along the year (Lent, Holy Week), has not pronounced on whether cultivated meat is banned (as it happens with meat) or not (as with any other food as vegetables or fish). Hinduism typically excludes the consumption of beef, such as steak and burgers. Chandra Kaushik, president of the Hindu Mahasabha, said about cultured beef that he would "not accept it being traded in a marketplace in any form or being used for a commercial purpose."

=== Economic ===
Cultured meat is significantly more costly than conventional meat. In a March 2015 interview, Post said that the marginal cost of his team's original €250,000 burger was now €8.00. He estimated that technological advancements would allow the product to be cost-competitive to traditionally sourced beef in approximately ten years. In 2018, Memphis Meats reduced the cost of production to $1,700 per pound. In 2019, Eat Just said it cost about US$50 to produce one chicken nugget. The company's cultured chicken nuggets, now available at Singapore restaurant 1880, retail around US$17 as part of a set meal; however, this retail price is below cost. As of 2021, most companies report a production cost of $100 or more per meal-sized serving. A 2019 study estimated that, with current technology, the actual production cost of cultured meat was over $400,000 per kilogram. A 2022 study estimated that, if dramatic advances drove medium costs down to $3.74 per liter, large-scale production costs might optimistically fall to $63 per kilogram over the next few years. The main drivers of cost would be growth medium (accounting for $19.7/kg), labor ($17.7/kg), and bioreactor repairs ($5.47/kg). Competing with wholesale beef ($6/kg) would require reducing all three of these costs.

=== Farmers ===
A scientific paper published in Front. Sustain. Food Syst. addresses the social and economic opportunities and challenges of cultured and plant-based meat for rural producers. According to this research, cellular agriculture offers "opportunities such as growing crops as ingredients for feedstock for cultured meat; raising animals for genetic material for cultured meat; producing cultured meat in bioreactors at the farm level; transitioning into new sectors; new market opportunities for blended and hybrid animal- and alt-meat products; and new value around regenerative or high-animal welfare farming." Some challenges are also identified, with possible "loss of livelihood or income for ranchers and livestock producers and for farmers growing crops for animal feed; barriers to transitioning into emerging alt-meat sectors; and the possibility of exclusion from those sectors." Some farmers already see the potential of cellular agriculture. For instance, Illtud Dunsford comes from a long line of farmers in Wales and established his cultured meat company Cellular Agriculture Ltd in 2016.

== Continuing development ==
=== Education ===
In 2015, Maastricht University hosted the first International Conference on Cultured Meat. New Harvest—a 501(c)(3) research institute—as well as The Good Food Institute host annual conferences to convene industry leaders, scientists, investors, and potential collaborators. The two organizations also fund public research and produce educational content. Organizations such as the Cellular Agriculture Society and similar organizations in Canada, France, Australia, and New Zealand were founded to advocate for cultured meat in their respective countries. Publications such as Cell Agri and Protein Report have also provided updates concerning technology and business within the field.

=== Research ===
Research continues on many fronts, including entomoculture, interactome maps of cardiac tissue, substrate design, scaffold design, nutritional profile, reaction kinetics, transport phenomena, mass transfer limitations and metabolic stoichiometric requirements, and bioprinting process.

=== Accelerators and incubators ===
Multiple venture capital firms and accelerator/incubator programs focus on assisting cultured technology startups, or plant-based protein companies in general. The Big Idea Ventures (BIV) Venture Capital firm launched their New Protein Fund to invest in emerging cell and plant-based food companies in New York and Singapore. They invested in MeliBio, Actual Veggies, Biftek.co, Orbillion Bio, Yoconut, Evo, WildFor and Novel Farms. Indie Bio is a biology oriented accelerator program that has invested in Memphis Meats, Geltor, New Age Meats and Finless Foods.

== In popular culture ==
Cultured meat has often featured in science fiction. The earliest mention may be in Two Planets (1897) by Kurd Lasswitz, where "synthetic meat" is one of the varieties of synthetic food introduced on Earth by Martians. Other notable books mentioning artificial meat include Methuselah's Children (1941) by Robert A. Heinlein; Ashes, Ashes (1943) by René Barjavel; The Space Merchants (1952) by Frederik Pohl and C.M. Kornbluth; The Restaurant at the End of the Universe (1980) by Douglas Adams; Le Transperceneige (Snowpiercer) (1982) by Jacques Lob and Jean-Marc Rochette; Neuromancer (1984) by William Gibson; Oryx and Crake (2003) by Margaret Atwood; Deadstock (2007) by Jeffrey Thomas; Accelerando (2005) by Charles Stross; Ware Tetralogy by Rudy Rucker; Divergent (2011) by Veronica Roth; and the Vorkosigan Saga (1986–2018) by Lois McMaster Bujold.

In film, artificial meat has featured prominently in Giulio Questi's 1968 drama La morte ha fatto l'uovo (Death Laid an Egg) and Claude Zidi's 1976 comedy L'aile ou la cuisse (The Wing or the Thigh). "Man-made" chickens also appear in David Lynch's 1977 surrealist horror, Eraserhead. Most recently, it was also featured prominently as the central theme of the movie Antiviral (2012). The Starship Enterprise from the TV and movie franchise Star Trek apparently provides a synthetic meat, although crews from The Next Generation and later use replicators. In the ABC sitcom Better Off Ted (2009–2010), the episode "Heroes" features Phil (Jonathan Slavin) and Lem (Malcolm Barrett) trying to grow cowless beef.

In the movie Galaxy Quest during the dinner scene, Tim Allen's character refers to his steak tasting like "real Iowa beef". In the videogame Project Eden, the player characters investigate a cultured meat company called Real Meat. In The Expanse, "vat-grown" meat is produced to feed the people who live on spaceships/space stations away from Earth, due to the exorbitant cost of importing real meat. Cultured meat was a subject on an episode of The Colbert Report on 17 March 2009.

In February 2014, a biotech startup called BiteLabs ran a campaign to generate popular support for artisanal salami made with meat cultured from celebrity tissue samples. The campaign became popular on Twitter, where users tweeted at celebrities asking them to donate muscle cells to the project. Media reactions to BiteLabs variously identified the startup as a satire on startup culture, celebrity culture, or as a discussion prompt on bioethical concerns. While BiteLabs claimed to be inspired by the success of Sergey Brin's burger, the company is seen as an example of critical design rather than an actual business venture.

In late 2016, cultured meat was involved in a case in the episode "How The Sausage Is Made" of CBS show Elementary. Cultured meat was profiled in the 2020 Canadian documentary film Meat the Future. In the 2020 video game Cyberpunk 2077, multiple cultured meat products are for sale, due to the high cost of natural meat. This includes "EEZYBEEF", made from in vitro cultured muscle cells taken from cattle, and the flatworm culture based "Orgiatic" which comes in several flavors.

== Related processes ==
=== Fermentation ===
Acellular agriculture is producing animal products synthesized from non-living material. Such products include milk, honey, eggs, cheese, and gelatin which are made of various proteins rather than cells. These proteins must be fermented much like in recombinant protein production, alcohol brewing and the generation of many plant-based products like tofu, tempeh and sauerkraut.

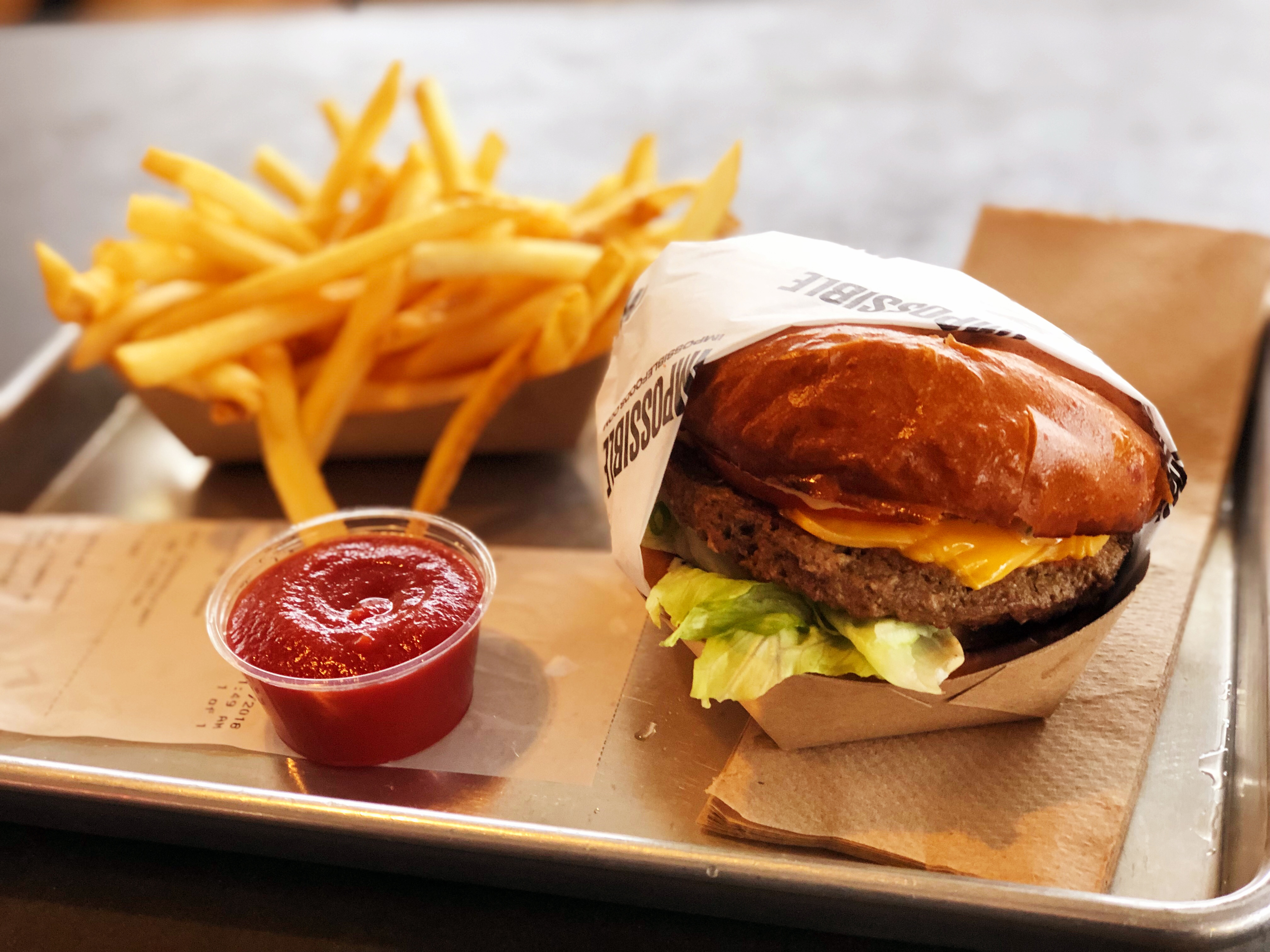
The Impossible Burger was made with fermented heme proteins.

Proteins are coded for by specific genes, the genes coding for the protein of interest are synthesized into a plasmid—a closed loop of double helical genetic information. This plasmid, called recombinant DNA, is then inserted into a bacterial specimen. For this to happen, the bacteria needs to be competent (i.e. able to accept foreign, extracellular DNA) and able to horizontally transfer genes (i.e. integrate the foreign genes into its own DNA). Horizontal gene transfer is significantly more challenging in eukaryotic organisms than prokaryotic organisms because the former have both a cell membrane and a nuclear membrane which the plasmid needs to penetrate whereas prokaryotic organisms only have a cell membrane. For this reason, prokaryotic bacteria are often favoured. In order to make such a bacteria temporarily competent, it can be exposed to a salt such as calcium chloride, which neutralizes the negative charges on the cell membrane's phosphate heads as well as the negative charges on the plasmid to prevent the two from repelling. The bacteria can incubate in warm water, opening large pores on the cell surface through which the plasmid can enter.

Next, the bacteria is fermented in sugar, which encourages it to grow and duplicate. In the process it expresses its DNA as well as the transferred plasmid resulting in protein. Finally, the solution is purified to separate out the residual protein. This can be done by introducing an antibody raised against the protein of interest that will kill bacteria cells that do not contain the protein. Through centrifugation, the solution can be spun around an axis with sufficient force to separate solids from liquids. Alternatively it could be soaked in a buffered ionic solution that employs osmosis to leach the water from bacteria and kill them.

== See also ==
- Meat analogue (meat alternative)
- List of meat substitutes
- Timeline of cellular agriculture
- Tissue culture
