= Shojinmeat Project =

Japanese non-profit for cultured meat

- Founded: February 2014
- Founder: Yuki Hanyu
- Legal status: Non-profit
- Location: Tokyo, Japan
- Field: Cultured meat
- Website: Official website (in English); Official website (in Japanese)

The Shojinmeat Project (Note: Officially styled in Japanese the same as in English, with Latin letters.) is a citizen science movement, loosely-structured non-profit organization, and art project about cell-cultured meat. Their approach to developing and popularizing cultured meat has been noted as unique from efforts in the field before it, in that it envisions cultured meat as something that can be made at home with a process understood by its consumer, analogous to home brewing. The Shojinmeat Project was created in Japan by Yuki Hanyu (Japanese: 羽生 雄毅), but has become an internationally collaborative effort welcoming a variety of talent.

The shōjin of Shojinmeat's name (Japanese: 精進) is a Japanese Buddhist term, meaning "devotion" to the path to Nirvana. Hanyu is not a Buddhist, but views the resource-intensive methods required for livestock meat such as deforestation as contrary to this path to Nirvana, and named Shojinmeat in tribute to the devotion required to follow that path successfully. The term is also part of shōjin ryōri, meaning "devotion cooking", the diet eaten by monks under the precept of not eating anything able to "run away when chased"; which has excluded nearly all kinds of animal-based meat until, arguably, the invention of cultured meat.

== History ==
In February 2014, Yuki Hanyu had held a PhD. in Chemistry and worked as a system engineer for Toshiba when he decided to apply his knowledge to some form of futuristic technology, having been interested in science fiction since childhood. Among other choices like space travel and energy, he chose cultured meat because of what he saw as a current global need, and determined a "do-it-yourself" community to be convenient in the effort to bring this newly emergent technology's cost down to a popularly accessible level.

His first partners in this project were obtained at an "informal coworking space in Tokyo" called Lab Café after he had asked for those skilled in cell culture to help him theorize how meat could be grown on Mars. It was here that Ikko Kawashima, future co-founder of IntegriCulture, joined the team.

The Shojinmeat Project has no formal definition of membership, though in 2020, Hanyu reckoned it to have between 20 and 30 active members. Official Slack channels, at one point, existed in Japanese and English for online collaboration.

== Content ==
=== Education ===
The Shojinmeat Project is involved in educating the general public about cultured meat, that is adults as well as children. They have written manuals about the science behind cultured meat as well as how it can be produced by individuals outside the setting of a business or laboratory. They have conveyed such information, also, through public presentations at schools and academic conferences.

Hanyu believes education and DIY is necessary to avoid cellular agriculture falling into corporate monopoly and, by extension, a further point of public controversy. He views the history of genetically modified organisms as a cautionary tale, and in an interview with Hive Life, stated that:

Instead, we’re building an open process where academic and scientific knowledge goes to the people rather than straight to the business to scale and deliver. This means that citizens and game players such as farmers, butchers, and chefs can get involved with hands-on experience, set the direction, decide on what meat should be like, and make society-wide agreements.

=== Fine Art ===
Hanyu's love of science fiction media that's served as an impetus and inspiration in this venture is something he believes can also work to the benefit of developing personal interest in others for what Shojinmeat teaches.

Thus, the Shojinmeat Project has spawned a sporadic gallery of artwork conveying visions of a future with cultured meat. The original characters Miyo and Aco feature in these works, showcasing futuristic cultured meat technologies in places such as on Mars and underwater. A VRChat environment of a cultured meat facility on Mars was created for Shojinmeat, and at least one fanzine associated with Shojinmeat has been sold at Comiket.

== Collaboration ==
IntegriCulture, Inc., a for-profit entity also founded by Yuki Hanyu, was registered in 2015 initially "as a vehicle to gain access to lab equipment" for Shojinmeat, and its operations continued to overlap with Shojinmeat's past the 2010s. Shojinmeat's Keita Fukumoto has discussed cultured meat in part of a 20-minute spot on NHK's News at 5, and Hanyu has given several interviews about the project to outlets covering food, business, and innovation in science. This includes one to New Harvest, with whom Shojinmeat has been featured in events and work, stemming from them, as well as the Good Food Institute, being in contact and collaboration since 2015.
