= Meatable =

Dutch food technology company

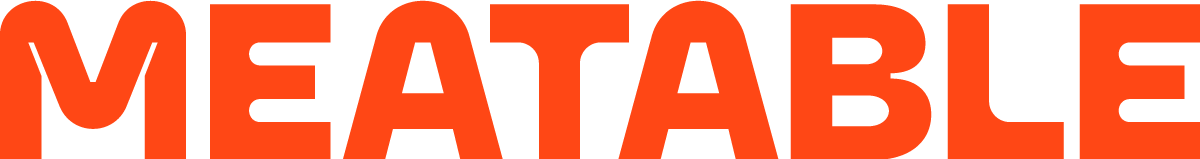
- Company type: Privately held company
- Industry: Food technology
- Founded: 2018
- Founders: Krijn de Nood, Daan Luining, Mark Kotter
- Headquarters: Delft, Netherlands
- Website: meatable.com

Meatable was a Dutch biotechnology company aimed at cultured meat, particularly pork.

== History ==
Meatable was co-founded by Krijn de Nood, Daan Luining, and Mark Kotter in 2018. It began operating on the campus of Delft University of Technology. and by 2018 reported it had succeeded growing meat using pluripotent stem cells from animal umbilical cords. becoming one of the first start-ups to eliminate fetal bovine serum. On 26 September 2018, Luining represented Meatable at a round table discussion on cultured meat in the Dutch House of Representatives. In early October 2018, Meatable attracted 3.5 million euros in funding from investors.

Meatable presented at the Consumer Electronics Show (CES) in Las Vegas in January 2020, stating that it sought to present proof of concept by the end of the year. By then, Meatable was working with scientists from Cambridge and Stanford to produce a hamburger within three weeks from a single stem cell via a process the company had patented.

In 2021, Meatable obtained funding from various investors worth 40 million euros (47 million US dollars). Its total capital at the time was approximately 53 million euros (60 million US dollars). By April 2021, the staff of Meatable had grown to over 40 people with 15 different nationalities, representing many different fields and coming from many universities. The same year, Meatable announced that it had entered into an agreement with DSM in order to 'make cultured meat affordable and accessible on a large scale.'

In April 2024, Meatable was the first company in the European Union to receive regulatory approval from the EFSA for a public tasting of cultured meat, in this case sausage.

After 7 years of operations (December 19, 2025), Meatable announced its dissolution due to its inability to obtain further funding from existing or new investors. Its net asset value to that date was reported to be £147 million.
