= SuperMeat =

Israeli startup company

- Type: Private
- Industry: Cultured meat
- Founded: 2015; 11 years ago
- Headquarters: Tel Aviv, Israel
- Website: supermeat.com

SuperMeat is an Israeli startup company working to develop a "meal-ready" chicken cultured meat product created through the use of cell culture.

== History ==
The company, which is crowdfunded through Indiegogo, claims that their product is more environmentally sound than conventional meat production as well as more economic, and involves no animal slaughter.

In January 2018, SuperMeat announced a $3M seed funding round by New Crop Capital and Stray Dog Capital, as well as a strategic partnership with the PHW Group, one of Europe’s largest poultry producers.

In May 2020, it was reported that SuperMeat planned to bring its cultured poultry to the market by 2022, aiming to sell at prices similar to slaughtered poultry products. In November 2020, SuperMeat opened a 'test restaurant' in Ness Ziona right next to its pilot plant; journalists, experts and a small number of consumers could book an appointment to taste the novel food there, while looking through a glass window into the production facility on the other side. The restaurant was not yet fully open to the public, because as of June 2021 SuperMeat still needed to wait for regulatory approval to start mass production for public consumption, and because the COVID-19 pandemic restricted restaurant operations. In March 2022, SuperMeat announced in a press release that it had entered into a partnership with food biotechnology company Ajinomoto to develop more cost-effective cell growth materials. In 2022, SuperMeat also tested consumer acceptance by serving crispy chicken sandwiches, letting participants decide between the traditional option and one containing cultivated meat.
