= Artificial meat =

Artificial meat(s) may refer to:

- Cultured meat, meat grown in cell cultures instead of inside animals
- Factory farming related meats, foodstuffs created in highly managed conditions
- Meat analogue, imitation meat products such as tofu, tempeh, textured vegetable protein (TVP), wheat gluten, pea protein, or mycoprotein

== See also ==
- Artificiality
- Meat (disambiguation)
