= Carlo Alvaro =

Italian-American author and philosophy professor

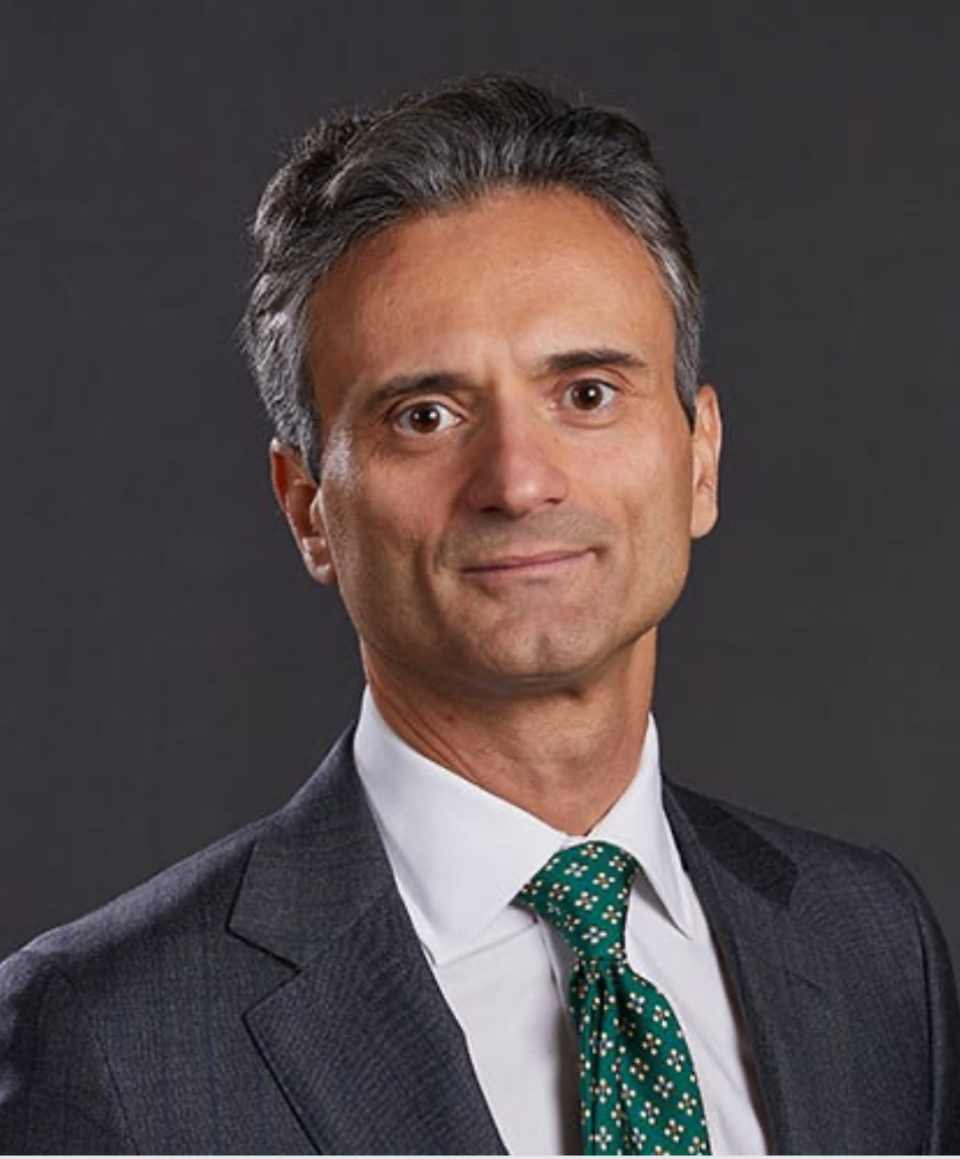
- Alvaro in 2024
- Born: Moncalieri, Turin, Italy
- Education: The City College of New York (BA); The New School For Social Research (MA, PhD)
- Occupations: Professional philosopher and author
- Spouse: Malaika D. Sims-Alvaro (2003-present)
- Children: 3
- Writing career
- Subjects: Analytic philosophy of religion, animal ethics and meta ethics
- Notable works: Ethical Veganism, Virtue Ethics, and the Great Soul

Carlo Alvaro is an Italian-American author and philosophy professor at New York City College of Technology of the City University of New York. Alvaro regularly lectures at the Fashion Institute of Technology, St. John's University, and St. Joseph's University.

Alvaro is an ethical vegan based on virtue-ethical principles. As an ethical vegan, Alvaro is opposed to cultured meat arguing the desire to produce and consume cultured meat stems from a lack of temperance, magnanimity, and compassion.

Alvaro also works in the fields of philosophy of religion and meta-ethics. He defends the existence of a deistic god based on the Kalam Cosmological Argument. Concerning morality, he is a moral realist.

== Selected publications ==
- Ethical Veganism, Virtue Ethics, and the Great Soul, Rowman & Littlefielf, 2019. ISBN 978-1-4985-9003-7
- Raw Veganism: The Philosophy of The Human Diet (Routledge Studies in Food, Society and the Environment), Routledge, 2020. ISBN 978-0-367-43539-4
- Deism: A Rational Journey from Disbelief to the Existence of God, Academica Press, 2021. ISBN 978-1-68053-245-6
- THE BOOK OF RAW: Why and How to Become a Raw Vegan, Independent Press, 2022. ISBN 979-8-8291-0273-9
- "A virtue-ethical approach to cultured meat." Nat Food 3, 788–790 (2022). doi:10.1038/s43016-022-00601-z
