= Wildtype (company) =

American food technology company

- Company type: Privately held company
- Industry: Food technology
- Founded: 2016
- Founders: Aryé Elfenbein and Justin Kolbeck
- Headquarters: San Francisco, California, United States
- Website: wildtypefoods.com

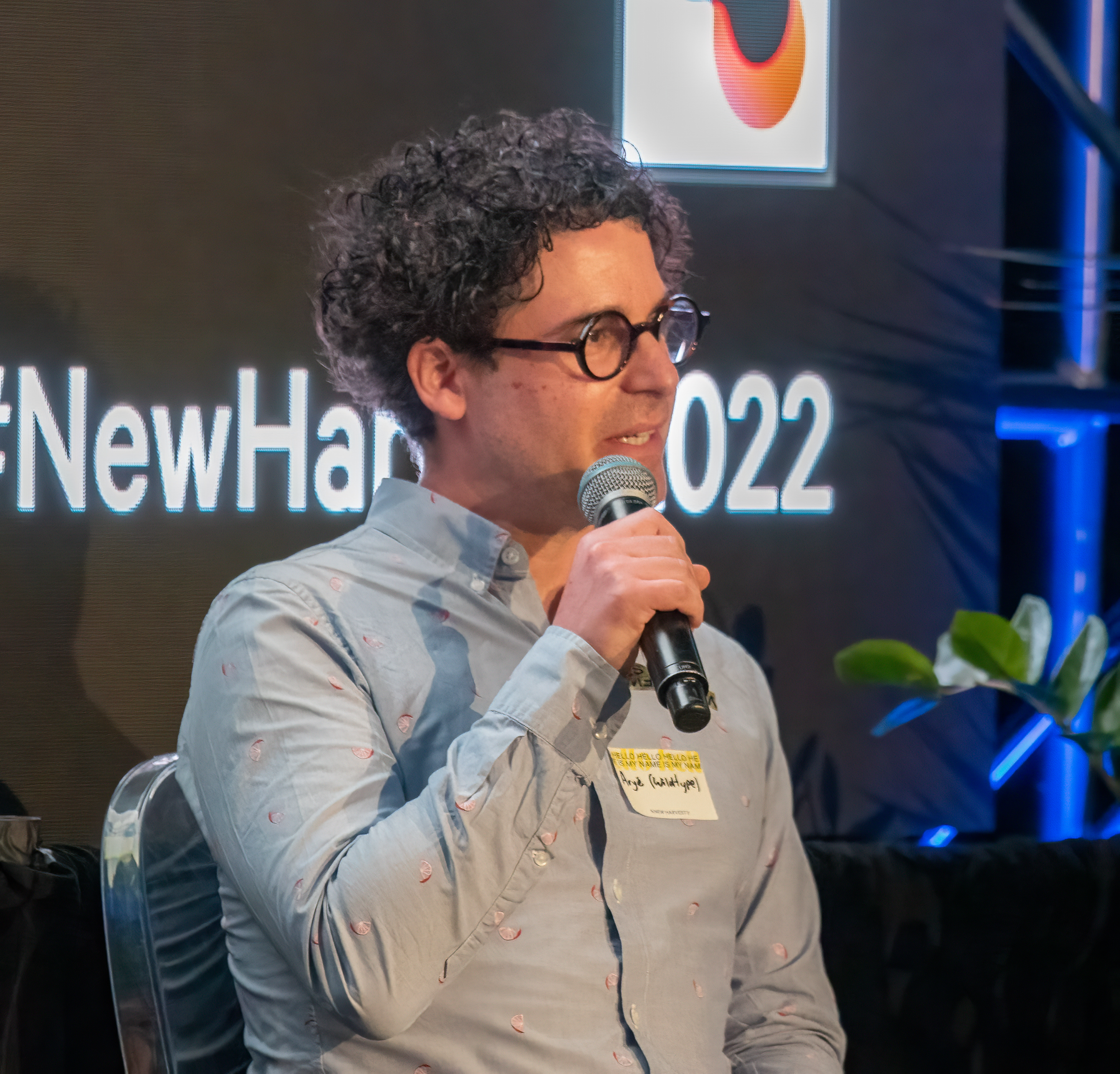
Elfenbein speaking at the 2022 New Harvest conference

Wildtype is an American seafood company that produces cultivated seafood from fish cells. Its headquarters is located in the Dogpatch neighborhood of San Francisco, California and includes a former microbrewery that has been converted into Wildtype's first Fishery where their cultivated seafood is produced. Wildtype's first product is cultivated Pacific salmon that will offer several benefits when compared to conventionally-harvested fish.

== History ==
=== Origins ===
Aryé Elfenbein (a PhD cardiologist) and Justin Kolbeck co-founded Wildtype in 2016. They started exploring funding possibilities in 2015, but after their applications for several government science grants yielded no results, they opted for venture capital instead. After raising a $3.5 million seed round in 2018, Wildtype launched its research and development.

=== Proof of concept ===
In June 2019, the company held a tasting at a restaurant in Portland, Oregon, where guests were served an array of dishes made with Wildtype's first cultivated salmon prototype. At the time, it took them 3.5 weeks to create the pound of salmon that was consumed at the tasting; the cost of producing just the spicy salmon roll was about 200 U.S. dollars. The company is working to bring down production costs to be competitive with conventional wild and farmed salmon.

=== Pilot plant ===
On June 24, 2021, Wildtype's pilot plant opened in San Francisco. At the time the startup had raised $16 million in funding. As of October 2021, it was capable of producing 50,000 pounds (22,680 kilograms) of salmon per year, which it claimed was scalable to 200,000 pounds (90,718 kilograms) a year.

=== Regulatory approval and market entry ===
On May 28, 2025, Wildtype obtained regulatory approval from the Food and Drug Administration (FDA) to sell its cultivated coho salmon (Oncorhynchus kisutch) product on the U.S. market. With that, Wildtype became the first start-up to be permitted to sell cultivated seafood in the United States, and a few days later, it was on the menu at the Kann restaurant of Gregory Gourdet in Portland, Oregon.
