= Steakholder Foods =

Israeli food technology company

Steakholder Foods Ltd
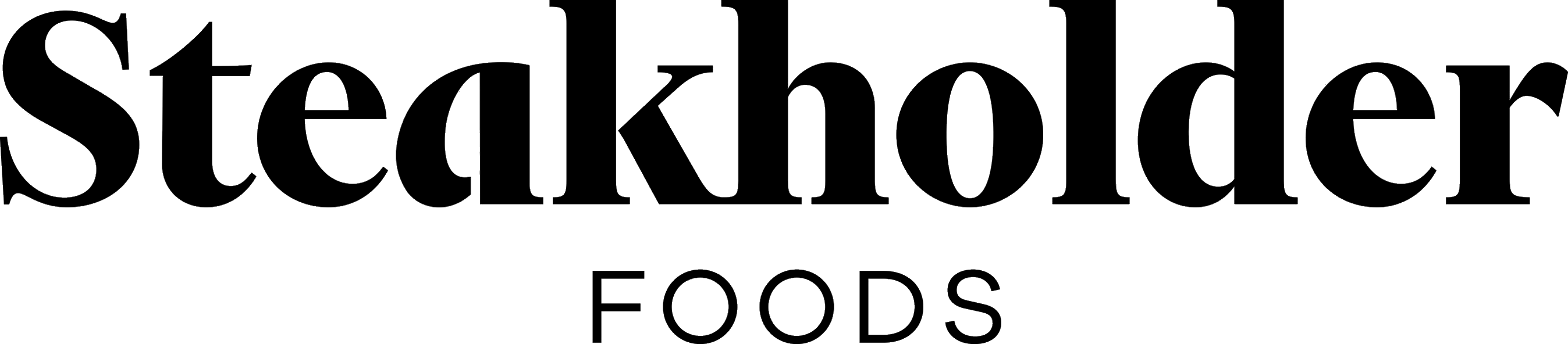
- Type: Public
- Traded as: Nasdaq: STKH
- Industry: Food technology
- Founders: Sharon Fima
- Headquarters: Ness Ziona, Israel
- Key people: Steve H. Lavin, Dirk von Heinrichshorst, Eva Sommer, David Brandes
- Subsidiaries: Peace of Meat (Antwerp, Belgium)
- Website: steakholderfoods.com

Steakholder Foods is an Israeli company which develops 3D bioprinting technologies for usage in cellular agriculture. Based in Israel, it has a Belgian subsidiary called Peace of Meat, with which it produces cultured meat, with a focus on cultivating foie gras. It was originally founded in 2019 as MeaTech 3D Ltd., or MeaTech for short.

== History ==
=== MeaTech 2019–2020 ===
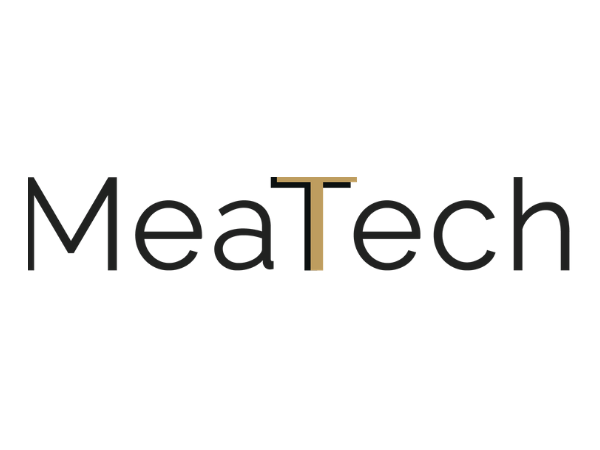
Former logo

MeaTech 3D was founded in 2019 and is headquartered in Ness Ziona, Israel. It is listed on the Nasdaq and Tel Aviv stock exchanges as "MITC". MeaTech manufactures technologies to produce alternative protein products, focusing on the production of cell-based beef and chicken.

=== Peace of Meat 2019–2020 ===
In 2019, the Foieture project was launched in Belgium with the goal of developing cultured foie gras (the name is a portmanteau of 'foie' and 'future') by a consortium of 3 companies: cultured-meat startup Peace of Meat, small meat-seasoning company Solina, and small pâté-producing company Nauta; and 3 non-profit institutes: university KU Leuven, food industry innovation centre Flanders Food, and Bio Base Europe Pilot Plant. Peace of Meat, co-founded by Eva Sommer, David Brandes and Dirk von Heinrichshorst, stated in December 2019 that it intended to complete its proof of concept in 2020, to sell its first cultured cell mass in 2022, and to go to market in 2023. That month, the Foieture project received a research grant of almost 3.6 million euros from the Innovation and Enterprise Agency of the Flemish Government. In early 2020, University of North Carolina professor Paul Mozdziak joined the Peace of Meat company.

Peace of Meat presented its proof of concept on 4 March 2020 at a novel food conference in Berlin. The prototype consisted of three chicken nuggets that were 80% plant-made and 20% cultured duck fat. Piece of Meat had built two laboratories in the Port of Antwerp, which entered into service in March 2020.

In May 2020, Peace of Meat's Austrian-born cofounder and scientific researcher Eva Sommer stated that the startup was then able to produce 20 grams of cultured fat at a cost of about 300 euros (€15,000/kg); the goal was to reduce the price to 6 euros per kilogram by 2030. In June 2020, she said that Peace of Meat aimed at producing 100,000,000 kilograms of cultured fat per year, to supply other food companies. Sommer commented that the COVID-19 pandemic has made people realise that 'many of the diseases of our time are caused by animals held for food production. Alternatives such as cultured meat are thus coming into view more than ever before.'

=== Merger (2020–2022) ===
In September 2020, an acquisition agreement was reached by which Peace of Meat would become a subsidiary to the Israeli 3D bioprinting developer MeaTech after a gradual merger. As part of the deal, MeaTech invested 1 million euros into Peace of Meat on 18 October 2020. The full cost of the acquisition was about 15 million euros, or 17.5 million US dollars. The acquisition of Peace of Meat by MeaTech was completed in early 2021.

In May 2021, MeaTech stated that it sought to establish and operate a full-scale pilot plant with 3D bioprinting technologies for cultured chicken fat production in Antwerp, Belgium in 2022. In September 2021, the company reported that it was now able to produce 700 grams of 100% cell-based chicken fat per production run.

=== Steakholder Foods (2022–present) ===
On 3 August 2022, the company has changed its name to Steakholder Foods to 'cultivate a new community of meat lovers'. 'As Steakholder Foods, our hope is to send a strong message to meat lovers around the globe that together we can and should create a world where people everywhere continue enjoying their favorite meat sustainably — for the health and welfare of the planet and all its inhabitants,' said CEO Arik Kaufman.
