= Upside Foods =

American food technology company

- Formerly: Memphis Meats
- Type: Privately held company
- Industry: Food technology
- Founded: 2015
- Founders: Uma Valeti; Nicholas Genovese; Will Clem
- Headquarters: Berkeley, California, US
- Website: upsidefoods.com

Upside Foods (formerly known as Memphis Meats) is a food technology company headquartered in Berkeley, California, aiming to grow sustainable cultured meat. The company was founded in 2015 by Uma Valeti (CEO), Nicholas Genovese (CSO), and Will Clem. Valeti was a cardiologist and a professor at the University of Minnesota.

The company plans to produce various meat products using biotechnology to induce stem cells to differentiate into muscle tissue, and to manufacture the meat products in bioreactors.

== History ==
In February 2016, Memphis Meats published a video of a cultured meatball and in March 2017, they published a video of cultured chicken and duck dishes. In February 2017, the company indicated its goal was to produce at 60 euros per kilogram and enter the market by 2020.

In August 2017, Memphis Meats announced that it had raised a $17 million Series A funding round. The round was led by DFJ and also included investment from Bill Gates, Richard Branson, Suzy and Jack Welch, Cargill, Kimbal Musk, and Atomico.

Initially, the production cost of the cultured beef was $18,000 per pound ($40,000/kg), and the production cost of the cultured poultry was $9,000 per pound ($20,000/kg). As of June 2017, the company had reduced the cost of production to below $2,400 per pound ($5,280/kg). The company said that it anticipated cost reductions and commercial release of its products by 2021.

In May 2021, the company announced that it was changing its name to Upside Foods. In September 2021, co-founder and chief science officer Genovese, as well as process development vice president KC Carswell, left the company.

On November 4, 2021, Upside Foods opened its first large-scale production plant, called the "Engineering, Production, and Innovation Center" (EPIC), in Emeryville, California. It covers 16,154 square meters (53,000 square feet), with renewably-powered vats and tubes, in order to produce 22,680 kilograms (50,000 pounds) of cultured meat annually, to be sold commercially.

On November 17, 2022, the FDA completed a pre-market consultation process for the company to sell its cultivated chicken to the public. This makes Upside Foods the first company to complete this pre-market consultation. The FDA made it clear in its announcement, however, that this was not considered an approval process.

On April 24, 2023, Upside Foods announced a range of new products made of chicken cells, plant protein, and seasoning ingredients. Additionally, the company developed a cell line that grows in a culture medium without platelet-derived growth factors, costing between $20,000 and $30,000 per gram. In May, the company's COO said that its first commercial plants would likely open later in 2023. In June, the U.S. Department of Agriculture gave Upside Foods regulatory approval for the label on its lab-grown chicken, making it the second company to receive approval in the United States. In September 2023, Upside Foods shared plans to build a facility in Glenview, Illinois. The 187,000 square-foot facility will be used to create nugget-like chicken products, which have yet to receive a green light from regulators.

On September 15, 2023, a report by Wired magazine revealed major issues with the company's bioreactor technology. According to the report, Upside Foods has been primarily relying on less efficient roller bottles, which require more work for a much smaller output and are incapable of cultivating full cuts of meat. In February 2024, the company announced it would no longer be building its planned Glenview facility and would instead focus on expanding its current facility in California. This was accompanied by a layoff, with another to follow in July. In June 2024, the company organized a public tasting of cultivated meat in Miami, Florida, called the "Freedom of Food". In March 2025, Upside Foods announced another round of layoffs.
