= Mirai Foods =

Swiss food technology company

Mirai International AG
- Type: Privately held company
- Industry: Food technology
- Founded: October 21, 2019
- Founder: Christoph Mayr & Suman Das
- Headquarters: Wädenswil, Zurich, Switzerland
- Website: miraiint.com

Mirai Foods, officially Mirai International AG, is a food technology company which produces cultivated meat from beef cells. It is headquartered in Wädenswil in the canton of Zurich in Switzerland, and was founded in 2019.

== History ==
The company was co-founded by Christoph Mayr (CEO) and Suman Das (Chief Scientific Officer) in 2019.

In March 2022 Mirai Foods announced that it had raised CHF 4.5 million seed funding. Major investors included German Family Office FRIBA Investment, Swiss Advanced Nutrition & Biotech VC Skyviews Life Science, Zürich based serial entrepreneur and tech investor Ulf Claesson, food company Paulig through its venture arm PINC, and technology investor Team Europe.

In August 2022, the company announced that they partnered with Shiok Meats and Gaia Foods to accelerate their production in Singapore and also the regulatory approval.

In November 2022 Mirai Foods announced that it would collaborate with German alternative proteins company Rügenwalder Mühle to produce a hybrid meat product, consisting of plant based proteins and cultivated fat. In the statement, they shared that the earliest go-to-market date for the joint product will be in 2025.
