= Entomoculture =

Cultured meat involving insect tissue

Entomoculture is the subfield of cellular agriculture which specifically deals with the production of insect tissue in vitro. It draws on principles more generally used in tissue engineering and has scientific similarities to Baculovirus Expression Vectors or soft robotics. The field has mainly been proposed because of its potential technical advantages over mammalian cells in generating cultivated meat. The name of the field was coined by Natalie Rubio at Tufts University.

== Process ==
Entomoculture functions along the same principles as cellular agriculture in general. First, embryonic cells are derived from an insect. Embryonic stem cells are totipotent cells, meaning they retain the capacity to differentiate into any or all of the different kinds of specialized cells. These cells can either be taken from primary cultures (directly from the animal) or from cryopreserved secondary cultures. These stem cells are then immersed into a culture medium so that they can proliferate. Culture media consist of basal media, which is a composition of the various nutrients essential to cell growth. This mixture diffuses into the cell and once it consumes enough, it divides and the population multiplies. To optimize growth, this culture media is generally supplemented with other proteins and growth factors. Such additives are frequently produced by recombinant protein production—translating the respective genes into bacteria that are then fermented to produce several copies of the protein. The proliferated number of stem cells can then be seeded onto a scaffold to initiate a larger composition or can be placed directly into a bioreactor. The bioreactor replicates the environmental characteristics that would otherwise be emulated in vivo, including temperature and osmolarity, to promote cell differentiation into muscle tissue.

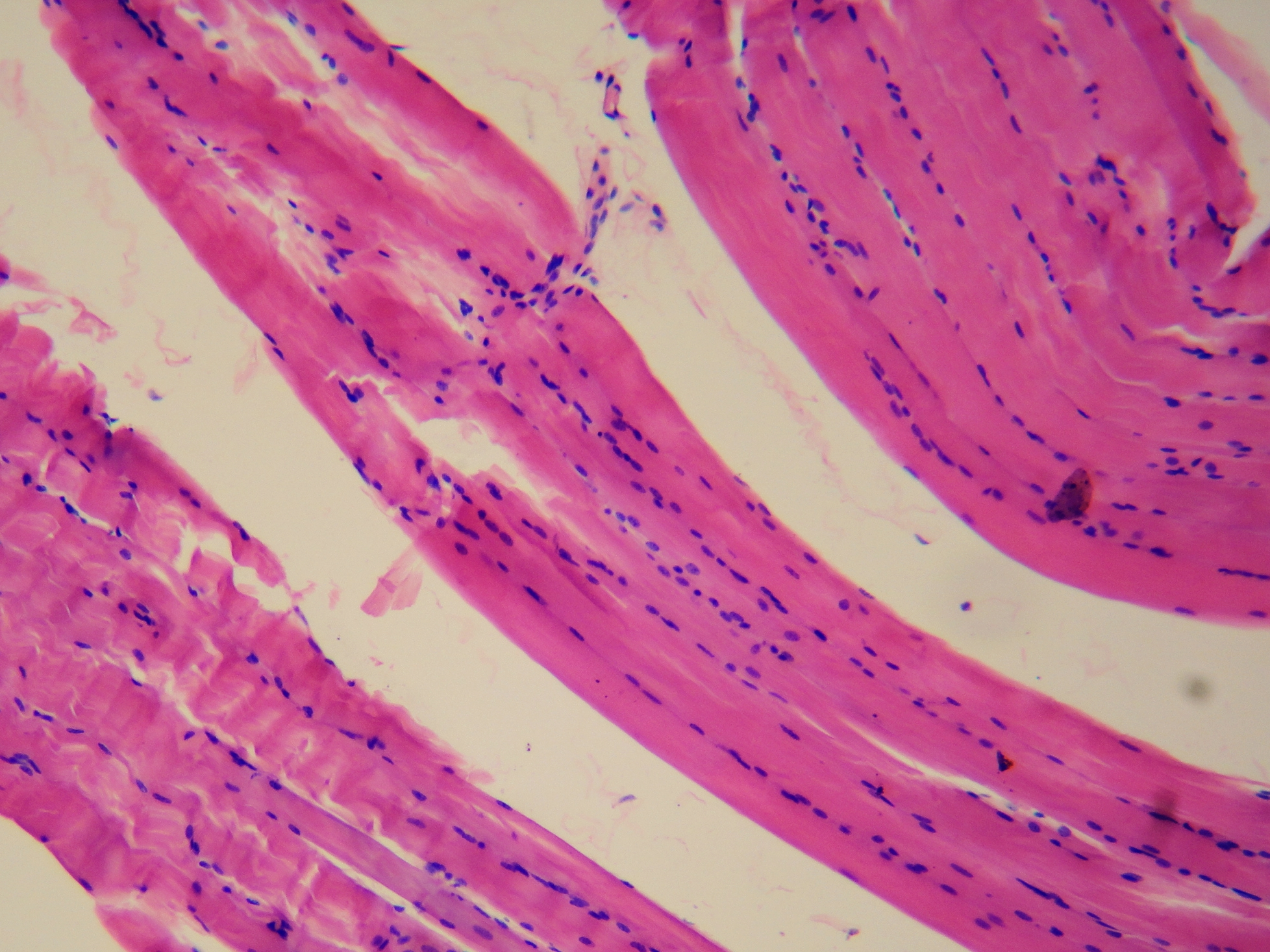
Founder cells and fusion-competent myoblasts connect to form multinucleated muscle fibres.

In the bioreactor, stem cells undergo myogenesis—the differentiation into muscle tissue. This is a complex process involving the formation of founder cells and fusion-competent myoblasts. About 4–25 of the fusion-competent myoblasts then fuse with one founder cell to create multinucleated myofibers, which collectively become larval muscle.

When muscle tissue is developed in vivo, the larval muscle is destroyed during metamorphosis. A similar process transpires involving the adult muscle precursors, which use the old larval muscle as a template to create the mature muscle. However this process is not of significant relevance in in vitro cultivation, as development is stopped prior to metamorphosis.

== Comparison to mammalian cell culture ==
In terms of cultured meat, entomoculture has mainly been proposed due to its potential advantages over mammalian cell culture. Such advantages can be ascribed to the differences in biology between the two cell types that enable insect cells to tolerate conditions more favourable for industrial production.

Temperature. Mammalian cells developing in vivo are incubated at 37 degrees Celsius. Simulating such a warm climate in a bioreactor requires energy inputs which thus increase production costs. Insect tissue can be grown to scale at room temperature or colder with little to no hindrance in cell development.

Culture conditions. As mammalian cells digest and metabolize glucose, they produce byproducts such as lactic acid which accumulate and acidify the cell's environment. The ability that cells have to uptake nutrients depends on the pH of the environment—it must be within a certain window for optimal growth. Lactic acid accumulation leads to inferior growth conditions for the cell. As such, the environment must be "rebalanced"—which is typically accomplished by replacing the entire culture medium as frequently as every 2–3 days. However, the saturated culture media may still contain viable nutrients, which makes the practise wasteful and expensive. Insect cells in part circumvent lactate production but are also tolerant to more acidic environments. When insect cell growth was compared at a pH of 5.5, 6.5 and 7.5, negligible difference was noted. As a result, insect cultures can have their media replaced at intervals as long as 90 days. This is compounded by the fact that insect cells do not deplete added nutrients as fast as mammalian cells. They consume triglycerides, glucose and proteins at a slower rate, suggesting that they have more efficient metabolic pathways. Additionally, insect cell cultures are typically contaminated with lipid cells called trophocytes or vitellophages, which are precursors to insect egg yolk cells. These cells are a natural source of fat that other insect cells can consume.

Osmolarity. Mammalian cells also require a relatively precise measure of carbon dioxide and oxygen to grow — as such, cultures are usually supplemented with an extra 5% carbon dioxide. Insects can go without this supplement.

Serum-free culture media. Culture media is an instrumental part of cellular agriculture and generating cultured tissue because it is effectively what allows scientists to begin with a relatively small sample of animal stem cells and end up with enough to constitute an entire tissue. To proliferate, a cell does not only require essential nutrients and macromolecules but also growth factors. When mammalian cells grow in vivo, these growth factors are supplied by the animal's blood. To replicate this, the culture medium usually consists of a basal mixture supplemented with extra growth factors. The basal medium makes up the bulk of the culture and contains most of the nutrients while the growth factors are added in trace amounts. As a result, the natural starting point is combining Fetal Bovine Serum (FBS) into the culture media.

FBS is somewhat controversial because it comes from the blood of a dairy cow fetus. The two issues with this is that it is a) reliant on animals, hence defeating the goal of cellular agriculture and b) expensive because it is so inaccessible. Additionally, from a scientific perspective, FBS is chemically undefined, meaning that its composition varies between animals. For the sake of research consistency, this is not desirable. The ideal culture medium is one that is simple, can stimulate proliferation, does not rely on animals, is accessible and is cheap. However, because mammalian cells rely on a complex array of growth factors, finding a culture medium that satisfies all five of these criteria is an ongoing challenge. Insect cells on the other hand, are biologically simpler organisms than mammals. They contain a fluid called hemolymph rather than blood, so they do not rely on all the same growth factors as mammalian cells. Instead, insect cell medium typically uses a basal medium (such as Eagle's Medium, Grace's Insect Medium or Schneider's Drosophila Medium), which is supplemented with plant based additives such as yeastolate, primatone RL, hydrolysates, pluronic lipids and peptides.

Suspension cultures. When mammalian muscle cells grow in vivo, a fundamental part of their proliferation relies on their attachment to the extracellular matrix (ECM). To replicate this relationship, mammalian cells are usually cultured in adherent monolayers — cultures where the cells grow on a substrate in layers only one cell thick. This necessitates using bioreactors with a lot of surface area that, when scaled up to the industrial level, is unfeasible. The alternative is to use microcarriers, which are small pieces of material that float in the culture medium to increase the overall surface area the cells can attach to. This also introduces the need to vascularize. When mammalian cells are grown in adherent cultures, the cells not in direct contact with culture medium stop growing, forming necrotic centres. Unlike mammalian cells, insect cells are also able to grow unattached to anything — or in suspension cultures. This means that bioreactors do not need a large surface area, and can instead be produced in much more practical shapes.
