= Vertrokken onbekend waarheen =

Vertrokken onbekend waarheen (VOW) is a Dutch term meaning "left town, destination unknown", used in resident registrations for a person who does not live at his registered address in the Netherlands anymore, while it is unknown where he lives now, not even in which country. In most cases the person has not registered that he left; in some cases he did, without specifying a destination. Some have left the country, others still live in the country without being registered. Such people are also referred to as spookburgers, or "phantom citizens".

The reasons may include neglect, but also tax evasion and/or avoiding arrest for a crime. The downside for the person is that he cannot get benefits such as (for a Dutch person) getting a passport, and for anyone still living in the country, being allowed to work and to send his children to school, getting social security, etc.

According to a 2011 report by the Dutch Bureau of Statistics, the number of VOWs in the Netherlands has been steadily increasing since 1996, which is not surprising, because those who leave the country and do not return, often remain out-of-sight indefinitely. VOWs are mostly male and under the age of 45.

During the Second World War many VOWs referred to Jewish people who left their official address to live somewhere else without registration, to avoid deportation. This included people who were forced to leave their town and to start living in Amsterdam (from where they would be deported later). In the city of Haarlem in 1942, 121 Jewish people were registered as "VOW" of the 925 members of the registered local Jewish community, and by the end of the war the total number of Jewish VOWs was estimated to be between 750 and 1000.
