= Vow (company) =

Australian cultured meat company

- Company type: Private
- Industry: Cultured meat
- Founded: 2019
- Founders: George Peppou, Tim Noakesmith
- Headquarters: Sydney, Australia
- Area served: Australia, New Zealand, Hong Kong, Singapore
- Key people: George Peppou (CEO), Ellen Dinsmoor (COO)
- Products: Forged Parfait, a cultured meat product from Japanese Quail DNA
- Number of employees: 65
- Website: eatvow.com

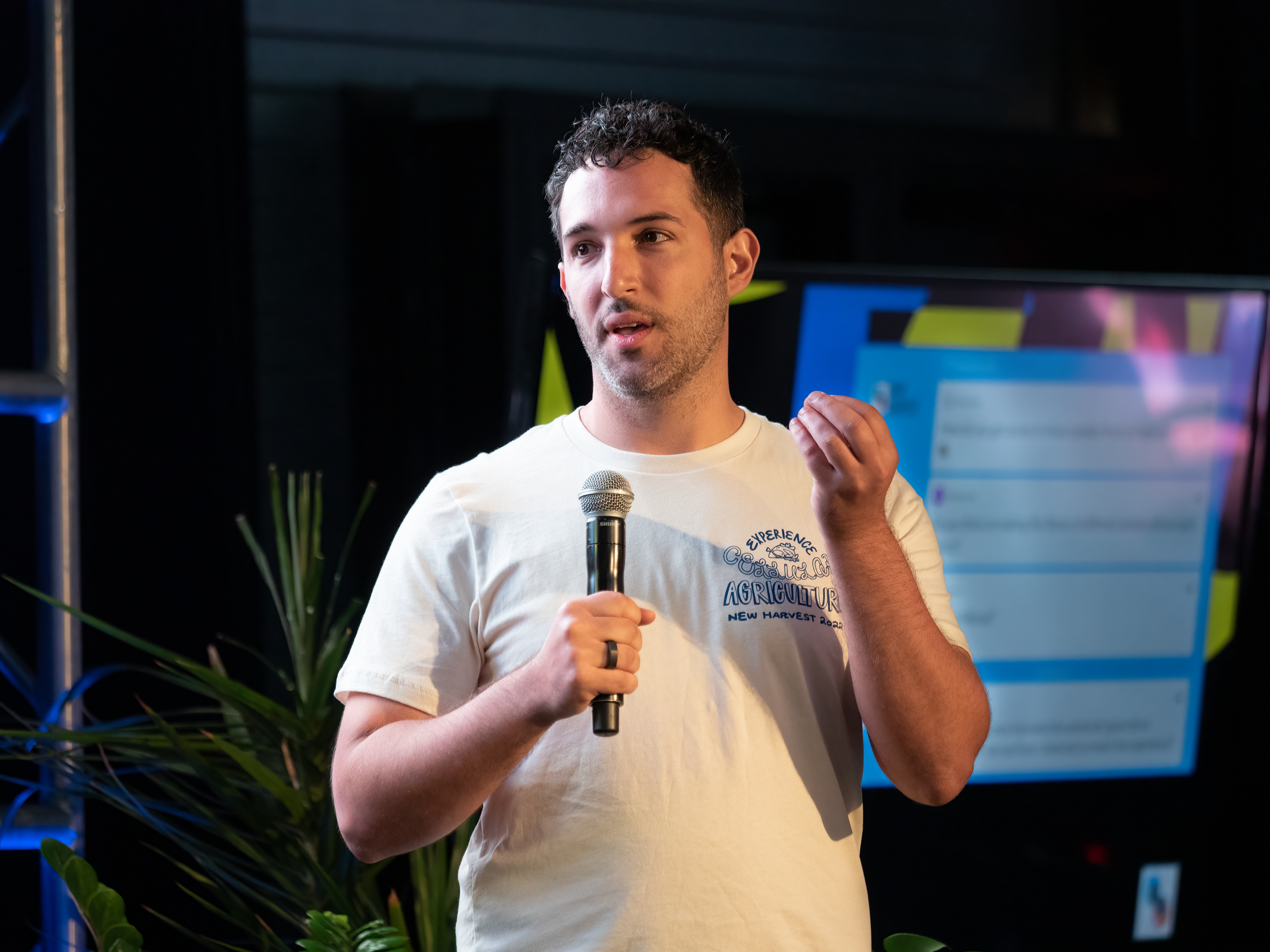
George Peppou speaking at the 2022 New Harvest conference

Vow is an Australian company that grows cultured meat for commercial distribution, and is headquartered in Sydney, Australia.

== History ==
Vow was founded in 2019 by George Peppou (CEO) and Tim Noakesmith (CCO). Ellen Dinsmoor is their COO.

In July 2019, Vow demonstrated a kangaroo dumpling, the first non-farmed meat demonstrated using cultured meat technology. In August 2020 they demonstrated a further five species in partnership with Australian chef Neil Perry. During 2020, the company was criticised for plans to produce zebra meat.

In August 2021, the company announced they were developing hybrid products containing cultured meat and ingredients produced using precision fermentation technology. The company said that work was being done in the areas of chicken, crocodile, kangaroo and water buffalo meat. During an interview on The Drum in January 2022, the company announced that their first product would be crocodile and would be launching in Singapore.

In November 2022, Vow announced they are launching Morsel, which is cultured Umai Quail. In 2023, it developed a "mammoth meatball" as a publicity stunt, which was put on display at Museum Boerhaave. The meatball was made from portions of lamb, mammoth, and African elephant DNA, piecing together DNA similar to the mammoth genome, then grown in a sheep muscle cell.

Australian and New Zealand regulatory bodies began reviewing Vow's cultured meat products for approval in December 2023. In April 2024, Singapore was the first government to approve the meat for commercial sale. That month, Vow began selling its first commercial product there, Forged Parfait, made with Japanese quail cells. On 7 April 2025, Vow quail became the first cultured meat product to be officially approved for sale in Australia and New Zealand. In mid-June 2025, Vow expected to be serving its cultivated quail in restaurants in Sydney and Melbourne "within weeks".

== Products and operations ==
Vow develops, manufactures, and markets cultured meat products that are grown in large vats, similar to a brewery in a four-week process. As of June 2025, all of its commercial products are based on cells from a Japanese quail. Vow uses a cell sample from connective tissue in the Japanese quail that contains both fat and protein. The cells feed on a vegetarian broth of vitamins, amino acids, and minerals in a bioreactor. The cells are moved into larger vats as they multiply, eventually being in a 20,000 liter bioreactor. The cultured meat is then cooked and combined with other ingredients.

Vow focuses on creating new meats, rather than copying mass produced meats like chicken. Vow sells and markets a pâté, a foie gras, an edible tallow candle, and a smoked butter spread. The meat cells are mixed with other ingredients. For example, the pâté contains butter, shallots, tapioca starch, wine, garlic, and other spices.

As of June 2025, Vow has 35,000 liters of bioreactor capacity. It operates the largest food-producing bioreactor in the world at 20,000 liters, called Andromeda. In June 2025, it harvested 2,000 pounds of cultured meat.
