= MeliBio =

American bee-free honey company

- Type: Subsidiary
- Founded: 2020
- Founders: Darko Mandich; Aaron Schaller
- Headquarters: Oakland, California, U.S.
- Parent: FoodYoung Labs
- Website: www.melibio.com

MeliBio is an American food tech company that replaces the use of honeybees with microorganisms as a medium for honey production. The company was founded in 2020 by Darko Mandich and Aaron Schaller.

MeliBio is based in Oakland, California.

== History ==
MeliBio was founded in 2020 by Darko Mandich and Aaron Schaller in Berkeley, California. The company uses plant science and precision fermentation to create a product molecularly identical to honey without the need for bees.

In March 2022, MeliBio raised $5.7 million in seed funding. The round was led by Astanor Ventures.

In March 2023, MeliBio launched Mellody, its plant-based honey product.

MeliBio was affected by the collapse of Silicon Valley Bank in 2023, with up to 90% of the company's assets reportedly held at the bank.

In May 2025, MeliBio was acquired by FoodYoung Labs, a Swiss innovation lab and venture studio based in Balerna, Switzerland. The deal covered the Mellody brand along with MeliBio's plant-based honey technology and related intellectual property, but did not include the company's precision fermentation technology.
