= Bioart & Design Award =

- Native name: BAD Award
- Description: Competition for interdisciplinary bioart and design research
- Country: Netherlands
- Presented by: NWO, ZonMW, and MU Hybrid Art House
- Reward: €25,000
- Website: https://www.badaward.nl/

The Bioart & Design Award (BAD) is a Netherlands-based bioart competition that focusses on interdisciplinary thinking and art-based research. Dutch and international participants are judged by an international jury, with winners receiving 25.000€ each to further realise their bioart research projects. The most recent edition of the annual award to date took place in 2024.

== Overview ==
The first bioart and design competition took place in 2010 under the name Designers & Artists 4 Genomics Award (DA4GA) which it kept until 2013. Since then the award has collaborated with various Dutch art and cultural research institutions, including the Netherlands Genomics Initiative, Naturalis Biodiversity Center, Centre for Society & Genomics, ZonMw, NWO, Mu Hybrid Art House, Waag Futurelab, Bio Art Laboratories, and other educational partners.

The award matches recent art and design graduates with researchers to create bioart projects that can then be entered and exhibited as part of the competition. After participating in a matchmaking event, teams consisting of both artists and researchers propose their projects to an international jury. The three winning teams receive the price money of 25.000€ and have six months to create their bioart pieces, which are then exhibited at the end of the year.

== Science communication and impact study ==
In 2017, an impact study was conducted on the science communication potential and influence on the artistic and research creations by participants of the award. It uses a mixed methods approach consisting of a survey and interviews with everyone involved in setting up, judging and participating in the competition. The study revealed that participating in the competition as a researcher made them re-evaluate their own approaches to scientific thinking towards a more art-based, interdisciplinary way. Additionally, the collaboration between recently graduated design and art students and life sciences researchers fostered a development of new scientific tools and research methodologies. The study was published again in a book about the award in 2022 by design writer William Myers.

== Winners ==
All recorded winners and projects of the Bioart & Design Award
Year	Winners	Artwork Title
2010	Jalila Essaïdi with Marcel Piët	Bulletproof Skin: 2.6g 329m/s
2010	Maurizio Montalti with Prof. Dr. Han Wösten	System Synthetics
2010	Matthijs Munnik with Richard de Boer	Microscopic Opera
2011	Tiddo Bakker with Henk Jalink & Rob van der Schoor	In Vena Verbum
2011	Center for Genomic Gastronomy	Eat Less, Live More – and Pray for Beans
2011	Susana Cámara Leret & Mike Thompson with Jan van der Greef	Aqua Vita
2012	Charlotte Jarvis with Christine Mummery, Christian Freund & Harold Mikkers	Ergo Sum
2012	Haseeb Ahmed with Jos Kleinjans	Fish Bone Chapel
2012	Laura Cinti & Howard Boland with Bela Mulder & Tom Shimizu	Living Mirror
2014	Studio PSK with Jan Komdeur	The Economics of Evolution: The Perfect Pigeon
2014	Špela Petrič with Klaas Timmermans	Naval Gazing
2014	Julia Kaisinger & Katharina Unger with Prof. Dr. Han Wösten & Kasia Lukasiewiecz	Fungi Mutarium (Growing Food From Toxic Waste)
2015	Emma Dorothy Conley with Guus Roeselers	MSA: Microbiome Security Agency
2015	Isaac Monté with Toby Kiers	The Art of Deception
2015	Agi Haines with Marcel de Jeu & Jos van der Geest	Drones with Desires
2016	Lilian van Daal & Roos Meerman with Renée van Amerongen	Dynamorphosis, the beauty of inner mechanisms
2016	Pei-Ying Lin with Miranda de Graaf	Tame is to Tame
2016	Cecilia Jonsson with Rodrigo Leite de Oliveira	Haem
2017	Jiwon Woo with Prof. Dr. Han Wösten	Mother’s Hand Taste (Son-mat)
2017	Xandra van der Eijk with Han Lindeboom	Seasynthesis
2017	Guo Cheng with Heather Leslie	A Felicitous Neo-Past
2018	Baum & Leahy with Stefan Schouten, Julie Lattaud, Laura Schreuder and Gabriella Weiss	Microbiocene: Ancient ooze to future myths
2018	Ani Liu with Mario Maas, Matthias Cabri and Onno Baur	No regrets for what you haven't been, Be the ghost you want to see in the machine
2018	Yiyun Chen with Patrick Schrauwen & Vera Schrauwen-Hinderling	Horizontal Living
2019	Jonathan Ho & Joris Koene	Sex Shells
2019	Emma van der Leest, Aneta Schaap-Oziemlak, Paul Verweij & Sybren De Hoog	Fungkee | Fungal Supercoatings
2019	Michael Sedbon & Raoul Frese	CMD: Experiments in Bio-Algorithmic-Politics
2020	Nadine Botha with Henry de Vries	The Orders of the Undead
2020	Sissel Marie Tonn with Heather Leslie & Juan Garcia Vallejo	Becoming a Sentinel Species
2020	Dasha Tsapenko with Prof. Dr. Han Wösten	Fur_tilize
2022	Nonhuman Nonsense with Marte Stoorvogel	Mud & Flood: The Return of Nehalennia
2022	Marlot Meyer with Marcel de Jeu & Jos van der Gees	Hacking Heuristics
2022	Kuang-Yi Ku with Henry de Vries	Filthy Anatomy
2023	Anna Vershinina with Wieger Wamelink	ExoGarden 3D-Printed Modular Eco-Habitats for Earth and Space
2023	pamela varela & ella hebendanz with Joris Koene	re-c(O)unting: bodies, stories, laboratories
2023	Hung Lu Chan & Floris de Lange	Close Encounters with Inner Aliens
2024	Carla Alcalà Badias & Laura Villanueva	Microbial Prophetesses
2024	Emilia Tapprest & Samar Khan	Ecotonal Beings
