= Center for Genomic Gastronomy =

International art collective

The Center for Genomic Gastronomy
- Founded: 2010
- Field: Contemporary Art
- Website: genomicgastronomy.com

The Center for Genomic Gastronomy is an independent research group that examines the biotechnology and biodiversity of human food systems. The Center was founded in 2010 in Portland, Oregon and currently has research nodes in Bergen; Santa Cruz, CA; Porto; Dublin and Chennai. They are sometimes described as an artist-led think tank.

Along with groups such as Fallen Fruit, Futurefarmers, Tissue Culture & Art Project, Environmental Health Clinic they have been described as being part of a green avant-garde.

== Mission & Research ==
The mission of the group is to map food controversies, prototype alternative culinary futures and imagine a more just, biodiverse & beautiful food system.

Their Research is split into five primary research streams:

- Cultures of Biotechnology
- Eating in the Anthropocene
- Databases of Taste
- Protein Futures
- Food Phreaking

== Images ==
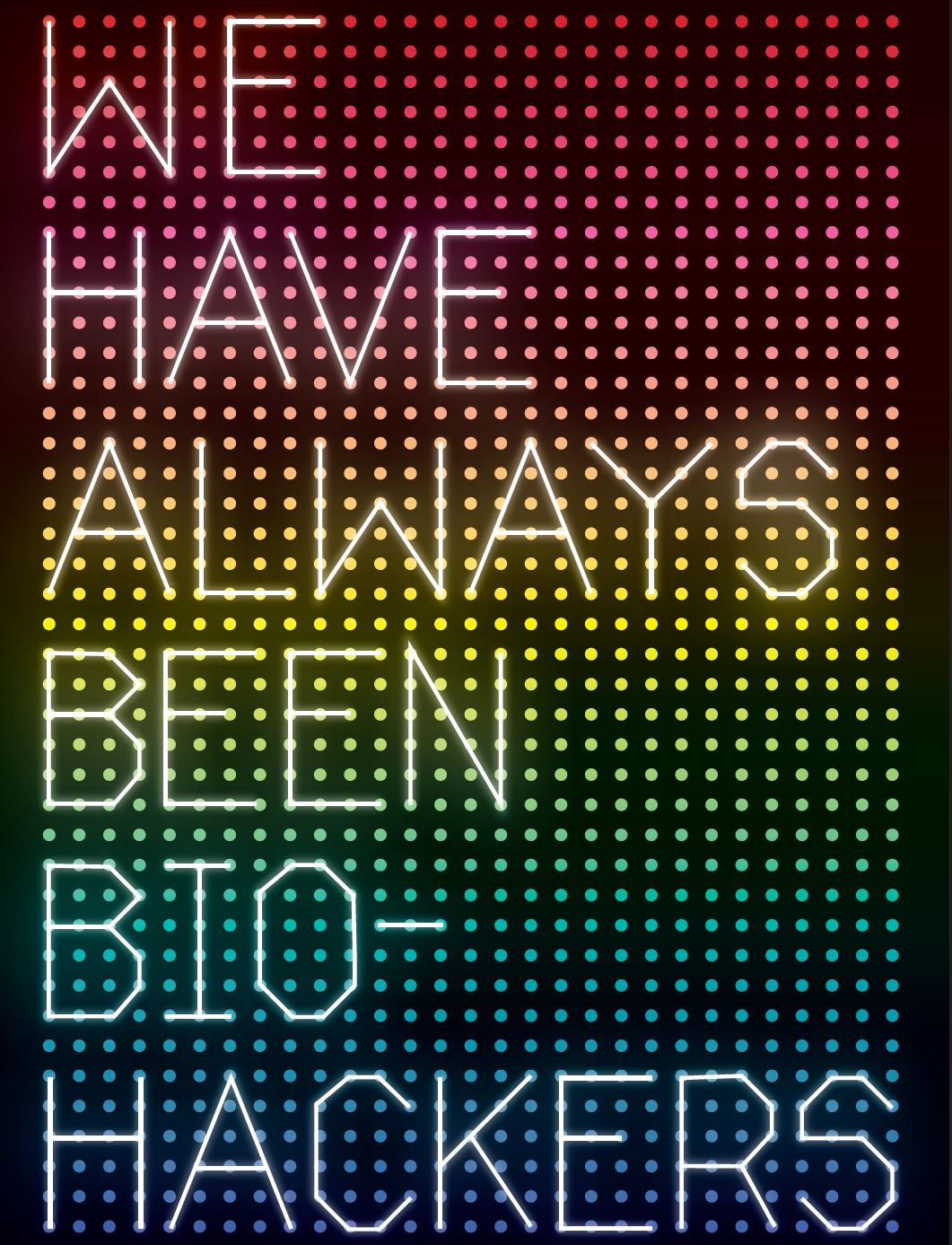
WHABBH poster designed by the Center for Genomic Gastronomy (2010)

== Publications and Press ==
The Center for Genomic Gastronomy's research has been featured and reviewed in The Lancet, Nature, and Chemical & Engineering News.

Their work has been featured in books and anthologies such as Bio Art: Altered Realities and Neo.Life: 25 Visions for The Future of Our Species.

== Selected works ==
=== The Glowing Sushi Cooking Show ===
The Glowing Sushi Cooking Show (2010) was an online cook show that "uses everyday ingredients and some simple kitchen chemistry to explore cutting edge biotechnology." and "finds an unexpected use for the first genetically engineered animal you can buy."

According to scholar Lindsay Kelley "Fish do not usually cross the pet/meat divide, with pet species kept separate from species that are farmed or caught as food. Glowing Sushi confuses these boundaries, collapsing the laboratory, kitchen, and aquarium to illustrate the ways in which a Glo-Fish's tranimality crosses and complicates relations between jellies, zebrafish, and humans."

=== EDIBLE Exhibition ===
EDIBLE: The Taste of Things to Come (2012) was an exhibition curated by the Center for Genomic Gastronomy at Science Gallery, Trinity College Dublin.

In addition to exhibits, the show included events like curated meals, talks from local and international foodies, and selected recipes. A major component of the exhibition were the feeding times, prepared by the in-gallery kitchen, where visitors got the chance to experience various ingredients and curious tasters such as the vegan ortolan created by the Center for Genomic Gastronomy.

=== Food Phreaking ===
FOOD PHREAKING (2013-present) is the journal of experiments, exploits and explorations of the human food system. Each issue contains stories about the space where food, technology & open culture meet. In the introduction of the book Literature and Food Studies the authors use Food Phreaking as a case study to argue for the importance of close readings of vernacular literary practices.

== Influences ==
The Center for Genomic Gastronomy has been influenced by the following artists:

- Agnes Denes
- Carl Cheng
- Center for Land Use Interpretation
- Critical Art Ensemble
- Free Art and Technology Lab
- Graffiti Research Lab
- Hackteria
- Institute for Applied Autonomy
- Mierle Laderman Ukeles
- Natalie Jeremijenko
- Peter Fend
- S.W.A.M.P.
- Yashas Shetty

== See also ==
- Molecular Gastronomy
- Do-it-yourself biology
