= Guy Ben-Ary =

Australian bio-artist and researcher

- Born: 1967 (age 58–59); Los Angeles, California, U.S.
- Education: University of Western Australia
- Known for: Bio-art, cybernetics, tissue engineering, neural networks
- Movement: Bio-art, Electronic art
- Website: https://www.guybenary.com/

Guy Ben-Ary, is an Australian bio-artist and researcher specilizing in biotechnological art. Based in Perth, he has worked as a core researcher at SymbioticA, an artistic laboratory focused on the life sciences at the University of Western Australia. His work combines biological tissues, sound synthesis, and robotics to investigate themes related to life, consciousness, and identity.

== Early life and education ==
Guy Ben-Ary was born in 1967 in Los Angeles, California, and spent his early years in Israel. Ben-Ary's academic background includes studies in the humanities and law, which informed his interest in societal structures and ethics before his shift toward the Arts. He earned his a Bachelor of Arts and Bachelor of Laws (LLB) degree in Tel Aviv University.

== Career ==
Guy Ben-Ary began his career in 1999 working at the intersection of art and science through collaborative art projects. In 2001, he joined SymbioticA, the Centre of Excellence for Biological Arts at the University of Western Australia, as a core researcher and artist. His early work focused on the cultural implications of emerging biotechnologies, particularly the concept of "Iiminal life," referring to biological matter existing between living tissue and machine. Using collaborative and interdisciplinary approaches, his projects involved interfacing in real-time to living, biological neural networks and integrating them with robotic systems to interact with the physical environment.

Ben-Ary's artistic practice began with his participation in the Tissue Culture and Art Project from 1999 to 2003, collaborating with artists Oron Catts and lonat Zurr. His uses biological laboratory techniques such as tissue culture, tissue engineering, electrophysiology, and microscopy as part of his artistic process. His work addresses themes at the intersection of art and science, including life and death, cybernetics, artificial life and intelligence. He employs biotechnologies in a subversive way and attempts to challenge conventional perspectives, presenting scenarios that aim to provoke public discussion on emerging biotechnologies. Ben-Ary's early projects include Fish and Chips (2001), MEART (2001–2005), Silent Barrage (2009–2013), In-Potentia (2013–2017) and Snowflake (2015 – 2021). These works involved the cultivation of in-vitro neural networks, sometimes described as "brains," grown on specialized electrophysiological interfaces and integrated with robotic bodies or systems. Other notable early work of Ben-Ary that didn't use neural networks is the living screen where he and his colleagues develop an apparatus (the Bio-projector) that allowed them to project movies on living cells.

In 2015, Ben-Ary presented cellF, along with Nathan Thompson, Darren Moore, Andrew Fitch, and Stuart Hodgetts, a project he began developing in 2012 and described as the world's first neural synthesiser. For the work, Ben-Ary underwent a biopsy on his arm and cultivated his own skin cells at SymbioticA, using induced pluripotent stem cell (iPSC) technology to reprogram them first into stem cells and then into neurons. This living neural network, grown over a multi-electrode array (MEA) dish, functioned as an external, in-vitro version of the artist's own brain, controlling a set of custom-built analogue modular synthesizers in real time. In live performances, human musicians played alongside cellF, with their music fed to the neurons as electrical stimulation, to which the network responded by controlling the synthesizers in improvised "jam sessions." In February 2020, Ben-Ary, together with Nathan Thompson and scientist Sebastian Diecke, presented Bricolage, a performative biological kinetic installation. Produced by the Perth International Arts Festival, the installation features living microscopic biological automatons capable of real-time movement, self-assembly, and manipulation. These structures were created by repurposing white blood cells from anonymous donors using induced pluripotent stem cell (iPSC) technology, differentiating them into twitching cardiomyocytes, and culturing them on custom three-dimensional silk scaffolds.

Ben-Ary and Nathan Thompson began developing Revivification with composer Alvin Lucier in 2020, after inviting him to collaborate with cellF two years earlier. Lucier donated blood cells for the project before his death in December 2021. While Revivification was still in progress, the collaborators — Ben-Ary, Thompson, Darren Moore, Andrew Fitch, and Stuart Hodgetts — created an interim work, Music for Surrogate Performer, commissioned by the Venice Biennale in 2023. The piece pays tribute to Lucier's 1965 composition Music for Solo Performer, in which Lucier used his own brainwave activity to control a set of percussive instruments. Using induced pluripotent stem cell (iPSC) technology, Lucier's donated cells were reprogrammed into a living neural network grown over a multi-electrode array. In performance, this "surrogate performer" took the place of the human performer, its neural activity read and fed back through custom software to control the same kind of percussive instruments Lucier used in 1965.

Revivification was developed over six years by Ben-Ary, Nathan Thompson, Matt Gingold, and neuroscientist Stuart Hodgetts, growing out of a collaboration with composer Alvin Lucier that began in 2018. Lucier donated blood cells in 2020, before his death in 2021, which the collective transformed into cerebral organoids (mini brainsd), described as Lucier's "surrogate performer." The installation premiered at the Art Gallery of Western Australia in April 2025. At the centre of the work, neural signals from the organoid strike a set of brass plates, and the resulting resonance is captured and fed back to the organoid, forming a continuous feedback loop. The collective frames this through the concept of "in-vitro intelligence" - a speculative proposition that intelligence may emerge from living neural networks grown outside the body, and presents the work as a way of extending Lucier's artistic legacy beyond his death, with the organoid continuing to generate new, unpredictable compositions rather than reconstructing his existing work. In August 2026 revivification was exhibited as part of the Now or Never festival in Melbourne.

== Awards and honors ==
- VIDA International Competition for Art and Artificial Life (2009): First prize for the robotic installation Silent Barrage, co-created with Phil Gamblen and the SymbioticA Research Group.
- Honorary Mention— Prix Ars Electronica, Linz (2017) — cellF
- Honorary Mention — Prix Ars Electronica, Linz (2020) — Bricolage
- Award of Excellence — Japan Media Art Festival, Tokyo (2020) — Bricolage
- Japan Media Arts Festival (2021): Award of Excellence in the Art Division for Bricolage.
- Falling Wall Award (2024): Global winner in the Art & Science category.
