= Radio Quarantine (disambiguation) =

Radio Quarantine may refer to:

- Radio Quarantine Kolkata, an Indian community radio based in Kolkata
- The Radio Quarantine, an Indian community radio based in Bangalore

== See also ==
- Quarantine Radio, a live streaming program hosted by Tory Lanez
