= Makoto Furutani-Seiki =

Japanese molecular biologist

- Other name: Makoto Seiki
- Education: Yamaguchi University, University of Tokyo
- Scientific career
- Fields: Immunology Developmental Genetics Regenerative Medicine Cancer
- Workplaces: Yamaguchi University University of Tokyo Max Planck Institute for Developmental Biology, Germany University of Freiburg, Germany Kumamoto University University of Bath, UK
- Doctoral advisor: Tomio Tada
- Website: https://researchmap.jp/7000021820?lang=en

Makoto Furutani-Seiki is a Japanese molecular biologist who is a professor of Systems Biochemistry in the School of Medicine at Yamaguchi University, Japan.

== Education ==
Furutani-Seiki was educated at the Yamaguchi University School of Medicine, Japan where he was awarded Doctor of Medicine (M.D) in 1985. He completed his postgraduate study at the Department of Immunology, Graduate School of Medicine, University of Tokyo, Japan where he was awarded a Ph.D in Immunology supervised by Tomio Tada in 1989.

== Career and research ==
Furutani-Seiki started his career in 1989, as an assistant professor in Tomio Tada's lab in the Department of Immunology at the University of Tokyo where he investigated the complement factor B for HIV infection. In 1992, he participated in the first large-scale mutagenesis screen for mutations affecting embryonic development as a postdoc in Janni Nusslein-Volhard's lab at Max-Planck-Institute in Tübingen. In 1997, he moved to Freiburg University as a group leader to analyze anterior posterior patterning of zebrafish nervous system and envisaged that a mutagenesis screening in medaka fish could identify new phenotypes that could not be identified in the zebrafish mutant screening. In 2000, he started the first genome-wide mutagenesis screen using medaka fish as a group leader of the Kondoh Differentiation Signalling ERATO project in Kyoto, Japan. A third of the phenotype identified in the Kyoto medaka screening were not seen in the zebrafish Tübingen screening.

In 2007, he moved to University of Bath, UK, Centre for Regenerative Medicine as a Medical Research Council Senior Research Fellow and continues his research at Yamaguchi University School of Medicine, Japan.

Furutani-Seiki research study investigates the molecular mechanisms of mechono-homeostasis in which extracellular mechanical cues are integrated with cell differentiation and proliferation to maintain tissue, organ and body form.

As part of his contribution to the field of Science, Furutani-Seiki discovered a single gene whose product is essential for the body and organs to keep their 3D shape and withstand external forces such as gravity. The gene was discovered through the analysis of a medaka fish mutant with a unique flattened phenotype which was identified by the combination of the mutagenesis screen in zebrafish with another screen in medaka fish. His work further investigates the single cell lineage and regionalisation of cell populations during medaka neurulation.

Furutani-Seiki led an international team of researchers from the University of Bath, UK Centre for Regenerative Medicine that identified a gene that helps the body resist gravity and demonstrated what happens when the system goes wrong. As of June 2018, he held a visiting professorship in Bath's Department of Biology and Biochemistry.

== Awards and honours ==
Furutani-Seiki is an alumnus of Kavli Frontiers of Science and a member of the editorial board of Regenerative Medicine. He's also a Senior Research Fellow UK of the Medical Research Council (MRC). He's also a professional member of the American Association of Cancer Research and the Molecular Biology Society of Japan.

== Selected publications ==
- Haffter, P.; Odenthal, Jörg; Mullins, M. C.; Lin, Shuo; Farrell, Michael J.; Vogelsang, E.; Haas, F.; Brand, M.; van Eeden, Fredericus J. M.; Furutani-Seiki, Makoto; Granato, Michael (1996-11-01). "Mutations affecting pigmentation and shape of the adult zebrafish". Development Genes and Evolution. 206 (4): 260–276. doi:10.1007/s004270050051. ISSN 1432-041X. PMID 24173565. S2CID 31779225.
- Furutani-Seiki, Makoto; Wittbrodt, Joachim (2004-07-01). "Medaka and zebrafish, an evolutionary twin study". Mechanisms of Development. 121 (7): 629–637. doi:10.1016/j.mod.2004.05.010. ISSN 0925-4773. PMID 15210172. S2CID 1798545.
- Seo, Jungwon; Asaoka, Yoichi; Nagai, Yoko; Hirayama, Jun; Yamasaki, Tokiwa; Namae, Misako; Ohata, Shinya; Shimizu, Nao; Negishi, Takahiro; Kitagawa, Daiju; Kondoh, Hisato (2010-07-01). "Negative regulation of wnt11 expression by Jnk signaling during zebrafish gastrulation". Journal of Cellular Biochemistry. 110 (4): 1022–1037. doi:10.1002/jcb.22616. ISSN 1097-4644. PMID 20564202. S2CID 20122079.
- Porazinski, Sean R.; Wang, Huijia; Furutani-Seiki, Makoto (2011). "Essential Techniques for Introducing Medaka to a Zebrafish Laboratory—Towards the Combined Use of Medaka and Zebrafish for Further Genetic Dissection of the Function of the Vertebrate Genome". Vertebrate Embryogenesis. Methods in Molecular Biology. Vol. 770. pp. 211–241. doi:10.1007/978-1-61779-210-6_8. ISBN 978-1-61779-209-0. ISSN 1940-6029. PMID 21805266.
- Miyamoto, Tatsuo; Porazinski, Sean; Wang, Huijia; Borovina, Antonia; Ciruna, Brian; Shimizu, Atsushi; Kajii, Tadashi; Kikuchi, Akira; Furutani-Seiki, Makoto; Matsuura, Shinya (2011-05-15). "Insufficiency of BUBR1, a mitotic spindle checkpoint regulator, causes impaired ciliogenesis in vertebrates". Human Molecular Genetics. 20 (10): 2058–2070. doi:10.1093/hmg/ddr090. ISSN 0964-6906. PMID 21389084.
- Taniguchi, Yoshihito; Takeda, Shunichi; Furutani-Seiki, Makoto; Kamei, Yasuhiro; Todo, Takeshi; Sasado, Takao; Deguchi, Tomonori; Kondoh, Hisato; Mudde, Josine; Yamazoe, Mitsuyoshi; Hidaka, Masayuki (2006-12-08). "Generation of medaka gene knockout models by target-selected mutagenesis". Genome Biology. 7 (12): R116. doi:10.1186/gb-2006-7-12-r116. ISSN 1474-760X. PMC 1794429. PMID 17156454.
- Porazinski, Sean; Wang, Huijia; Asaoka, Yoichi; Behrndt, Martin; Miyamoto, Tatsuo; Morita, Hitoshi; Hata, Shoji; Sasaki, Takashi; Krens, S. F. Gabriel; Osada, Yumi; Asaka, Satoshi (2015-03-16). "YAP is essential for tissue tension to ensure vertebrate 3D body shape". Nature. 521 (7551): 217–221. Bibcode:2015Natur.521..217P. doi:10.1038/nature14215. ISSN 1476-4687. PMC 4720436. PMID 25778702.
- Kitagawa, Takao; Kobayashi, Daiki; Baron, Byron; Okita, Hajime; Miyamoto, Tatsuo; Takai, Rie; Paudel, Durga; Ohta, Tohru; Asaoka, Yoichi; Tokunaga, Masayuki; Nakagawa, Koji; Furutani-Seiki, Makoto; Araki, Norie; Kuramitsu, Yasuhiro; Kobayashi, Masanobu (2022). "AT-hook DNA-binding motif-containing protein one knockdown downregulates EWS-FLI1 transcriptional activity in Ewing's sarcoma cells". PLOS ONE. 17 (10) e0269077. Bibcode:2022PLoSO..1769077K. bioRxiv 10.1101/2022.05.16.492174. doi:10.1371/journal.pone.0269077. PMC 9531837. PMID 36194562.
- Shibata, Kensuke; Shimizu, Takashi; Nakahara, Mashio; Ito, Emi; Legoux, Francois; Fujii, Shotaro; Yamada, Yuka; Furutani-Seiki, Makoto; Lantz, Olivier; Yamasaki, Sho; Watarai, Masahisa (2022-10-01). "The intracellular pathogen Francisella tularensis escapes from adaptive immunity by metabolic adaptation". Life Science Alliance. 5 (10) e202201441. doi:10.26508/lsa.202201441. ISSN 2575-1077. PMC 9170078. PMID 35667686.
