= Patrick Tam (biologist) =

Australian biologist

Patrick Ping Leung Tam (Chinese: 譚秉亮} is an Australian embryologist currently at University of Sydney, the Deputy Director of the Childrens Medical Research institute, the Distinguished Professor and Mok Hing-Yiu Distinguished Visiting Professor at University of Hong Kong.

He is a cited pioneer in his field for studying mouse embryos, cells and biology.

Tam is a member of the editorial board for numerous journals relating to developmental biology; including Developmental Biology, Developmental Cell, Developmental Dynamics, Differentiation and Genesis. He has also served as a guest editor on other publications.

== Awards and fellowships ==
- In 2007 he received the President’s Medal from the Australia and New Zealand Society of Cell and Developmental Biology.
- He is an elected fellow of the Institute of Biology, Australian Academy of Science, Australian Academy of Health and Medical Sciences, Royal Society of Biology and the Royal Society of London (2001).

== Publications ==
- SOX9 directly regulates the type-ll collagen gene, Nature, 1997
- SOX9 binds DNA, activates transcription, and coexpresses with type II collagen during chondrogenesis in the mouse, Elsevier, 1997
- Depletion of definitive gut endoderm in Sox17-null mutant mice, 2002, dev.biologists.org
- Mouse gastrulation: the formation of a mammalian body plan, Elsevier, 1997
- Gene function in mouse embryogenesis: get set for gastrulation, Nature Reviews, 2007
