= Patrick Tam =

Patrick Tam may refer to:

- Patrick Tam (film director) (born 1948), Hong Kong film director
- Patrick Tam (actor) (born 1969), Hong Kong actor and singer
- Patrick Tam (biologist), Australian microbiologist
