= Victimless Leather =

2004 art project

Victimless Leather (2004) is an art piece that represents a leather jacket without killing any animals. It is a prototype of a stitch-less jacket, grown from cell cultures into a layer of tissue supported by a coat shaped polymer layer. "Victimless Leather" was created as a sub-project of the Tissue Culture & Art Project, (also part of SymbioticA) from the University of Western Australia and showcased at the Museum of Modern Art in New York. The artwork, a miniature jacket made from living mouse stem cells in an incubator, was designed to challenge perceptions of life and human responsibility toward manipulated living systems. This artistic grown garment is intended to confront people with the moral implications of wearing parts of dead animals for protective and aesthetic reasons and confronts notions of relationships with manipulated living systems. However, due to rapid cell growth, the exhibit was eventually "killed" by cutting off its nutrients, aligning with the creators' intent to remind viewers of the responsibility towards manipulated life.

== Tissue Culture & Art Project ==
The SymbioticA website explains what it is, "an artistic laboratory dedicated to the research, learning, critique and hands-on engagement with the life sciences.". The artists work with tissue, constructing and growing complex organisms that can live outside the body, making the new objects semi-living. Their projects are meant to question life, identity and the relationship between humans and other living beings and environments. They are also interested in the ethics around partial life and the possibilities around this type of technology in the future.

=== Other projects ===
These are some of the sub-projects that are also part of the TC&A project, in addition to Victimless Leather:

NoArk – NoArk is a collection of cells and tissue from many different organisms, growing together inside a "vessel", a reference to Noah's Ark. The project website states that NoArk is "a tangible as well as symbolic ‘craft’ for observing and understanding a biology that combines the familiar with the other".
Worry Dolls – Seven modern versions of the Guatemalan Worry doll were hand-crafted of degradable polymers and surgical sutures and seeded with skin, muscle and bone tissue. The tissue was then allowed to grow inside a bioreactor, replacing the polymers as it degrades, thus creating seven semi-living dolls.
Disembodied Cuisine – Along with Victimless Leather, this is part of the "Victimless Utopia". The idea for this project was to take cells from a frog and grow them into something possible to eat, displaying it next to the still living frog the food came from. This problematizes the whole meat industry – how we kill animals to eat them. Growing tissue outside of the body of the animal is a way to "make" meat while the animal stays healthy and living.
Extra Ear – ¼ Scale – Using human tissue, a quarter-scale replica of artist Stelarc's ear was grown. The project wanted to confront the cultural perceptions of life now that we are able to manipulate living systems, and also discuss the notions of the wholeness of the body.
The Pig Wings Project – This project bases its ideas on xenotransplantation and genetically modifying pigs so their organs can be transplanted to humans. The artists used tissue engineering and stem cell technologies to grow pig bone tissue, forming three different sets of wings. One set shaped as bat wings ("evil"), one as bird wings ("good") and one as pterosaurs wings ("neutral").

== The Idea ==
An aim for the "Victimless Leather" project is to explore and provoke scientific truths, using conceptual art projects to encourage better understanding of cultural ideas around scientific knowledge. The project website point out how clothing has always been used to protect the fragile skin of humans, but lately have evolved into a fabricated object used as a tool to show one's identity. Based on this, clothing can be explored as a tangible example of the relationship between humans and others, and how humans treat others. As the artists put it: "This particular project will deconstruct our cultural meaning of clothes as a second skin by materialising it and displaying it as an art object."

The intention to grow artificial leather without killing an animal is meant as a contribution to a cultural discussion between art, science and society. Making this jacket presents a possibility of wearing leather that is not part of a dead animal. The projects are presented in Workshops and exhibitions throughout the world to address ethical questions related to bioscience and technology. The artists want the project to be seen in this cultural context, not a commercial one.
Their intention is not to create a consumer product, but to offer a starting point for the cultural discussion points mentioned above. As with most of the TC&A projects the artists are concerned with the relationship between humans and other living systems, both natural and scientific made or manipulated.

== The Victimless Leather project ==
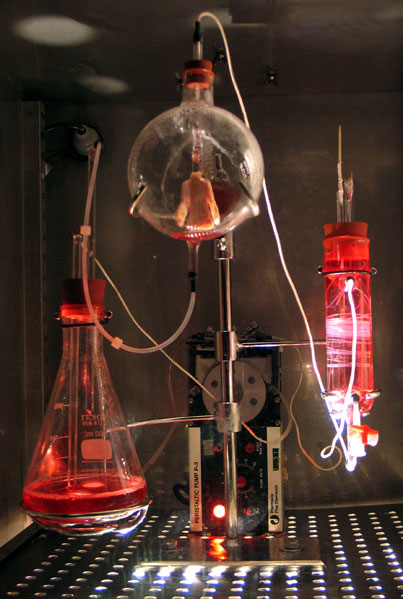
Victimless leather, photo from TC&A webpage

=== Growing the jacket ===
The artists wanted to make a leather-like material using living tissue, and ended up making it in the shape of a stitchless jacket. The artists based the jacket on a biodegradable polymer, coated it with 3T3 mouse cells to form connective tissue and topped it up with human bone cells in order to create a stronger skin layer.

To create the victimless leather, the team needed an artificial environment where semi-living entities are grown, so it is grown inside a bioreactor that acts as a surrogate body. The bioreactor used in this project was custom made, based on an organ perfusion pump designed by Alexis Carrel and Charles Lindbergh. It has an automatic dripping system which feeds the cells. The artists assumed that when the polymer degraded, an integrated jacket would appear. The resulting jacket was tiny, about 2 inches high and 1,4 inches wide and would just fit a mouse.

To idealize the "victimless" of the jacket, immortalized cell lines or cells that divide and multiply forever once they are removed from an animal or human host forming a renewable resource, have been used in the project. The 3T3 mouse cells all come from a mouse who lived in the 1970s.

== Research and development ==
The research and development of “Victimless Leather” has been conducted in SymbioticA: the Art and Science Collaborative Research Laboratory, School of Anatomy and Human Biology at the University of Western Australia and in consultation with Professor Arunasalam Dharmarajan from the School of Anatomy and Human Biology as well as Verigen, a Perth-based company that specializes in tissue engineered cartilage for clinical applications. Western Australia state made the investment in the project through ArtsWa in Association with the Lotteries Commission.

=== Exhibitions ===
Year	Location	Venue	About
2013	Sydney, Australia	Powerhouse Museum	Victimless Leather as part of the exhibition "Semipermeable (+)".
2010	Tokyo, Japan	Mori Museum	Victimless Leather as part of the exhibition "Medicine and Art: Imagining a Future for Life and Love".
2009	Luxemburg		Victimless Leather. Part of the exhibition "Sk-interface".
2008	Buffalo, USA	CEPA Gallery	NoArk II and Victimless Leather.
2008	The Netherlands	The National Glass Museum	Victimless Leather. Part of the exhibition "SkinDeep".
2008	Dublin, Ireland	Science Gallery	Victimless Leather. Part of the exhibition "TechnoThreads".
2008	Liverpool, UK		Victimless Leather. Part of the exhibition "Sk-interface".
2008	New York, USA	MoMA	Victimless Leather. Part of the exhibition “Design and the Elastic Mind”
2007	UK	Tyne & Wear Museum	Victimless Leather. Part of the exhibition "Our Cyborg Future?".
2006	Toronto, Canada	Ontario Science Centre	Victimless Leather.
2004	Perth, Australia	John Curtin Gallery	Victimless Leather. Part of the exhibition "The Space Between".

From a list of selected TC&A exhibitions.

==== Killing the Jacket ====
The victimless leather was featured in the exhibition “Design and the Elastic Mind” at The Museum of Modern Art in New York City, United States. February 24 – May 12, 2008 The project was scheduled to grow continuously until May 12 when the exhibition ended. There were some problems though, when the leather started expanding too quickly, clogging tubes inside the bioreactor. The exhibition leader therefore decided to unplug the project before the end of the exhibition – in a way, killing it.

=== Response ===
Because the artificial leather is made semi-living, the project might be seen as speculative and provocative to some people – questioning whether it is better to kill semi-living beings rather than living beings. "One of the most common and somewhat surprising comments we heard was that people were disturbed by our ethics of using living cells to grow living fabric, while the use of leather obtained from animals seems to be accepted without any concern for the well-being of the animals from which the skin has been removed." artist Ionat Zurr uttered after showing the jacket to the public on "The Space Between" exhibition in Australia.

== Artists ==
=== Oron Catts ===
Oron Catts was born in Helsinki, Finland in 1967, and is currently residing in Perth, Australia where he has been employed at the University of Western Australia since 1996. He works as an artistic director of SymbioticA, which he is also co-founder of. He is founder of the Tissue Culture & Art Project. From 2000–2001 he was a Research Fellow at the Tissue Engineering and Organ Fabrication Laboratory at Harvard Medical School. He has also worked with numerous other bio-medical laboratories in several different countries.

=== Ionat Zurr ===
Ionat Zurr was born in London, UK in 1970, and is currently residing in Perth, Australia. Since 1996 she has been employed at the University of Western Australia, where she also did her PhD titled "Growing Semi-Living Art" under the Faculty of Architecture, Landscape and Visual Arts . Zurr specialises in video production and biological and digital imaging. She works as an assistant professor and academic coordinator at SymbioticA and is co-founder of the Tissue Culture & Art Project. From 2000–2001 she was a research fellow at the Tissue Engineering and Organ Fabrication Laboratory at Harvard Medical School.

== Related work and ideas ==
The project also focuses on human consumption, highlighting that there are victims on every level of it, and that the boundaries between harm and benefit often are blurred. The French actress Brigitte Bardot strongly opposed hunting of animals for vanity and the commercial purpose of the skin. From an indigenous point of view, the context must be seen different. An Inuk hunts the seal and uses the whole body of the animal as a basic resource for his survival.

Similar to ethics like this, is the interest for artificial meat production due to reactions against the livestock sector because of health and environmental problems. A 2006 UN Food and Agriculture Organization FAO report pointed out the livestock sector as one of the most significant contributors to the most serious environmental problems like soil degradation and water pollution. And because of methane, it spews out more greenhouse gases into the atmosphere than transportation.

== See also ==
- SymbioticA
- BioArt
- In vitro meat
- Life sciences
- Cell biology
- PETA
