= Cinti =

Cinti may refer to:

Places

- Cincinnati, Ohio, United States
- Cinti, Bolivia:
  - Nor Cinti Province
  - Sud Cinti Province
  - Cinti Valley

People

- Laura Cinti, artist working with biology
- Laure Cinti-Damoreau (1801–- 25 February 1863), French opera singer
- Lucio Cinti (born 2000), Argentine rugby union player

== Similar spellings ==
- Cinta
- Cintia
