= Amy Karle =

American artist (born 1980)

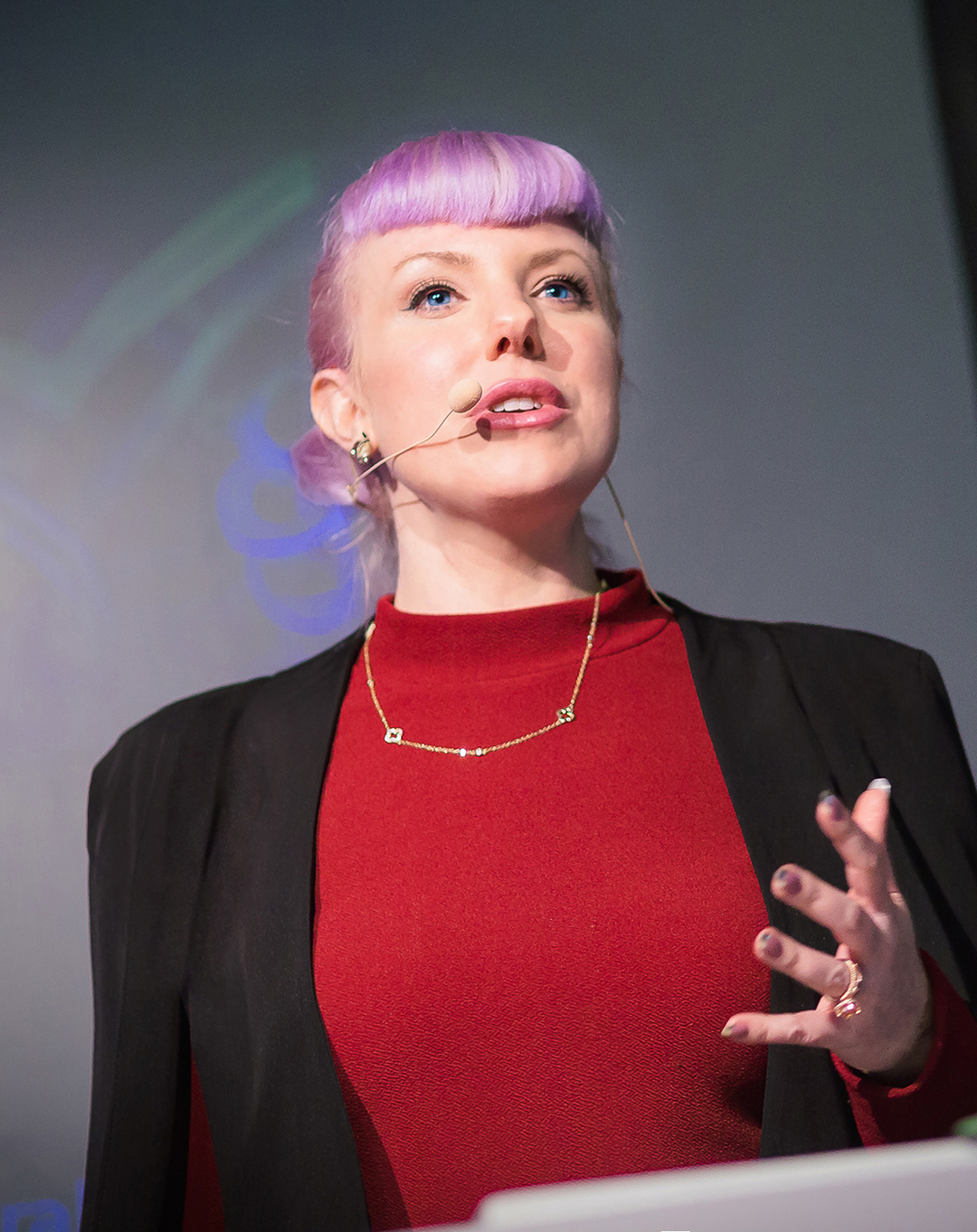
- Amy Karle in 2019
- Born: 1980 (age 45–46); New York, U.S.
- Notable work: Regenerative Reliquary, Internal Collection, Heart of Evolution?, Biofeedback, Cyborg Couture
- Movement: Ultra-contemporary art, contemporary art, conceptual art, new media art, bioart, hybrid arts, digital art, computational art, performance art
- Website: www.amykarle.com

Amy Karle (born 1980) is an American artist, bioartist, and futurist whose work focuses on the relationship between technology and humanity, specifically how technology and biotechnology impact health, humanity, society, evolution, and the future. Karle combines science and technology with art and is known for using living tissue in her work.

In 2018, Karle was an Artist Diplomat sponsored by the U.S. Department of State, for a cultural exchange initiative in conjunction with the Copernicus Science Center in Poland where she led workshops focusing on women's empowerment in STEAM fields. In 2019, she was named one of the BBC's 100 women.

== Personal life ==
Karle was born in New York in 1980 and grew up in Endicott, outside the upstate city of Binghamton. Her mother was a biochemist and her father was a pharmacist and Karle has said she "grew up in the lab and in the pharmacy". Karle is an alumnus of the School of Art and Design at Alfred University and Cornell University where she received degrees in Art and Design and Philosophy.

Karle was born with a rare condition, aplasia cutis congenita, missing a large region of skin on her scalp and also missing bone in her skull. She underwent a series of experimental surgical procedures as a child. The skin was repaired by tissue expansion surgery that was considered dangerous and experimental at the time that it was performed. This experience impacted her work and desire to heal and enhance the human body and human condition. This early experience also inspired her interest in the links between biology, medical futuring and art.

== Work ==
Karle researches and explores the impact of technology on bodily enhancement through her artwork. Her work is often classified as bioart; she describes her intentions for this work:

My relationship with health and the future perspective of medicine reflects the story of my life, intertwined with medical challenges and the discovery of vulnerability, fragility, strength, and complexity of the human body. The narrative of illness, with all its fears, hopes, and the quest for healing, constitutes a common thread in my research and work."

Karle has created a number of artworks and performances using biofeedback and neurofeedback including: A work from 2011, Biofeedback Art, was a durational performance where Karle's body was connected to a Sandin Image Processor that detected the changes that occur while she meditated over periods of 5–8 hours. Video art was created in the form of projections during the process. In the same year, Resonation involved an EEG neuroheadset connected to a Chladni plate to generate bio-signals into visuals and sounds. Her 2018 Performance in Salt Mine was conducted in the Bochnia Salt Mine and Wieliczka Salt Mine using an EEG neuroheadset to translate her brainwaves into digital music and projected visualizations, which were later used in a planetarium film she made.

Karle was named as one of the BBC's 100 women in 2019.

=== Selected works ===
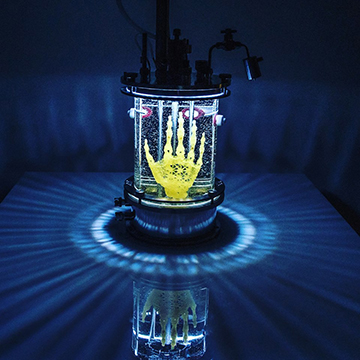
Regenerative Reliquary (2016), a BioArt sculpture of a hand-shaped scaffold for cell culture

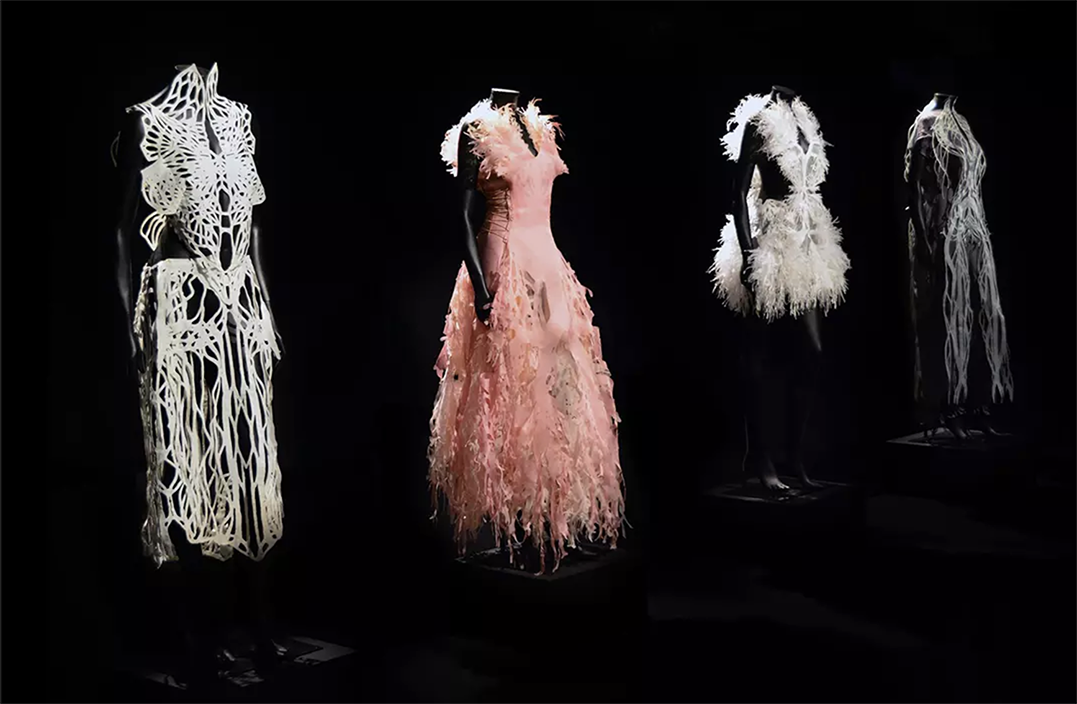
Internal Collection (2016–17) sculptural garments based on human anatomy

Regenerative Reliquary (2016) is a sculpture that features a 3D-printed bioprinted hydrogel scaffold shaped like the bones of a human hand placed inside a glass vessel. Human Mesenchymal stem cells from a living donor were placed on the scaffold which over time grew into bone. It has been exhibited internationally.

Internal Collection (2016–2017) is a series of garments based on human anatomy. The fabrication consists of 3D body scanning, computer-aided design, laser cutting, and hand-sewing techniques to create representations of internal body systems.

The Body and Technology: A Conversational Metamorphosis (2017) is a collection of 2D artworks by Amy Karle made by hand and with artificial neural networking, machine learning, and artificial intelligence. In this body of work, Karle coupled artificial intelligence in healthcare with generative design to devise a system for leveraging AI in the diagnosis of disease, with generative CAD designing replacement parts, and 3D bioprinting to create implants.

Morphologies of Resurrection (2020) is a series of 6 sculptures created as part of a Smithsonian residency, and exhibited at the Smithsonian Institution. Karle's process examined the possibilities of reconstructive technologies and future evolution through biotechnological advancements. The artworks are novel evolutionary forms based upon extinct species to explore “hypothetical evolutions through technological regeneration”, 3D printed in biocompatible material.

=== Artificial intelligence ===
Her AI and bio-AI hybrid artworks have been in museum exhibitions including: Artificial Intelligence: AI / The Other I Ars Electronica Linz, Austria, La Fabrique Du Vivant Centre Pompidou, Paris, France, and Future and the Arts: How Humanity Will Live Tomorrow Mori Art Museum, Tokyo, Japan.
