= The Radio Quarantine =

Indian radio

The Radio Quarantine was a Bangalore-based internet community radio launched on 26 March 2020 operated by a network of independent composers and musical instrument makers.

== History ==
The Radio Quarantine was launched in the city of Bangalore, Karnataka on 26 March 2020, a day after the launch of Radio Quarantine Kolkata and was operated by a network of independent composers and musical instrument makers called the Indian Sonic Research Organisation. It went live every night from 9 p.m.. Its programs were primarily run by the musician Yashas Shetty, one of the members of the network. The radio was hosted on the website radio.artscienceblr.org and operated out of Shetty's residence in Benson Town, Bangalore. Within the first 21 days, the station had attracted a significant audience of listeners both locally and internationally.

The station broadcast music on episodes with specific lockdown related themes such as Isolation, Taking a Break, Dancing on Your Own, etc and hosted discussion shows about ongoing political and social issues in India. The songs featured on the station including a wide rage of genres and time periods, and were compared with those on Radio Quarantine Kolkata in terms of their eclecticism. The genres included both eastern and western classical compositions, contemporary Japanese musicians and Hindi and English pop from the 1980s. The station also accepted song requests and listeners were encouraged to make submissions.

The political ecologist Savita Vijayakumar had collaborated with the station and arranged invitations for a number of guest speakers on its discussion shows, which were hosted by Shetty. The shows have featured discussions on the dangers posed by science with the cosmologist Martin Rees, on the crisis faced by migrants and other workers in midst of the pandemic with the activist and unionist Kavita Krishnan, and on various other topics with individuals such as the sound engineer Umashankar Mantravadi and writer Arshia Sattar, among others.
