= William Myers (design writer) =

William Myers is an American design historian and curator based in Amsterdam. He is the author of Bio Design: Nature + Science + Creativity (2012, second edition 2018), a book exploring design that is made with, for, or about biology. It is published by the Museum of Modern Art (MoMA) in New York and Thames & Hudson. Myers is also the author of Bioart: Altered Realities (2015) that is published by Thames & Hudson and BNN in Japan. His exhibitions include Biodesign at the Rhode Island School of Design (RISD), Matter of Life at the MU Gallery in Eindhoven and Biodesign at the New Institute in Rotterdam. He also led the curatorial teams for the exhibitions Humans Need Not Apply and Unreal at the Science Galleries in Dublin and Rotterdam, respectively. Myers is the jury chairman of the Bio Art and Design Award, formerly the Designers & Artists 4 Genomics Award.

Myers is the lead organizer of the Museum of 21st Century Design based in Amsterdam, the Netherlands. The museum is a non-profit organization (Cultural ANBI Stichting) that enhances public understanding of design with positive social and environmental impacts. The museum doesn't have a permanent building; it's a compilation of temporary exhibitions and events in different locations, publications, and an online collection. In 2020, the museum won the first Creative States Prize.

== Publications ==
- William Myers, Bio Design: Nature + Science + Creativity, Museum of Modern Art, 2012, new edition 2018. ISBN 978-0500294390
- William Myers, Bio Art: Altered Realities, Thames & Hudson, 2015. ISBN 978-0500239322
