= Hackteria =

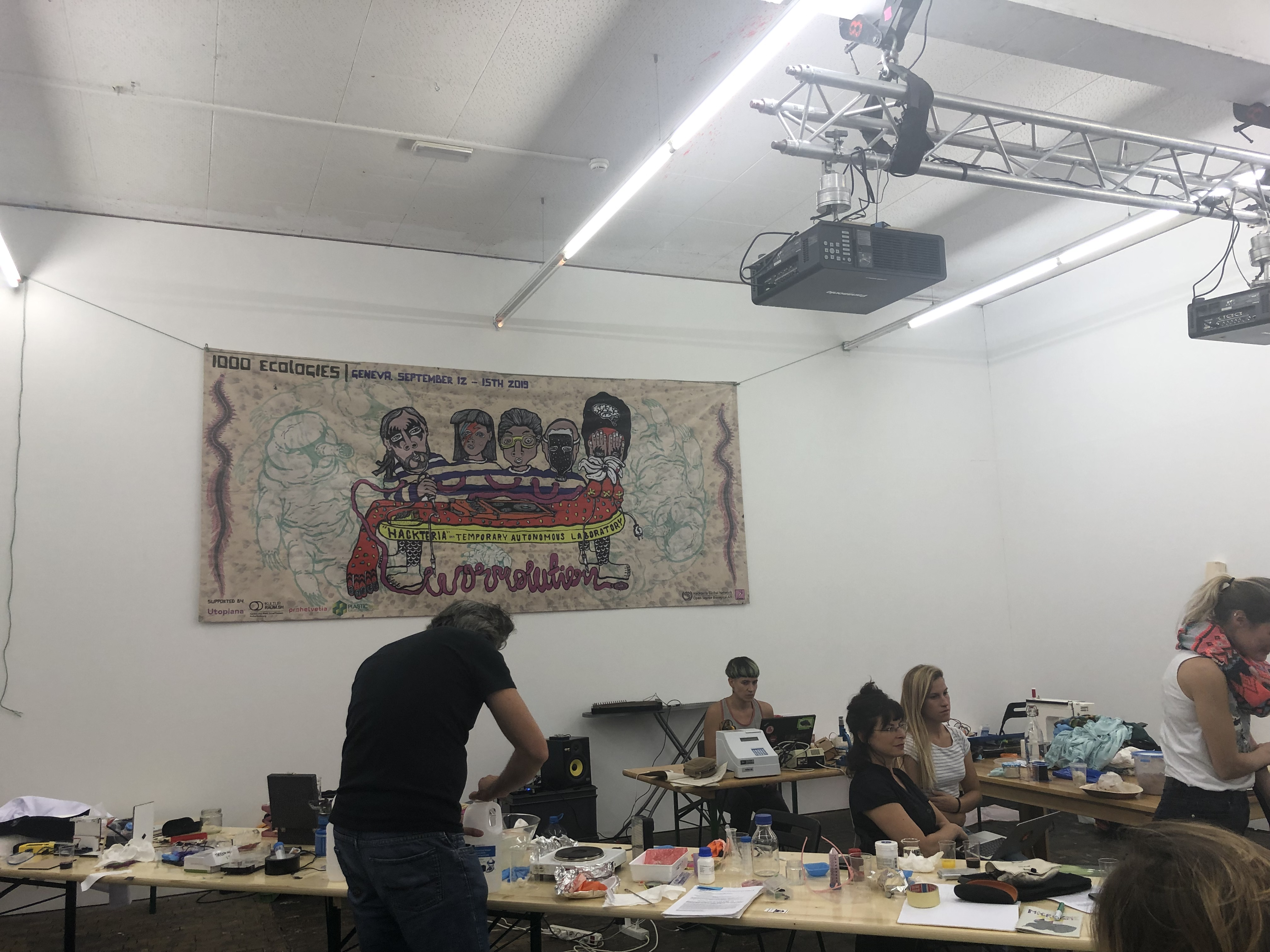
Hackteria, Wormolution at the centre de la photo in Genèva, septembre,12 2019

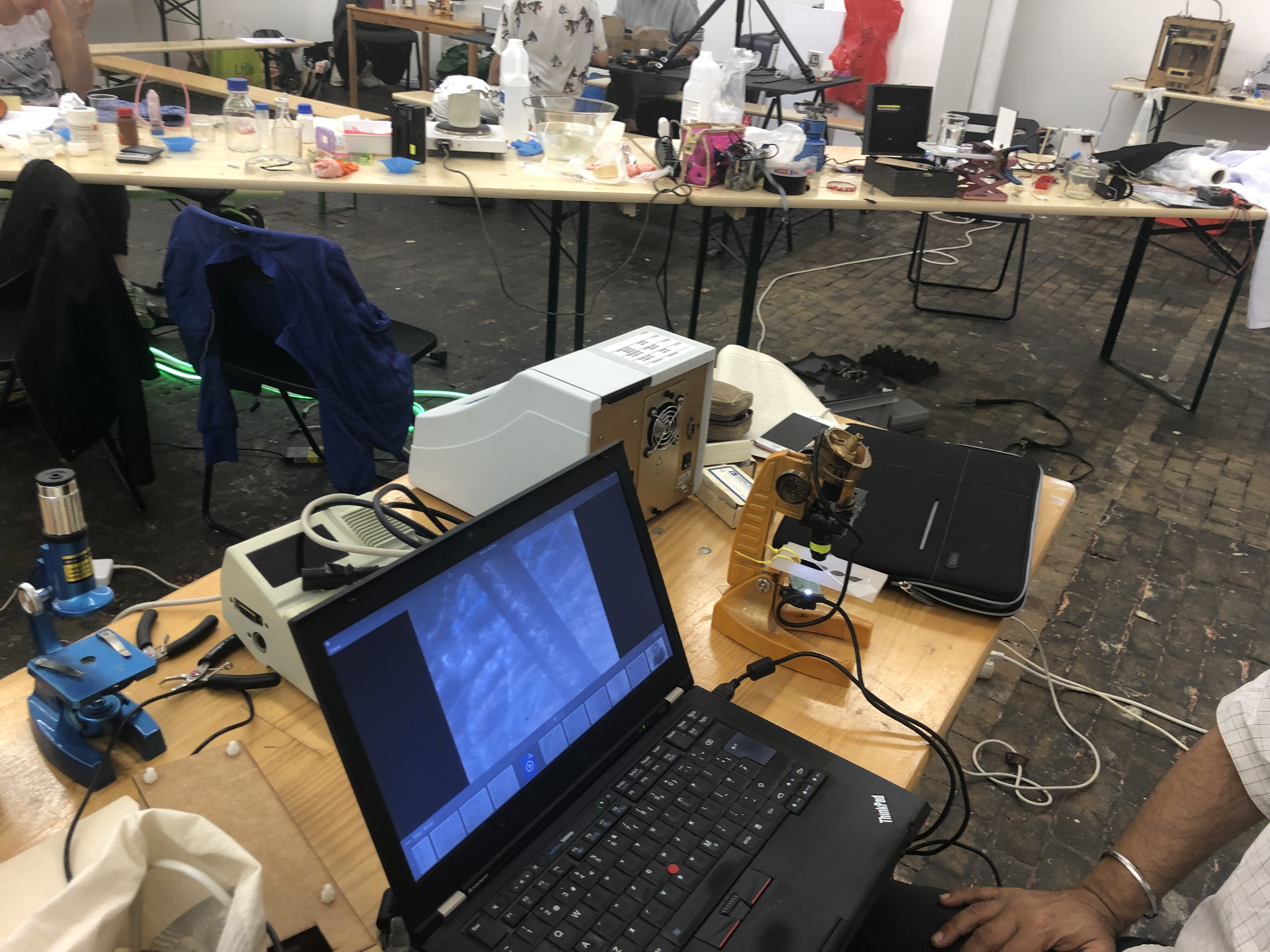
Hackteria in Geneva, 2019

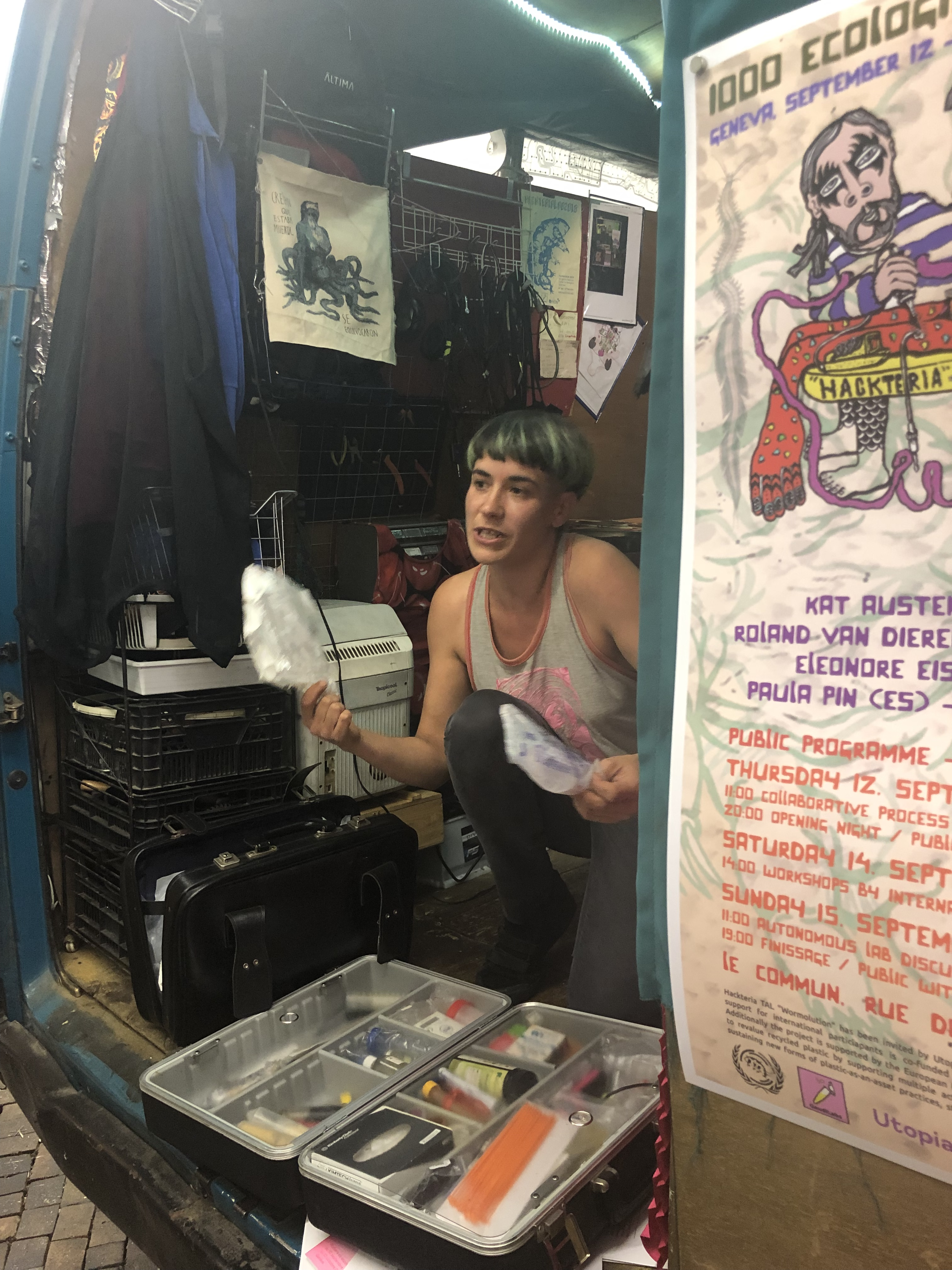
Hackteria in Geneva, 2019

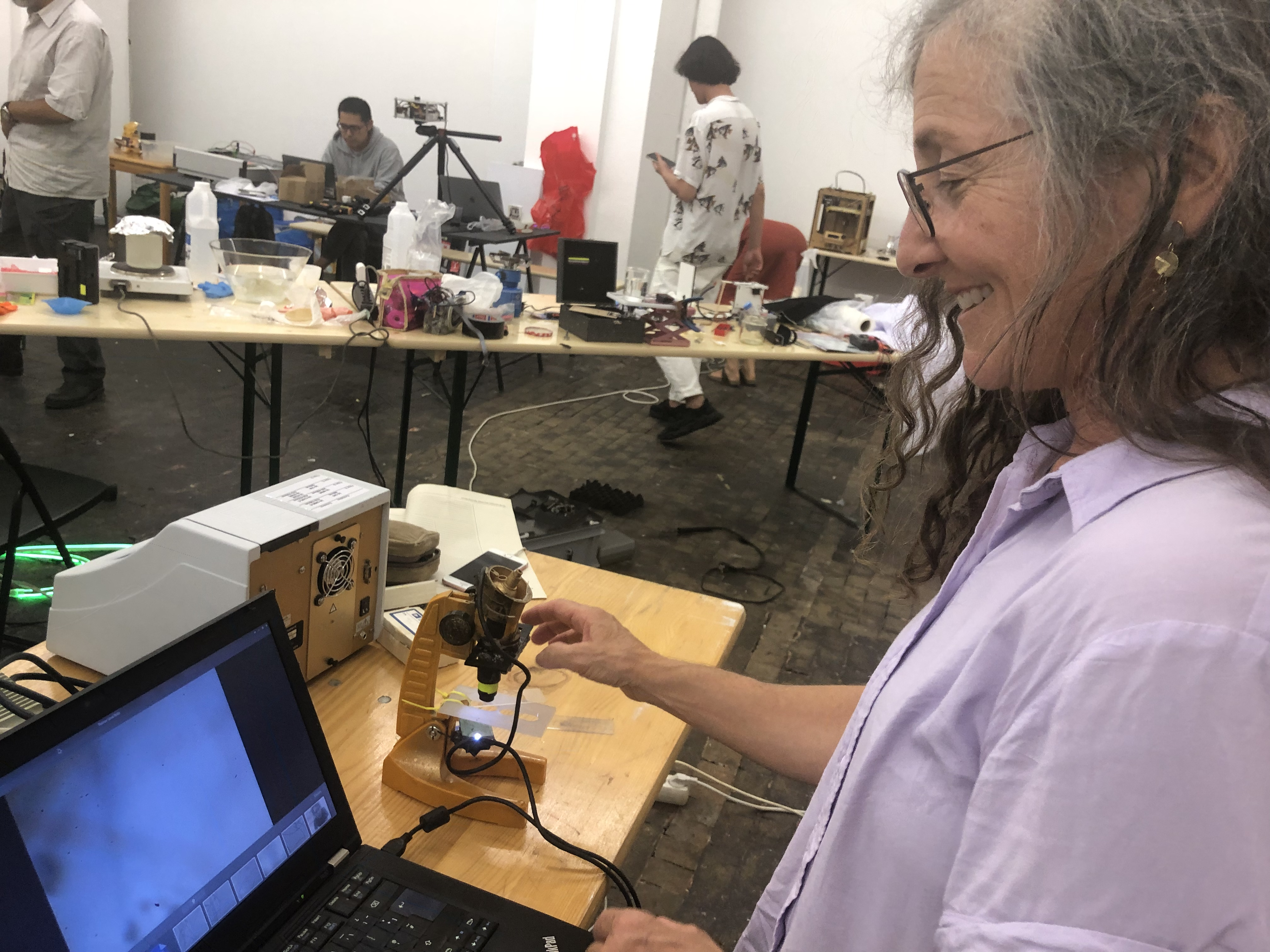
Hackteria in Geneva, 2019

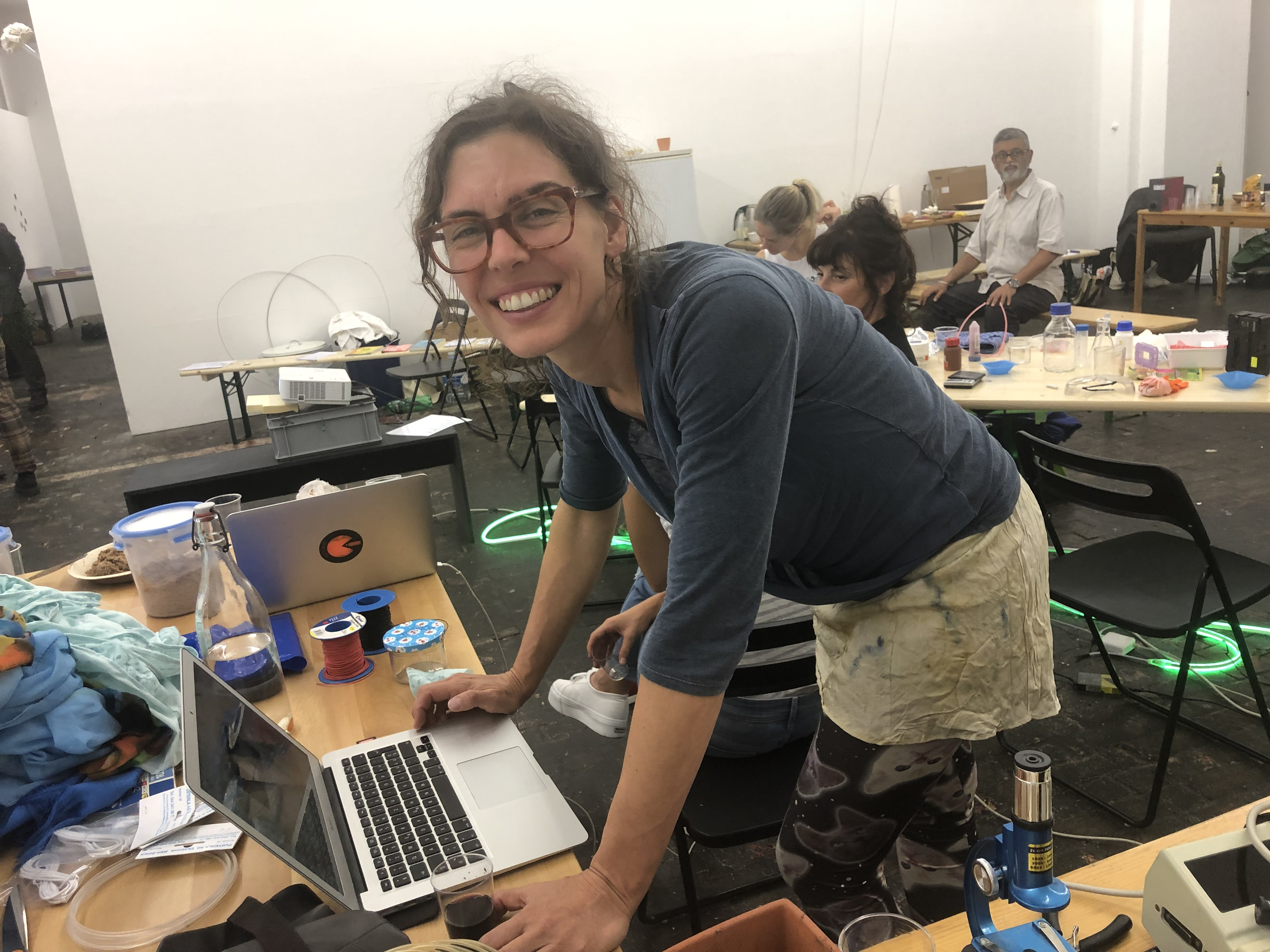
Hackteria in Geneva, 2019

Hackteria is a web platform and collection on their wiki pages of open source biological art projects instigated in February 2009 by Andy Gracie, Marc Dusseiller and Yashas Shetty, after collaboration during the Interactivos?09 Garage Science at Medialab Prado in Madrid. According to their website the aim of the project is to develop a rich wiki-based web resource for people interested in or developing projects that involve bioart, open source software/open source hardware, DIY biology, art/science collaborations and electronic experimentation.

Hackteria designs were featured in the book Open-Source Lab by Joshua M. Pearce. SciDev reports that Hackteria is trying to change the way development is done with DIY. Wired highlighted a project inspired by Hackteria's earlier prototypes on mobile labs to create the Darwin Toolbox: the portable DIY biotechnology lab-in-a-box, now developed further as the Bento Lab. In India, Hackteria is known for the science of art making. The global Hackteria network has also been pioneering and cofounding the recent global movement on open science hardware, HardwareX, and contributed to the founding of GOSH - Gathering for Open Science Hardware, held the first time at CERN in Geneva in 2016.

== See also ==
- Do-it-yourself biology
