= Jalila Essaïdi =

Dutch artist and inventor (born 1980)

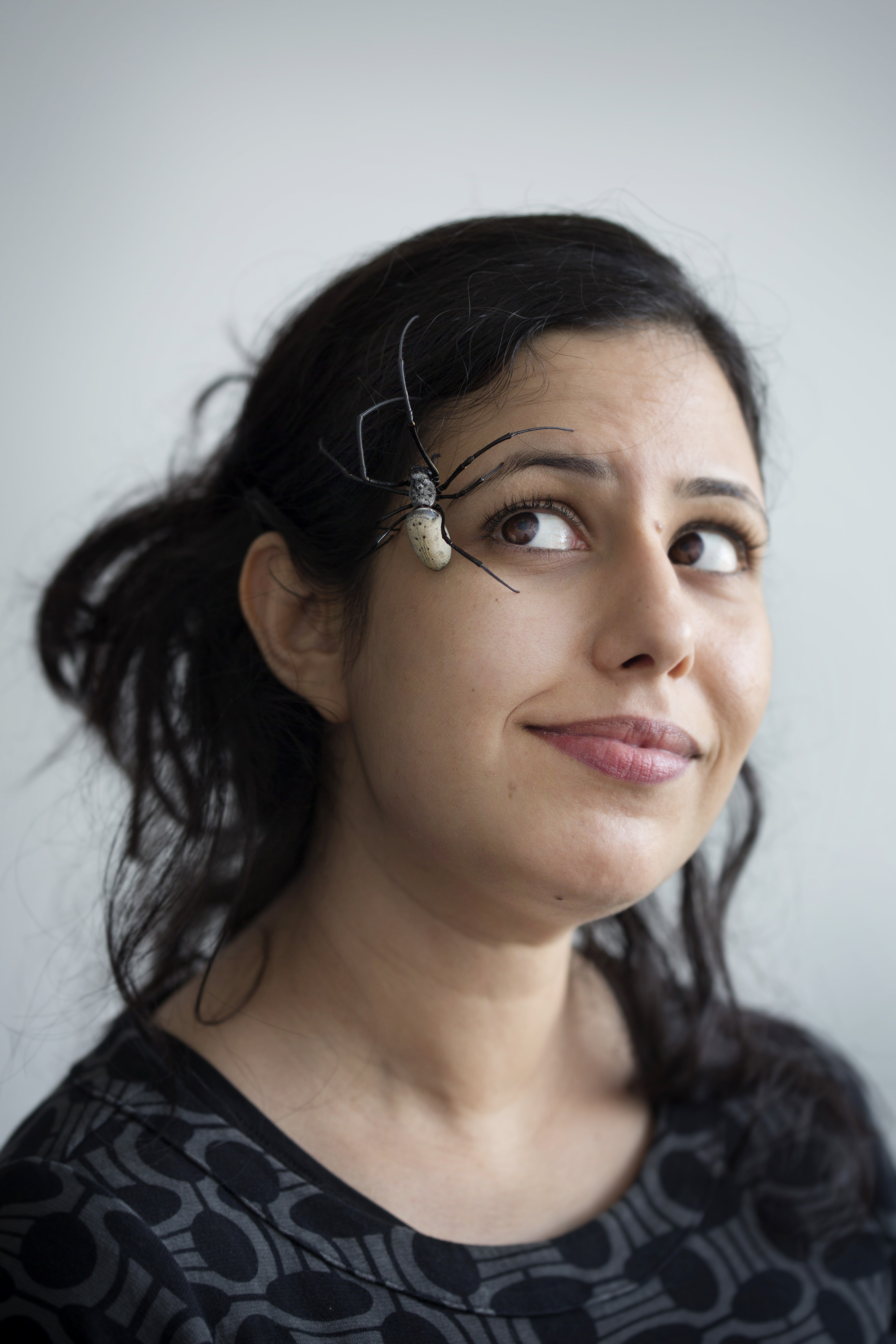
- Born: October 29, 1980 (age 46)
- Occupations: Artist, inventor, entrepreneur
- Notable work: Bulleproof skin (2011); A simple line (2014); Mestic (2015)
- Style: Bio-art
- Awards: Global Change Award, 2017; Chivas The Venture, 2018
- Website: http://jalilaessaidi.com/

Jalila Essaïdi (born 1980) is a Dutch artist, inventor and entrepreneur based in Eindhoven, Netherlands. Essaïdi is specialised in the fields of modern biotechnology and biological arts (bio-art), and an entrepreneur in the field of sustainability with a background in business management and expertise in cross-sectoral collaborations. She is also founder and director of the non-profit BioArt Laboratories, and the for-profit Inspidere BV.

== Early life ==
Essaïdi obtained her bachelor's degree at the Fontys Hogeschool voor de Kunsten in Tilburg in 2009. She studied bio-art at Leiden University from 2008 to 2010, after which she also did her master's degree in Art Education at the Fontys Zuyd Alliance from 2010 to 2011. After her master's degree, she followed Business Development at the KTH Royal Institute of Technology in 2017 and Social Entrepreneurship at the Saïd Business School / University of Oxford and Skoll Center for Social Entrepreneurship in 2018.

== Major works ==
=== Bulletproof skin ===
Essaidi is best known for her work '2.6g 329 m/s', also known as 'Bulletproof Skin' (2011), a project to achieve bioengineered bulletproof human skin. This project combined in vitro human skin with spider silk from genetically modified organisms such as goats and silkworms to create a material that stops a slow-speed bullet, yet is pierced by one fired at normal speed. The impact of this international collaborative project was coined as a prime example of international cooperation by the Dutch Ministry of Economic Affairs.

=== A simple line ===
With 'A simple line' (2014), Essaïdi attempts to merge the abstract idea of a line with its most tangible reality by having a zebra finch look at its own in vitro brain cells in the form of a line. A line made of specific cells (simple cells) which give rise to the abstract concept of lines and our perception of them.

'A simple line' is a work about perception and the thin line between reality and abstraction. The project focuses on our neurological functioning and evokes the history of Piet Mondrian. In De Stijl, Mondrian was exploring a reduction of figures that decomposed nature and reduced it to its primal forms and colours. 'A simple line' pushes the perceptual purity even further by (...) merging the abstract idea of a line with the most tangible reality.

=== Mestic ===
Another well-known project is 'Mestic' (2015), a novel and economically viable method for producing regenerated cellulose fibres derived from a waste stream: cow manure. A breakthrough innovation that is fundamentally ahead with regards to sustainable practices of cellulose sources for fashion. Two of the most polluting industries in the world are being radically transformed with this one single idea: Turning an acute agricultural problem of waste into a new sustainable source of raw materials for the textile industry. Avoiding major environmental catastrophes, giving rise to a local circular economy with cow manure, therefore allowing the agricultural sector to adhere to (inter)national policies while still making it possible for them to keep their investment (cows) and grow.

'Mestic' is a work about overriding our natural aversion to waste. In nature, nothing is considered waste. Yet manure, in its essence, is easily considered the vilest substance we know. 'Mestic' shows that even this most disgusting matter is inherently beautiful.

== Career ==
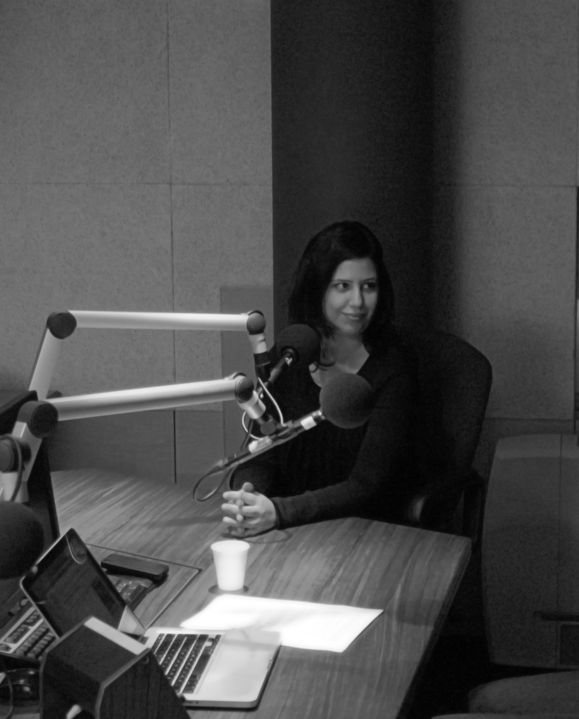
Essaïdi’s projects have been covered by Associated Press, Reuters, CNN and the BBC, among numerous others.

Essaïdi excels in particular in the field of inspiration. She reaches a diverse audience through her many media interviews and publications, her worldwide audience for lectures, and her presence in the world's largest Museums. Recent exhibitions include: Victory and Albert Museum, London; State Tretyakov Gallery, Moscow; World Expo 2017, Nur-Sultan; Power station of Art, Shanghai.

Essaïdi's projects have been covered by Associated Press, Reuters, CNN and the BBC, among numerous others. It is when she founded her startup Inspidere BV (2015) to capitalise on this research that she was invited to Startup Fest Europe to pitch among world-class speakers such as Eric Schmidt (CEO Alphabet/Google), Tim Cook (CEO Apple) and Travis Kalanick (CEO Uber). More recent significant keynote lectures include the Biodiversity Next Conference 2019, and the Creativity World Forum 2019.

Essaïdi resides in the Eindhoven region. She was voted first place for 'Regional Top Woman' in 2017. Essaïdi's impact was also recognised in Europe, in 2019 Essaïdi was finalist for the EU Prize for Women Innovators, by the European Commission

=== Inspidere ===
Inspidere is a for-profit biotech company, based in Eindhoven. With Inspidere Essaïdi set out to develop her patented multiple award-winning innovations such as methods for creating high performance fabrics and composite materials reinforced with spider silk obtained from genetically modified goats, and her method for producing manure-derived paper; bioplastics; and regenerated cellulose fibres.

The successful development of Mestic was recognised in 2017 by the textile industry and Jalila Essaïdi was awarded with the Global Change Award. This is a prestigious award offered by the H&M Foundation, that came with 150.000-euro prize money and the support of H&M Foundation, H&M, Accenture and KTH Royal Institute of Technology in Stockholm.

Through this award, Essaïdi participated in an incubator by KTH Royal Institute of Technology in Stockholm. Through both the H&M foundation and Accenture Essaïdi developed direct contact with all major retail players in this industry and visited manufacturing plants in Shanghai. The opportunity (through H&M) to talk with anyone in the apparel industry and ask them any questions was vital since this industry is a really closed industry with limited access. Finally, the expertise of Accenture dealing with global projects, extended across multiple industries was key to the successful implementation of a truly sustainable version of Mestic.

Mestic has shown unprecedented emission reductions, reducing significant GWP in both the agricultural sector and the textile industry. A single t-shirt produced through this method reduces emissions by 1 kg of CO_{2} equivalents. Based on these results, and the power to change current practices, Essaïdi won in 2018 the Clim@ competition, an award organised by the Green for Growth Fund, initiated by the European Investment Bank. Through this award Essaïdi gained full support for obtaining future financing.

In addition to the environmental impact, Mestic focusses beyond revenue and profit, which won Essaïdi in 2018 the Chivas Venture. This is a prestigious award for social entrepreneurship offered by Chivas Regal, that came with 200.000-dollar prize money and the support of Saïd Business School and the Skoll Centre for Social Entrepreneurship.

=== BioArt Laboratories Foundation ===
Essaïdi does not just inspire other women to become innovators/leaders in innovation, but through her non-profit foundation BioArt Laboratories she actively scouts worldwide for young top- talents in (bio)tech, art and design. The foundation provides them with professional guidance in development and intellectual property; a 2000 m^{2} laboratory; and a rapid prototyping facility to make their ideas more tangible.

The core idea behind the foundation is: innovation for innovation is meaningless. The creative industry offers unique tools to make innovation socially relevant.

Starting 2020 the BioArt Laboratories Foundation is the National Development Institute for the Biological Arts, part of the basic cultural infrastructure directly funded by the Dutch Government. The foundation collaborates among others with NWO (Netherlands Organisation for Scientific Research, The Hague) and ZonMW (Medical Research Council, The Hague) and combines top-talents with top Dutch research groups in the life sciences through the Bio Art & Design Awards to collaborate on art and innovation.

Through the foundation, Essaïdi has a direct impact on the innovation ecosystem and provides startup-accelerators, research groups and individuals with ideas and talents that can stand on their own.

== Honours and awards ==
- EU Prize for Women Innovators, by the European Commission, 2019 (finalist)
- High Tech Piek Award, by Innovation Origins, 2019
- Inspiring Fifty Netherlands, by Inspiring Fifty, 2019
- Katerva Award, by Katerva, 2018 (finalist)
- Clim@ competition, by Green for Growth Fund and the European Investment Bank, 2018
- The Chivas Venture, by Chivas Regal, 2018
- WDCD Climate Challenge, by What Design Can Do, 2018
- Regional Top Woman, by Frits Magazine, 2017
- Global Change Award, by H&M Foundation, 2017
- TheNextWomen Competition, by TheNextWomen, 2017 (finalist)
- Postcode Lotteries Green Challenge, by the Nationale Postcode Loterij, 2017 (finalist)
- Accenture Innovation Awards, by Accenture, 2017 (finalist)
- Future Textiles Award, 2017 (finalist)
- Inspiring Fifty Netherlands, by Inspiring Fifty, 2017
- ASN Bank Wereldprijs, by ASN Bank, 2016 (finalist)
- High Potential Talent, by BKKC, 2013
- Prix Ars Electronica - by Ars Electronica, 2012
