= Christine L. Mummery =

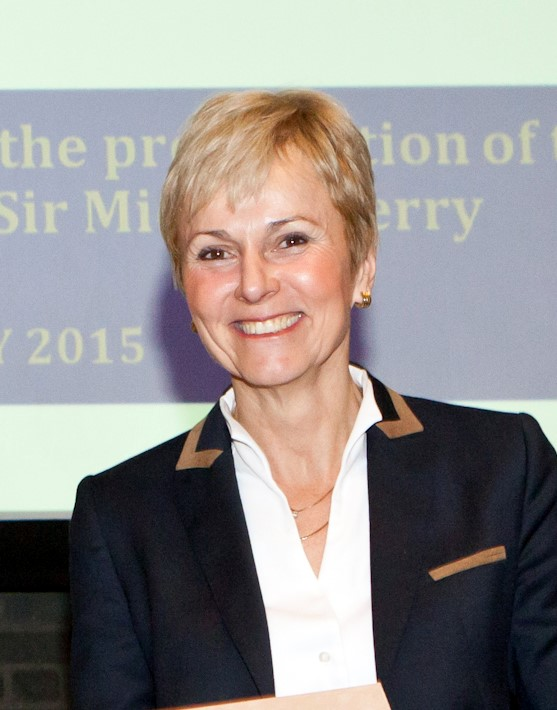
- Mummery (2015)
- Born: March 29, 1953 (age 73); London
- Education: University of Nottingham (BS); University of London (PhD)
- Scientific career
- Fields: Developmental biology
- Website: Leiden University

Christine L. Mummery (born March 29, 1953) is an appointed professor of Developmental Biology at Leiden University and the head of the Department of Anatomy and Embryology at Leiden University Medical Center in the Netherlands.

Prof. Mummery has pioneered studies on cardiomyocytes from human embryonic stem cells (hPSC) and was among the first to inject them in mouse heart after myocardial infarction. Mummery was the first to derive human-induced pluripotent stem cells (hiPSC) in Netherlands and is leading in their use for cardiovascular disease modelling and safety pharmacology. In 2010, she established the LUMC hiPSC core facility.

== Early education and career ==
Mummery obtained a Bachelor of Science degree in Physics, Electronics and Mathematics in 1974 from the University of Nottingham, UK. Prof. Mummery completed her Ph.D. in Biophysics from the University of London, UK for researching the effect of ultrasound in wound healing at King's College London in 1978.

== Research and career ==
From 1978 to 1980, Mummery worked as a Postdoctoral fellow at the Royal Society, UK working on "Ion transport, differentiation and the cell cycle in neuroblastoma cells”. In 1981, she continued with a Postdoctoral fellowship at the Hubrecht Institute (KNAW), Utrecht, working on neuroblastoma and embryonal carcinoma cells as screens for teratogens before being appointed tenured staff scientist working on developmental biology, differentiation and stem cells in 1985. In 1993, Prof. Mummery became a group leader working on TGFβ and BMP signalling in mouse development using cardiomyogenesis and vasculogenesis in mouse and human (embryonic) stem cells as models. In 2007, Mummery was a visiting professor jointly at the Harvard Stem Cell Institute (HSCI) and the Radcliffe Institute working on to engineer cardiac grafts.

Prior to her position as Chair of the Department of Anatomy and Embryology at Leiden University Medical Center, Prof. Mummery was a professor of Developmental Biology at the Faculty of Medicine, University of Utrecht from 2002 to 2008.

Since 2015, Mummery is a Professor of Vascular Modelling at the Technical University of Twente to develop organ-on-chip models.

Prof. Mummery is also the co-founder of LUMC spinout Pluriomics bv (now Ncardia since September 2017)

Mummery is a board member of the Hubrecht Institute (KNAW), the Netherlands Organisation for Scientific Research and the International Society of Stem Cell research (ISSCR) from which she is vice president since 2018 until 2020.

Mummery is also the founding editor of Stem Cell Reports; is on the editorial Board of Cell Stem Cells, Stem Cells, Current Stem Cell Res. and Therapy, Cardiovascular Research, Molecular Therapy & Differentiation. She is in the Scientific Advisory Boards of EU IMI StemBANCC, Galapagos, Pluripotent Stem Cell Initiative (UK).

== Awards and honours ==
- ISSCR Public Service Award 2023
- Elected member Academia Europaea (2015)
- Hans Bloemendaal Medal 2014 for innovative interdisciplinary research
- Hugo van de Poelgeest Prize 2014 for Animal Alternatives
- Elected member of the Royal Netherlands Academy of Arts and Sciences (KNAW) (elected 2010)
- Radcliffe Fellowship, Harvard University (2007)
- Royal Society Fellowship, UK (1978, 1979)

== Patents ==
Prof. Mummery is part of five different patents on differentiation of cardiomyocytes and hESC.

- GB patent 2394958A, Mummery, Christine Lindsay, "Methods of inducing differentiation of stem cells", published 22 July 2002
- AU patent 2004219990A1, Mummery, Christine Lindsay, "Differentiation of human embryonic stem cells to cardiomyocytes", published 22 July 2002
- WO patent 2004110912A2, Steinhardt, Mark John, "Applicator for and method of applying a sheet material to a substrate", published 23 December 2004
- GB patent 2415437A, Doevendans, Petrus Adrianus; Mummery, Christine Lindsay; Tertoolen, Leon Gerardus Joseph, "Differentiation of human embryonic stem cells to cardiomyocytes", published 28 December 2005
- WO patent 2006066320A1, Mummery, Christine Lindsay; Passier, Robert, "Differentiation of human embryonic stem cells and cardiomyocytes and cardiomyocyte progenitors derived therefrom", published 29 June 2006
- GB patent 2429718A, Mummery, Christine Lindsay; Passier, Robert, "Improved cardiomyocyte differentiation", published 31 May 2004

== Books ==
Mummery co-authored “Stem Cells, 2nd edition scientific facts and Fiction” (Elsevier 2014). This second edition contains introduction to embryonic and iPS cells and stem cells. It also features additional information on "organs on chips" and adult progenitor cells.
