= Ionat Zurr =

Australian artist and researcher

Dr. Ionat Zurr is an Australian artist, researcher and curator. She is also a lecturer for the University of Western Australia (UWA), and has been a visiting tutor in Design Interactions for the Royal College of Art. Zurr, together with Oron Catts, founded the Tissue Culture & Art Project in 1996, they were both guest artists at CERN in 2019. Zurr worked for more than 20 years at SymbioticA, UWA's Centre of Excellence in Biological Arts, and is a pioneer of making art with living, engineered tissue.

Zurr is the Chair of the Fine Arts discipline at UWA's School of Design, and instigated the Master of Science (Biological Arts), an interdisciplinary program involving both art and science.

== See also ==
- Victimless Leather
