= Yashas Shetty =

Indian contemporary artist

Yashas Shetty is an Indian contemporary artist. He is most well known for his work with (Art)ScienceBLR and the Indian Sonic Research Organization (ISRO). In 2009 he founded Hackteria, with the artists Andy Gracie and the biohacker Marc Dusseiller while all three were in residence at Medialab-Prado in Madrid.

He is a faculty member of the Srishti Institute of Art Design and Technology and a founding member of the Center for Experimental Media Art (CEMA). His students have successfully constructed low cost innovation products microscope from webcam, a low speed centrifuge from egg beater and low cost incubator designed from cardboard and have won awards at the International Genetically Engineered Machine (IGEM) competition. He is also the host at The Radio Quarantine, a Bangalore based community radio that ran during the COVID-19 pandemic lockdown.
