= Bioart =

Artwork involving living organisms

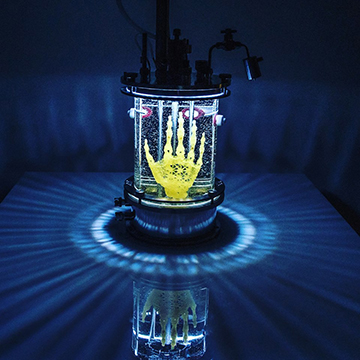
Regenerative Reliquary (2016) by American bioartist Amy Karle. Human stem cells were grown to form bone over a preformed hydrogel scaffold in the shape of a hand.

Bioart is an art practice where artists work with biology, live tissues, bacteria, living organisms, and life processes. Using scientific processes and practices such as biology and life science practices, microscopy, and biotechnology (including technologies such as genetic engineering, tissue culture, and cloning) the artworks are produced in laboratories, galleries, or artists' studios. The scope of bioart is a range considered by some artists to be strictly limited to "living forms", while other artists include art that uses the imagery of contemporary medicine and biological research, or require that it address a controversy or blind spot posed by the very character of the life sciences.

Bioart originated at the end of the 20th century and beginning of the 21st century. Although bioartists work with living matter, there is some debate as to the stages at which matter can be considered to be alive or living. Creating living beings and practicing in the life sciences brings about ethical, social, and aesthetic inquiry. With his essay “Biotechnology and Art” from 1981, Peter Weibel introduced the term bioart, and defined an art movement that uses biological systems as a means of artistic expression.

The creation of living beings and the study of the biological sciences bring with them ethical, social and aesthetic questions. Within Bio Art there is a debate about whether any form of artistic engagement with the biosciences and their social consequences (e.g. in the form of images from medicine) should be viewed as part of the art movement, or whether only such works of art, that were created in the laboratory are classified as organic art.

== Overview ==
Bioart is often intended to highlight themes and beauty in biological subjects, address or question philosophical notions or trends in science, and can at times be shocking or humorous. One survey of the field, Isotope: A Journal of Literary Science and Nature Writing, puts it this way: "Bioart is often ludicrous. It can be lumpy, gross, unsanitary, sometimes invisible, and tricky to keep still on the auction block. But at the same time, it does something very traditional that art is supposed to do: draw attention to the beautiful and grotesque details of nature that we might otherwise never see." While raising questions about the role of science in society, "most of these works tend toward social reflection, conveying political and societal criticism through the combination of artistic and scientific processes." Works of bioart are most often seen as a contribution to the social, political and economic questions that arise from scientific research, however at times contribute and make advancements in research.

== Artists in laboratories ==
While most people who practice bioart are categorized as artists in this new media, they can also be seen as scientists. In bioart, artists often work with scientists, and in some cases they are scientists themselves. While some artists have prior scientific training, others must be trained to perform the procedures or work in tandem with scientists who can perform the tasks that are required.

=== Historical bioart ===
In previous centuries artists dealt more critically with the images from the life sciences and understand them not only as a mere illustration of biological findings, but as a process linked to the time and the respective style vocabulary. Leonardo da Vinci born 1452, renowned for masterpieces like the Mona Lisa and The Last Supper, was deeply invested in the intersection of science and art. To produce accurate and realistic art, he conducted firsthand, extensive studies of anatomy by dissecting around 30 human cadavers, sometimes dissecting multiple bodies in a single day. His pursuit of knowledge across the sciences, including detailed studies of plants, optics, and light, was driven by Da Vinci's goal to enhance his artistic representations. Leonardo da Vinci's deep exploration of human anatomy and movement anticipated modern robotics, as he connected anatomy to engineering and designed automata that mimicked human motion.

Ernst Haeckel was a German biologist, zoologist, and artist of the late 19th and early 20th centuries who used art to illustrate his scientific findings before macrophotography and photographic microscopy. He meticulously recorded the hidden intricacies of natural forms through his vibrant and stylized drawings. His celebrated publication "Kunstformen Der Natur" (Artforms in Nature) from 1904 is regarded as a "visual encyclopedia" of living organisms even to this day. His work fusing biology and art, not only promoted Darwinism in Germany but also deeply influenced art, design, and architecture of the early 20th century.

=== Contemporary bioart ===
The concept of transgenic art was coined in 1998 by Eduardo Kac and refers to an art form “which works with genetic methods to transplant synthetic genes into one organism or natural genetic material from one species into another and thus to create unique living beings.” Already before this definition, Reiner Maria Matysik presented an art project in 1986 named Rekombination The goal of transgenic art is to create organisms that carry foreign DNA within them. In Kac's vision, art can continue evolution and make an actual creation of new living beings. Eduardo Kac's best-known works include Genesis (1998/99), The Eight Day (2000/2001) and GFP Bunny (2000) which he commissioned in 2000 as the creation of a transgenic GFP rabbit. "The PR campaign included a picture of Kac holding a white rabbit and another rabbit photographically enhanced to appear green."

Symbiotica developed one of the earlier art/science laboratories for artists interested in working with bioart methods and technologies. Some of the founders of SymbioticA, Oron Catts and Ionat Zurr also founded The Tissue Culture & Art Project. Since the early 1990s, The Tissue Culture & Art Project has been working with the artificial production of biological tissue whereas the cell culture serves as an artistic medium. The works of TC&A deal, among other things, with foods bred foods, tissue-growing clothing, sculptural forms from fabric culture and the changing relationship between the living and non-living company, among other things. Within the framework of their artistic research, the artists have developed the term “Semi-Living” to describe a new category of life that was created in the laboratory.

In 2003, The Tissue Culture & Art Project in collaboration with Stelarc grew a 1/4 scale replica of an ear using human cells to create the Extra Ear project. The project was carried out at Symbiotica: the Art & Science Collaborative Research Laboratory, School of Anatomy and Human Biology, University of Western Australia. In 2006, Marc Stelarc had the first of two experimental surgeries to have his “Ear On Arm” implanted. The second surgery was to implant a microphone in the implanted ear so it could hear. The implanted ear then projects the sound to other parts of the world, so people could listen into what the ear on arm was hearing. He has connected it to the internet, which further connects his bio to technology but also opens the possibility of being hacked. The project took over 12 years.

In 2004, Suzanne Anker and Dorothy Nelkin's The Molecular Gaze also helped establish the integration of molecular biology with artistic practice.

In 2009 the project Bulletproof Skin by Jalila Essaïdi received international attention for integrating spider silk from GM goats into human skin tissue. The work provoked debate about possible military applications as bullet-resistant skin, and helped bring the bioart movement into mainstream awareness through global media coverage such as CNN, FOX and the BBC. The success of the project led Jalila Essaïdi to establish of the BioArt Laboratories foundation in Eindhoven, later recognized as the national research institute for the biological arts in the Netherlands. Together with MU Hybrid Art House and ZonMw (the Netherlands Organisation for Health Research and Development) the foundation co-founded the international Bio Art & Design Award, which for over a decade fostered collaboration between leading research institutes and artists. Each year three winners received €25,000 in funding (a total of €75,000 annually), amounting to over €825,000 awarded during the program’s run. The foundation and award played an important role in the development of the bioart movement by structurally linking emerging artists with scientific laboratories and enabling projects that later gained international recognition at institutions such as the Centre Pompidou, the Venice Biennale, and the Museum of Modern Art.

In 2015-2016 Amy Karle created Regenerative Reliquary, a sculpture of bio-printed scaffolds for human MSC stem cell culture into bone, in the shape of a human hand form installed in a vessel. In 2019, Karle made The Heart Of Evolution, a 3D printed heart featuring a redesigned vascular system to potentially improve the heart's functionality and mitigate the impact of embolism. In 2024 she created an interactive artwork Echoes From the Valley of Existence, which sends DNA samples converted into powder and encased in a polymer into space.

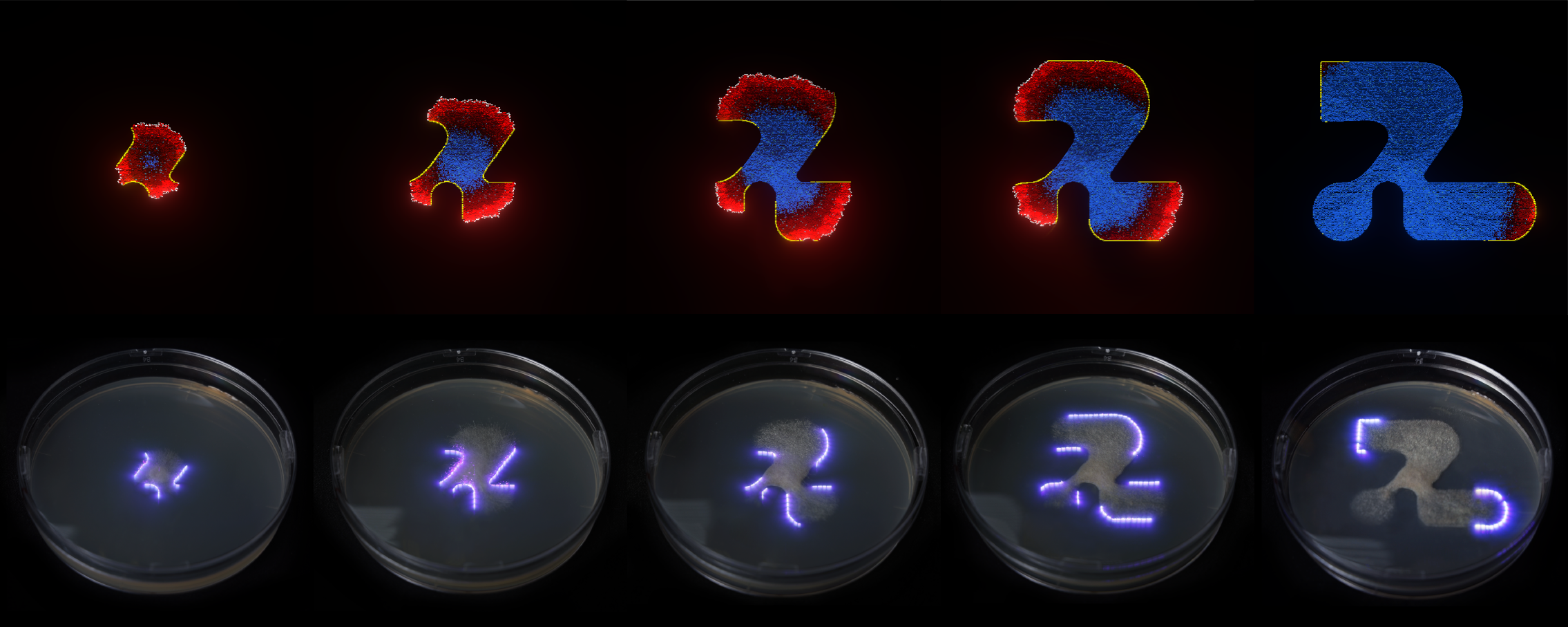
Filamentous fungi guided into a cursor shape by laser on an agar plate, time-lapse sequence. Kexin Wang et al., SIGGRAPH Asia 2024.

In 2024, Kexin Wang and collaborators from Brown University, the Rhode Island School of Design, and the Royal College of Art presented a zero-coding tool at SIGGRAPH Asia designed for artists working with living filamentous fungi as a creative medium. The system employs a neural network-driven cellular automaton to simulate fungal morphology, synchronised with a laser that exploits the organism's photophobia to contain mycelium growth within pre-designed shapes on agar plates, enabling artists to produce living biological drawings without programming expertise.

Bioart continues to evolve into the mid-2020s to address issues of environmental sustainability and social justice.

== Art addressing topics in biology and society ==
The scope of the term bioart is a subject of ongoing debate. The primary point of debate centers around whether bioart must necessarily involve manipulation of biological material, as is the case in microbial art which by definition is made of microbes. A broader definition of the term would include work that addresses the social and ethical considerations of the biological sciences. Under these terms bioart as a genre has many crossovers with fields such as critical or speculative design. This type of work often reaches a much broader general audience, and is focused on starting discussions in this space, rather than pioneering or even using specific biological practices. Examples in this space include Ray Fish shoes, which advertised shoes made and patterned with genetically engineered stingray skin, BiteLabs, a biotech startup that attempted to make salami out of meat cultured from celebrity tissue samples, and Ken Rinaldo's Augmented Fish Reality, an installation of five rolling robotic fish-bowl sculptures controlled by Siamese Fighting Fish.

== Controversy ==
Artworks that use living materials created with scientific processes and biotechnology in itself brings up many ethical questions and concerns. Wired magazine has reported that the "emerging field of 'bioart' can be extremely provocative, and brings with it a range of technical, logistical and ethical issues." Bioart practitioners can and have at times aided the advancement of scientific research and researchers in the process of creating their work; however, bioart and bioartists can also cross into controversy by challenging scientific thinking, by working with controversial human or animal material, or by releasing invasive species, as they are not regulated to adhere to standards, including biosafety or biosecurity.

Another big issue are the dangers that come from errors and fringe activities that could occur through creating in non-regulated or not completely safe lab spaces, DIYbio, biohacking, and bioterrorism. One of the most publicized instances of a non-scientist being arrested for suspected "bioterrorism" was the case of artist Steve Kurtz, a founding member of Critical Art Ensemble (arrest in 2004, bioterrorism charges never brought). He was investigated by the FBI for four years and culminated with him being indicated for mail and wire fraud for obtaining a strain of bacteria commonly used in school lab experiments. He was planning on using that bacteria in a project critiquing the United States. His bioart work was considered pioneering in politically engaged art, biotechnology and ecological struggle. The ordeal became the subject of a book and a film.

Bioart has been scrutinized and criticized as it may lack ethical oversight. USA Today reported that animal rights groups accused Kac and others of using animals unfairly for their own personal gain, and conservative groups question the use of transgenic technologies and tissue-culturing from a moral standpoint.

Alka Chandna, a senior researcher with PETA in Norfolk, Virginia, has stated that using animals for the sake of art is no different from using animal fur for clothing material. "Transgenic manipulation of animals is just a continuum of using animals for human end, regardless of whether it is done to make some sort of sociopolitical critique. The suffering and exacerbation of stress on the animals is very problematic."

Many bioart projects deal with the manipulation of cells and not whole organisms, such as Victimless Leather by the Tissue Culture & Art Project. "An actualized possibility of wearing 'leather' without killing an animal is offered as a starting point for cultural discussion. Our intention is not to provide yet another consumer product, but rather to raise questions about our exploitation of other living beings." However, due to rapid cell growth, the exhibit was eventually "killed" by cutting off its nutrients, aligning with the creators' intent to remind viewers of the responsibility towards manipulated life.

== Notable exhibitions of bioart ==
Ars Electronica in Linz, Austria and the Ars Electronica Festival was an early adaptor of exhibiting and promoting bioart, and continues to be a pioneer of sharing and promoting bioart, life projects, and bioartists. Their long-standing Prix Ars Electronica award which exhibits and honors artists in various media categories includes categories of hybrid arts and life art encompassing bioart.

In 2016, The Beijing Media Art Biennale's Theme was "Ethics of Technology" and in 2018 it was "<Post-Life>". The Biennale is held at the CAFA Museum in Beijing, China and includes major works in biological arts, with thematic exhibitions. The 2018 Bienalle included international artworks relevant to the thematic topics of "Data Life", "Mechanical Life", and "Synthesized Life" and a Lab Space exhibition area that focused on showcasing international laboratory practice in art and technology.

The Centre Pompidou in Paris, France presented La Fabrique Du Vivant ('The Fabric of the Living') in 2019, a group exhibition of living and artificial life with recent work of artists, designers, and research from scientific laboratories. The artworks question the links between the living and the artificial, as well as the processes of artificial recreation of life; the manipulation of chemical procedures on living matter; self-generating works with ever-changing forms; hybrid works of organic matter and industrial material, or the hybridization of human and plant cells. In this era of digital technologies, artists draw on the world of biology, developing new social and political environments based on issues of those living in this era.

The Mori Art Museum in Tokyo, Japan Future and the Arts: AI, Robotics, Cities, Life - How Humanity Will Live Tomorrow in 2019-2020 This was a group exhibition that included a "bio atelier" with bioartworks from prominent bioartists across the world. One of the curatorial goals was to evoke the contemplation – through the latest scientific and technological developments in fields such as artificial intelligence, biotechnology, robotics and augmented reality used in art, design, and architecture – of how human beings, their lives, and the environmental issues may look in the imminent future because of these developments.

== Gallery ==
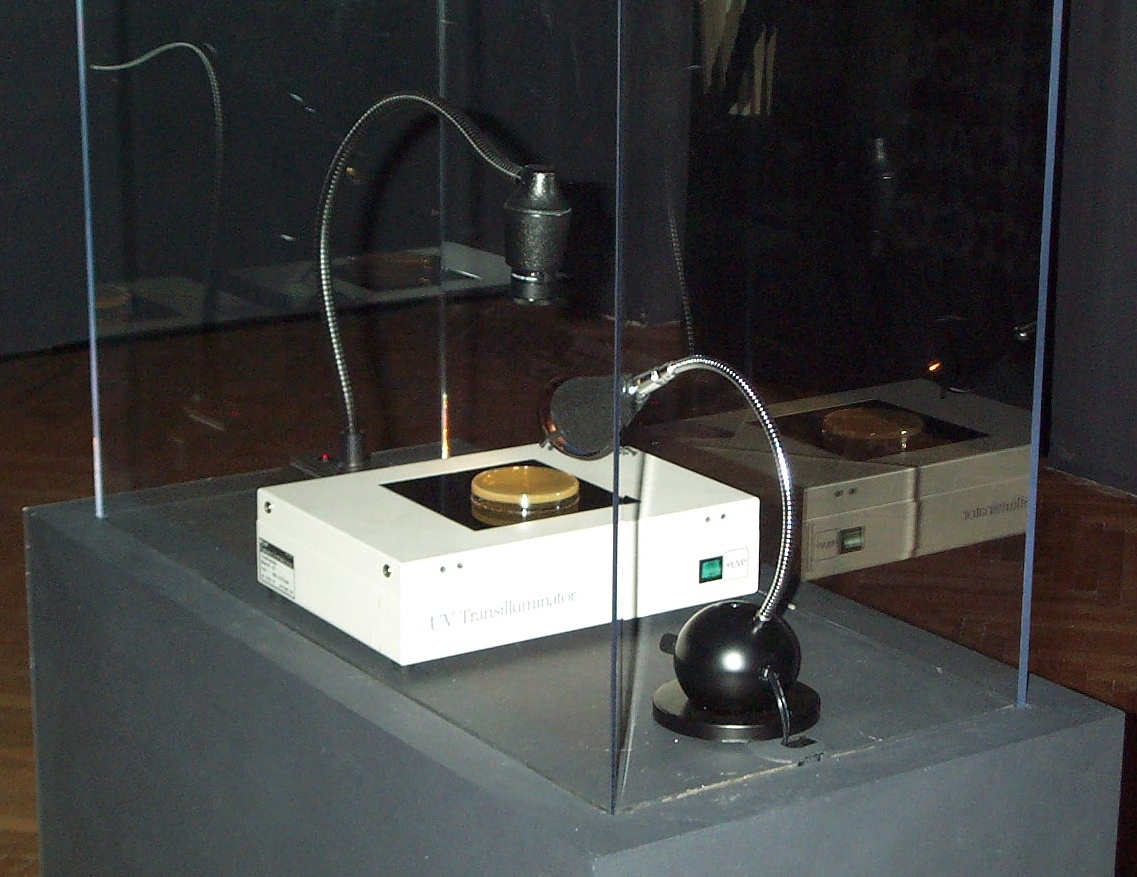
Genesis by Eduardo Kac, 1999

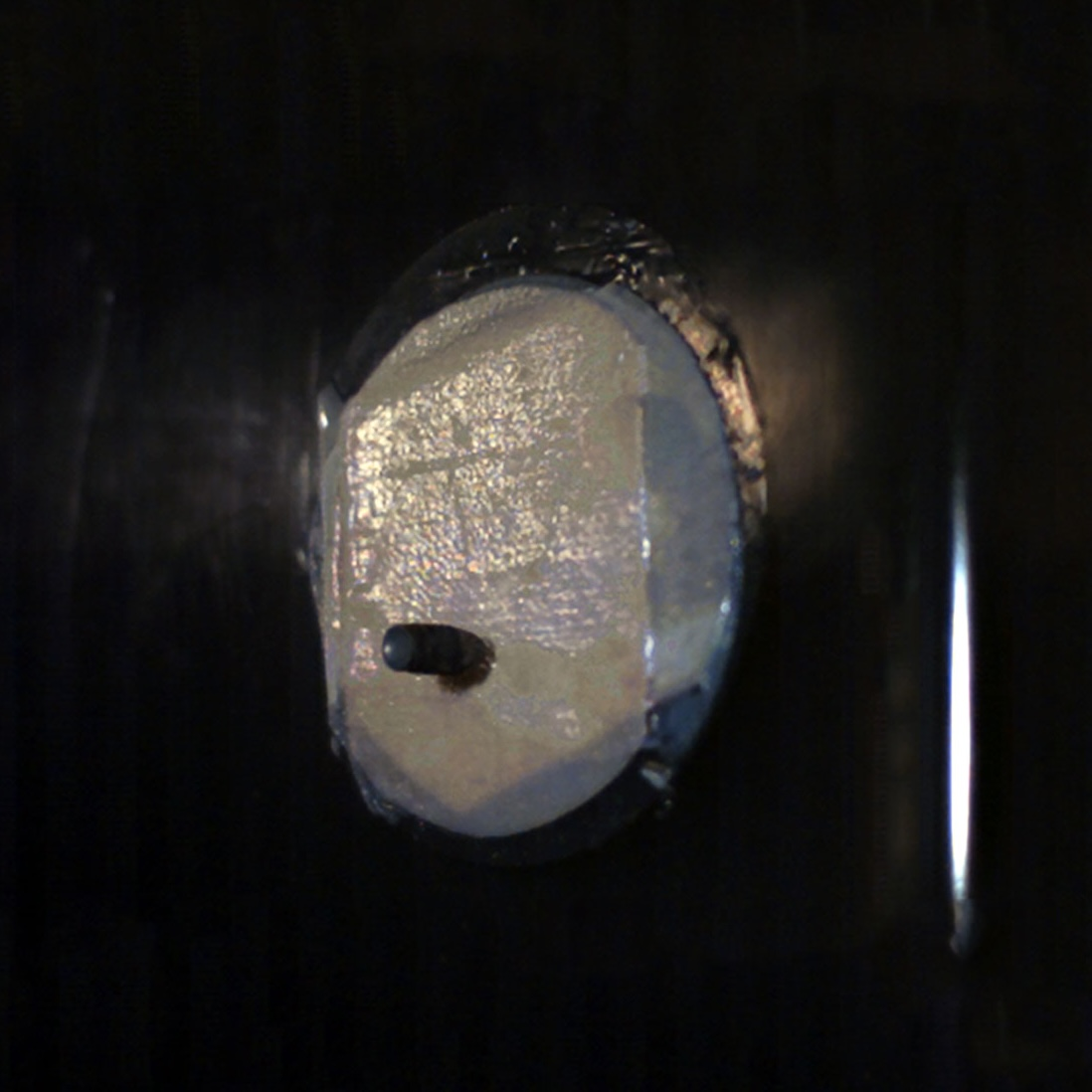
Bulletproof Skin by Jalila Essaidi, 2009

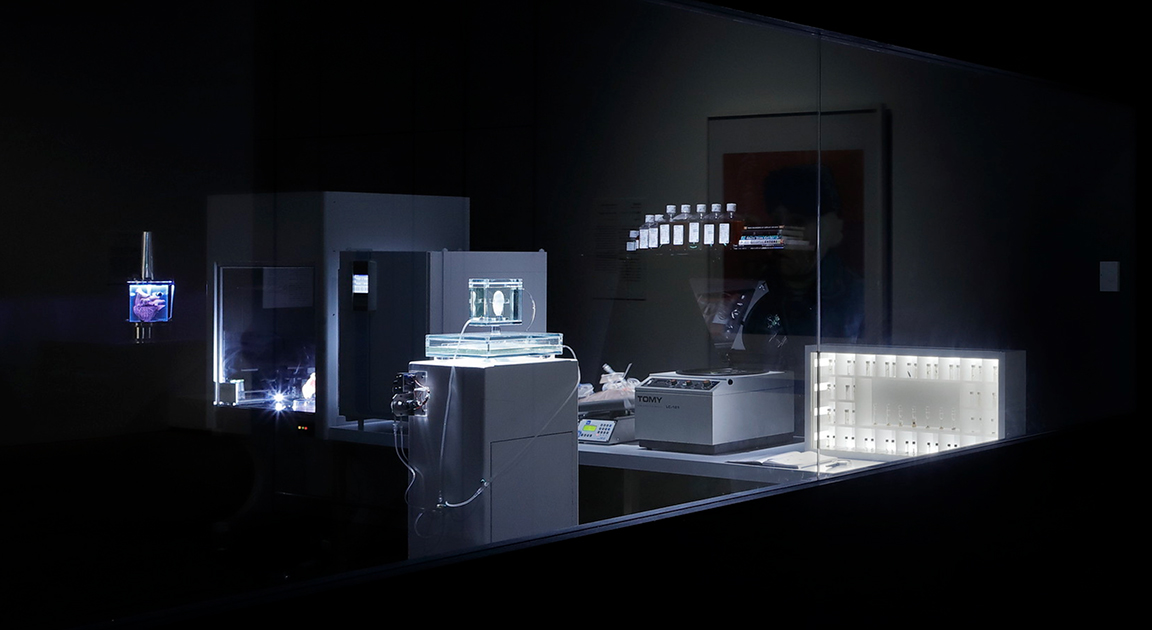
Bio Atelier at Mori Art Museum exhibiting bioart

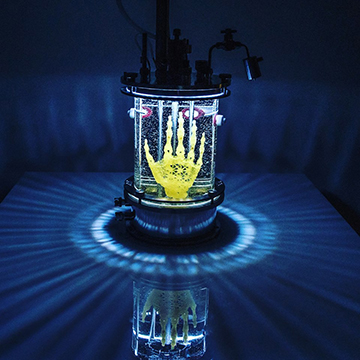
Regenerative Reliquary, Amy Karle, 2016

== See also ==
- Computer art
- Cyberarts
- Digital art
- Ecological art
- Electronic art
- Environmental art
- Evolutionary art
- Genetic art
- Hybrid arts
- Internet art
- Land art
- Neuroaesthetics
- New Media art

== Bibliography ==
- Anker, Suzanne, and Dorothy Nelkin. The Molecular Gaze: Art in the Genetic Age. Cold Spring Harbor, N.Y.: Cold Spring Harbor Laboratory Press, 2004. ISBN 978-087969-697-9.
- Bök, Christian. The Xenotext: Book I. Coach House Books, 2015.
- Da Costa, Beatriz, and Kavita Philip (eds.). Tactical Biopolitics: Art, Activism, and Technoscience. Cambridge: MIT Press, 2008.
- Gatti, Gianna Maria. The Technological Herbarium. Edited, translated from the Italian, and with a preface by Alan N. Shapiro. Berlin: Avinus Press, 2010. Online at alan-shapiro.com
- Gessert, George. Green Light: Toward an Art of Evolution. Cambridge: MIT Press/Leonardo Books, 2010. ISBN 978-0-262-01414-4.
- Hauser, Jens. "Bio Art - Taxonomy of an Etymological Monster." UCLA Art/Sci Center series, 2006. Online at
- Hauser, Jens (ed.). sk-interfaces. Exploding borders - creating membranes in art, technology and society. Liverpool: University of Liverpool Press, 2008. ISBN 978-1-84631-149-9.
- Kac, Eduardo.Telepresence and Bio Art. Ann Arbor: University of Michigan Press, 2005. ISBN 978-0-472-06810-4.
- Kac, Eduardo (ed.). Signs of Life: Bio Art and Beyond. Cambridge: MIT Press/Leonardo Books, 2007. ISBN 0-262-11293-0.
- Kaniarē, Asēmina, and Kathryn High. Institutional Critique to Hospitality: Bio Art Practice Now : A Critical Anthology, Grigoris publications, ISBN 9789606120190 2017.
- Nicole C. Karafyllis (ed.). Biofakte - Versuch über den Menschen zwischen Artefakt und Lebewesen. Paderborn: Mentis 2003. In German.
- Levy, Steven. "Best of Technology Writing 2007." Ann Arbor: University of Michigan Press, 2007 (in conjunction with DIGITALCULTUREBOOKS)
- Miah, Andy. (ed.). Human Futures: Art in an Age of Uncertainty. Liverpool: Liverpool University Press, 2008. ISBN 978-1-84631-181-9.
- Mitchell, Rob. Bioart and the Vitality of Media. Seattle: University of Washington Press, 2010. ISBN 978-0-295-99008-8.
- Mitchell, Rob, Helen Burgess, and Phillip Thurtle. Biofutures: Owning Body Parts and Information. Pennsylvania: University of Pennsylvania Press, 2008. Interactive DVD.
- Reichle, Ingeborg. Kunst aus dem Labor. Springer, 2005. In German. ISBN 978-3-211-22234-8
- Sammartano, Paola. Electrophotographs and Photographs with Human Hair for Future Cloning. Sergio Valle Duarte Zoom Internacional, 1995.
- Savini, Mario. Arte transgenica: la vita è il medium. Connessioni. Pisa: Pisa University Press, 2018. (pub.09/2018, ISBN 978-883339-0680)
- Schnugg, Claudia. Creating artscience collaboration : bringing value to organizations. Cham, Switzerland. ISBN 978-3-030-04549-4. OCLC 108901485
- Simou Panagiota, Tiligadis Konstantinos, Alexiou Athanasios. Exploring Artificial Intelligence Utilizing Bioart, 9th Artificial Intelligence Applications and Innovations Conference, IFIP AICT 412, pp. 687–692, 2013, © IFIP International Federation for Information Processing 2013, Springer.
- Thacker, Eugene. "Aesthetic Biology, Biological Art." Contextin' Art (Fall Issue, 2003). Online at
- Thacker, Eugene. The Global Genome - Biotechnology, Politics, and Culture (Massachusetts: MIT Press/Leonardo Books, 2006. pp. 305–320. ISBN 978-0-262-70116-7
- Vita-More, Natasha. "Brave BioArt 2: Shedding the Bio, Amassing the Nano, and Cultivating Emortal Life." "Reviewing the Future" Summit, Montreal, Canada, Coeur des Sciences, University of Quebec, 2007.
- Wilson, Stephen. "Art and Science Now: How scientific research and technological innovation are becoming key to 21st-century aesthetics." London, England: Thames and Hudson, 2012. ISBN 978-0-500-23868-4
- Zylinska, Johanna. Bioethics in the Age of New Media. Cambridge: MIT Press/Leonardo Books, 2009. ISBN 978-0-262-24056-7
