= Oron Catts =

Australian artist and researcher

- Born: Helsinki, Finland
- Education: Curtin University
- Known for: Visual Arts

Oron Catts is an Australian artist and researcher currently residing in Perth, Western Australia where he has been employed at the University of Western Australia since 1996. He works as an artistic director of SymbioticA, which he also co-founded. Together with Ionat Zurr he founded the Tissue Culture & Art Project. From 2000–2001 he was a Research Fellow at the Tissue Engineering and Organ Fabrication Laboratory at Harvard Medical School. He has also worked with numerous other bio-medical laboratories in several different countries.

== Works ==
Victimless Leather – a prototype of a stitch-less jacket, grown from cell cultures into a layer of tissue supported by a coat shaped polymer layer. This is a sub-project of the Tissue Culture & Art Project where the artists are growing a leather jacket without killing any animals. Growing the victimless leather problematizes the concept of garment by making it semi-living. This artistic grown garment is intended to confront people with the moral implications of wearing parts of dead animals for protective and aesthetic reasons and confronts notions of relationships with manipulated living systems. Controversy arose around this project when the museum ended the exhibition, thereby killing the living cells in the piece.

Catts and Ionat Zurr were invited guest artist to the physics laboratory CERN in Geneva in 2019, where they presented their work at SymbioticA.

Pig Wings Project with Ionat Zurr and Guy Ben-Ary was developed in 2000-2001 during a residency in the Tissue Engineering and Organ Fabrication Laboratory in Massachusetts General Hospital, Harvard Medical School. The work used tissue engineering and stem cell technologies in order to grow pig bone tissue in the shape of these three sets of wings. The Pig Wings Project presents the first ever wing-shaped objects grown using living pig tissue. This absurd work presents ethical questions regarding a near future where semi-living objects (objects which are partly alive and partly constructed) exist together with philosophical concepts around inter-species organ transplantation. Along with the Center for Genomic Gastronomy he has hosted a live cooking show called Art Meat Flesh from 2012-2019. Art Meat Flesh has featured research scientist Mark Post and other scientists and philosophers tasting and debating the future of protein in the kitchen.

== Personal life ==
Catts was born in Finland and lives in Australia
