= Skoll Centre for Social Entrepreneurship =

University of Oxford academic entity

The Skoll Centre for Social Entrepreneurship is an academic entity for the advancement of social entrepreneurship at Saïd Business School at the University of Oxford. The Centre's goal is to "maximise the impact of social entrepreneurship to transform unjust or unsatisfactory systems or practices around the world and address critical social and environmental challenges."

== History ==
In November 2003, the Skoll Foundation, a social entrepreneurship foundation founded by Jeff Skoll, donated $7.5 million to the Saïd Business School for the creation of The Skoll Centre for Social Entrepreneurship in order to promote the advancement of social entrepreneurship worldwide. The Centre acts as a network hub for social entrepreneurship, linking together key actors in the sector and contributing towards creating new and effective partnerships for sustainable social change. It engages in social innovation and aims to have a decisive influence on policy.

== Research and Education ==
The Skoll Centre’s research ranges across three main topic areas identified by practitioners as of key importance: governance; resources; impact. In each area, a variety of scholarly work is being undertaken. This is disseminated in both applied working paper formats and in peer-reviewed academic books and journals.

== Noted Alumni ==
- Tom Ravenscroft, Founder and CEO, Enabling Enterprise
- Candice Motran, Investment Director, Big Society Capital
- Kingsley Ezeani, Managing Director, Techhive Africa
- Anshu Taneja, Country Director for India, VisionSpring
- Sujeet Kumar, Special Secretary, Government of Odisha and Advisor at Kalinga Kusum Foundation

== See also ==
- Jeff Skoll
- Skoll Foundation
- Saïd Business School
- Social entrepreneurship
