= Hybrid art =

Art that combines multiple mediums, disciplines, and technologies

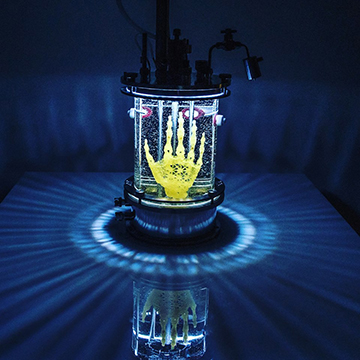
Regenerative Reliquary by Amy Karle, 2016 is a hybrid art / bioart sculpture of a 3D bioprinted hand sculpture installed in a bioreactor with stem cells. Exhibited at Ars Electronica under Hybrid Art, BioArt, and AI.

Hybrid Art is an innovative and interdisciplinary form of artistic expression that combines multiple mediums, techniques, technologies, and conceptual approaches. This contemporary art movement emerged from the convergence of traditional artistic methods with new technologies, digital innovations, and cross-cultural influences, challenging conventional boundaries between distinct art forms. By integrating various artistic disciplines such as painting, photography, sculpture, digital media, performance, sound, and interactive technologies, hybrid art creates complex, multilayered works that reflect our increasingly interconnected and technologically mediated world. Many Hybrid Art projects also integrate diverse fields of research such as biology, IT, data science, and robotics.

== Evolution of the term ==
More and more hybrid artists are responding to the central role scientific and technological research plays in contemporary culture. They are going beyond merely using technological tools and gadgets (e.g. computers) in their work to engage deeply with the processes of research. They are creating revolutionary art at the frontiers of scientific research. They see art as an independent zone of research that pursues areas of science and research ignored by mainstream academic disciplines. They are developing technologies that would be rejected by the marketplace but are nonetheless culturally critical. They are pursuing inquiries that are seen as too controversial, too wacky, too improbable, too speculative for regular science and technology. Their theoretical orientation ranges from celebration of human curiosity to critique of science's arrogance. They enter into the processes in research at all stages: setting research agendas, development of research processes, visualization, interpretations of findings, and education of the public.

It shares a common origin with computer and internet art, but reaches out to cover many new disciplines. Ars Electronica, which is considered one of leading world organizations concerned with experimental arts, decided at some point before 2010 to create a new category to encompass these kinds of art. Every year they host an international competition for artists working in these experimental fields. They decided to use the name 'Hybrid Art'. The worldwide community of artists, theorists, and journalists interested in this artform are increasingly using this term.

Many new support systems have evolved to nurture, show, and interpret this kind of art. New educational programs have been developed.

== Sample of the research fields addressed in hybrid art ==
- Genetics, Bioengineering, stem cells, proteomics
- Art and Biology of Living Systems: microorganisms, plants, animals, ecology
- Human Biology: the body, bionics, body manipulation, brain & body processes, body imaging, and medicine
- Physical Sciences: particle physics, atomic energy, geology, physics, chemistry, astronomy, space science, nanotechnology, materials science
- Kinetics, Electronics, Robotics: physical computing, ubiquitous computing, mixed reality
- Alternative Interfaces: motion, gesture, touch, facial expression, speech, wearable computing, 3d sound, and VR
- Code: algorithms, software art, genetic art, Alife, artificial intelligence
- Information Systems: databases, surveillance, RFID/barcodes, synthetic cinema, information visualization
- Telecommunications: telephone, radio, telepresence, web art, mobiles, locative media

== Organizations ==
Various organizations exist to promote, disseminate, and interpret new art activities. The Leonardo journal published by MIT Press has a 40-year history of "promoting and documenting work at the intersection of the arts, sciences, and technology, and... encouraging and stimulating collaboration between artists, scientists, and technologists."

Other organizations offer public events and facilitate the process of artists collaborating with researchers. For example, The Arts Catalyst in the UK seeks to "extend the practice of artists engaging with scientific processes, facilities and technologies in order to reveal and illuminate the social, political and cultural contexts that brought them into being" through public symposia, exhibitions, and commissions.

SymbioticA in Australia is an "artistic laboratory dedicated to the research, learning and critique of life sciences." It "provides an opportunity for researchers to pursue curiosity-based explorations free of the demands and constraints associated with the current culture of scientific research." The arts lab is sponsored by the medicine department at the University of Western Australia.

Other examples include the Art and Genomics Centre (NL), the LABoral Centro de Arte y Creación Industrial (ES) and Artists in Labs (CH) program.

New forms of educational programs are being established at universities around the world. Students are expected to master topics in art, media, and research disciplines. For example, the University of Washington’s DXArts "prepares artists to pursue original creative and technical research in Digital Arts and Experimental Media and pioneer lasting innovations on which future artists and scholars can build."

The Conceptual/Information Arts (CIA) is the "experimental program within the Art Department at San Francisco State University dedicated to preparing artists and media experimentors to work at the cutting edge of science and technology". Courses cover topics such as art & biology, robotics, locative media, and physical computing.

== See also ==
- Computer art
- Cyberarts
- Digital art
- Electronic art
- Internet art
- New Media art
- Bioart
