= Carl Cheng =

American artist and inventor (born 1942)

- Born: 1942 (age 83–84)
- Education: M.F.A., UCLA (1967), B.A., UCLA (1963)
- Known for: New Media Art, Machine Art, Environmental Art, Technology Art
- Notable work: Erosion Machine (1969), Supply & Demand (1972), Natural Museum of Modern Art (1978)

Carl Cheng (born Fu Kong Cheng in 1942) is an American contemporary artist and inventor whose work explores the intersection of fine art, industrial design, technology, and ecological systems. His practice, including works produced under the name John Doe Co., reflects a longstanding interest in the conditions of the Anthropocene, including the climate crisis.

== Early life and education ==
Cheng was born in San Francisco, California in 1942. His parents were immigrants from the Guangdong province of southern China. He was raised in the San Fernando Valley with his two brothers.

Cheng attended the University of California, Los Angeles in the 1960s for his bachelor's (1963) and master's (1967) degrees, initially studying fine art and industrial design before moving into photography and new media. During his time at UCLA, he became deeply influenced by the technological advancements and environmental concerns of the era, which would become central to his artistic practice. He also spent time studying the Bauhaus-style curriculum at the Folkwang School of the Arts in Essen, Germany and briefly worked for designers Charles and Ray Eames.

== Career and major works ==
=== John Doe Co. ===
In the late 1960s and 1970s, Cheng created work under the pseudo-anonymous moniker John Doe Co., incorporating his studio under that name in 1967. A range of practical and conceptual explanations for this decision by both Cheng himself and art critics, curators, and historians writing about his work, including that the move was a critique of corporate culture, that accountant advised him that it would be beneficial for tax reasons, and because other hi-tech companies were more likely to respond to his requests for material samples if it came on company letterhead. His choice of the name "John Doe" also reflected a desire to highlight and undermine anti-Asian discrimination in the wake of the Vietnam War.

Cheng produced John Doe Co. brochures to advertise his works during this time, using the language of tools, machines, devices, and products to describe them. Early Warning System (1967) incorporated a projector system and responded to weather reports. Sculptural "nature machines" such as his Erosion Machine series (1969) simulated natural processes, offering viewers opportunities to engage directly with controlled ecological systems. In Emergency Nature Supply Kit (1970), Cheng provided viewers with a handheld carrying case filled with a patch of grass and a device for playing bird sounds to be used in an apocalyptic scenario, as demonstrated in an included film strip. Supply and Demand (1972) created an enclosed humidified system for growing venus flytraps.

=== 1980s to present ===
From the 1980s onward, Cheng expanded his practice with larger installations and public art projects that interrogated humanity’s impact on the environment. Cheng’s Natural Museum of Modern Art series (1978–80) created immersive, site-specific installation in a condemned building on the Santa Monica Pier. The installation included an interactive coin-operated kiosk that used organic tools such as seashells and pelican beaks to create patterns in sand. His first public art commission, Seattle Underwater (1980) presented a water-filled window frame at a high viewpoint in Seattle, where visitors saw the city submerged underwater with bubbles rising, leaving its meaning open to interpretation. Another public art commission, Santa Monica Art Tool (Walk on L.A.) (1983–88), was a large concrete roller designed to be dragged behind a tractor across the sand, imprinting a three-dimensional model of the city onto the beach that could be erased by footprints or the wind.

In Anthropocene Landscape (2006), Cheng arranged grids of green and gold computer microchips to resemble industrial agricultural landscapes. His interactive installation Tar Pool Project (2020), developed during a residency at the Los Angeles County Museum of Art (LACMA), contained pool of bubbling tar that mimicked natural asphalt seeps. More recently, in Human Landscapes (2024), Cheng created an abstract, large-scale topographical map in sand within a gallery space.

== Exhibitions and awards ==
Major exhibitions of Cheng's work include Human Nature at Philip Martin Gallery (2022) and Carl Cheng: Nature Never Loses at the Contemporary Austin (2024) and Philadelphia Institute of Contemporary Art (2025). Cheng received an Art + Technology Grant from LACMA in 2017. Cheng was awarded the Hammer Museum's Career Achievement Award (2026).
