= SymbioticA =

Artistic research laboratory

SymbioticA Logo

SymbioticA was an artistic research lab at the University of Western Australia's School of Human Sciences. The lab looks at biology and the life sciences from an artistic point of view and has been used to research, develop and execute a number of contemporary art & science and bioart projects.

== History ==
SymbioticA's laboratory was launched in 2000 by artists Oron Catts and Ionat Zurr, biologist Miranda Grounds, and neuroscientist Stuart Bunt. Catts and Zurr began working with biological materials as part of the Tissue Culture and Art Project (TC&A). Grounds, a senior honorary research fellow, researches skeletal muscle repair and Bunt, a professorial fellow, researches spinal cord injury and regeneration. SymbioticA was created as a transdisciplinary research laboratory for creative bioresearch that critically engages with contemporary uses of biology.

In October 2022, SymbioticA was given notice by the University that it would be defunded unless it could justify the continued expense. This drew objections and protests from students, and a petition for funding to be continued garnered 11,000 signatures within a fortnight.

Despite over 13,000 signatures on petitions and hundreds of letters and alternative proposals submitted to UWA management, the university confirmed in December 2022 that SymbioticA would permanently close on 30 June 2024, following an eighteen-month transition period to allow postgraduate students to complete their studies. Co-founder Oron Catts stated that, following the closure, proponents of biological arts were “back to square one” in convincing institutions to support the field.

== Academic programs ==
SymbioticA's academic program is available to artists, designers, architects, scientists and humanities scholars who wish to engage in creative bioresearch. SymbioticA offers multiple postgraduate degrees including Masters of Biological Arts (MBiolArts) by coursework, Masters of Biological Arts (MBiolArts) by research and Doctor of Philosophy (PhD) by research. As part of SymbioticA's transdisciplinary ethos, students undertaking the Masters by coursework are required to engage in both art and science units. Students undertaking SymbioticA's Masters by research program develop novel research under the supervision of the academic coordinator. Both master's degrees are two year programs and the PhD program is a minimum of four years. PhD researchers work independently, generating substantial and original work in their specific field of knowledge.

== Residency program ==
The residency program is open to practitioners from multiple fields of study including artists, scientists, designers, architects and humanities scholars. SymbioticA provides a research environment where residents engage with hands-on biological practises. Residents are provided access to laboratories and trained in scientific and technical knowledge related to their field of study. Additionally, residents are connected with mentors to ensure they can make the most of their experience. More than 120 residents had undertaken research projects at SymbioticA, including visual and performance artists, art historians, geographers, musicians, political theorists, science fiction writers and scientists. Notable residents include Kathy High, Paul Vanouse, Phil Gamblen, Orlan and the Critical Art Ensemble.

== Workshops ==
In addition to the academic and residency programs, SymbioticA also conducts workshops within Australia and overseas. These workshops engage with contemporary biotechnologies in order to delve into larger philosophical and ethical issues surrounding the extent to which humans manipulate other living organisms. SymbioticA features workshops lasting two to five days, often demonstrating techniques common in synthetic biology, animal tissue culture and tissue engineering.

== Awards ==
In 2007 the lab won the inaugural Golden Nica for Hybrid Arts in the Prix Ars Electronica, selected from more than 400 entries as an organisation that “epitomised a space that transgresses boundaries and disciplines.” The following year, SymbioticA received the Western Australian Premier’s Prize for Excellence in Science Communication Outside the Classroom.

== Sources ==
- "Culture: Artists in the Lab." Martin Kemp. Nature. 477, 278–279 (15 September 2011) doi:10.1038/477278a
- "Culture: Art That Touches a Nerve." Anthony King. Nature 470, 334 (17 February 2011) doi:10.1038/470334a
- "When Artists Enter the Laboratory." Dixon, et al. Science 18 February 2011: 860. DOI:10.1126/science.1203549
- Symbiotica homepage
- About us
