= Radio Quarantine =

Indian community radio and podcast

- Kolkata; India
- Broadcast area: International

Programming
- Languages: Bengali; Hindi; English
- Format: Community radio

History
- First air date: March 25, 2020

Links
- Webcast: ZenoFM
- Website: Website

Radio Quarantine or Radio Quarantine Kolkata (abbreviated as RQK) was an Indian internet-based community radio and podcast. It was founded on 25 March 2020 by a group of professors, directors and PhD students in response to social isolation protocols imposed as a result of the COVID-19 pandemic.

== History ==
Radio Quarantine was launched on 25 March 2020 in the city of Kolkata, West Bengal. It was founded by a group of professors, directors and PhD students in response to social isolation protocols following the outbreak of the COVID-19 pandemic in India. The group was formed after the Government of West Bengal had announced that a lockdown in the state was to be imposed, and its launch coincided with the sudden imposition of the national lockdown by Prime Minister Narendra Modi, which had been ordered a day before on 24 March. The station began operation as a community radio run from studio setups at homes, with 10 administrators for technical and editorial oversight.

The broadcasts were hosted on the free-of-cost radio streaming platform ZenoRadio and went live at 4 pm on 25 March. The inaugural programme on the station was a 30-minute reading session by Sujaan Mukherjee, a researcher on the urban history of Kolkata at Jadavpur University. The station began as a 24/7 service with a mixture of pre-recorded original programmes and repeat programmes at other times, gathering around 5,000 listeners within the first nine days of its launch.

On May Day, Radio Quarantine held a collaboration with the Udichi Shilpi Goshti, the largest cultural organisation in Bangladesh; the station hosted a show featuring revolutionary songs and commemorated the 1886 Haymarket massacre by chronicling its history. It featured a show with a series of interviews on women workers from West Bengal and Bangladesh; the first half included interviews with domestic workers from West Bengal who described their loss of livelihood due to lack of regulations or a labour union to represent them in midst of the COVID-19 pandemic, while the second half of the show featured an interview with Taslima Akhter, the president of a Bangladeshi solidarity group for garment workers, who spoke about their exploitation and how the pandemic had made the situation worse by forcing workers to either starve or risk infection. Kasturi Basu, one of the administrators, states that the idea for collaborating with Bangladeshi individuals on May Day had come about during their planning of shows for the birth anniversary of Rabindranath Tagore on 7 May 2020. On Tagore's birth anniversary, the station aired a show called Bangladesher Hriday Hote (transl. From the Heart of Bangladesh) that featured interviews with individuals like the novelist Azizul Huq, biographer Jatin Sarkar, sociologist Anupam Sen and Moinul Abedin, the son of Zainul Abedin who had chronicled the 1943 Bengal famine through his paintings.

On 19 May 2020, the station hosted programmes narrating and discussing the Bengali Language Movement in the Barak Valley of Assam. The station also organised a memorial on 20 May 2020 to commemorate the death of Bengali journalist and freedom fighter Kamal Lohani, who was the founder of the Free Bengal Radio Station and had died of COVID-19. It stopped airing shows for a few weeks following the landfall of Cyclone Amphan and resumed streaming after electricity and connectivity were restored in Kolkata.

The radio station had produced over 350 episodes by the end of August and gathered an international audience. The relaxation of the lockdown led to less original programming being broadcast by the station, and by September, it had begun producing original programming in the form of podcasts with six to ten episodes per month.

== Format and shows ==
Radio Quarantine Kolkata ran as a 24x7 live internet radio hosted on ZenoFM and broadcasts a wide range of music from its collection. The radio broadcasts segments with interviews and news bulletins. The target audience consists of Bengalis including its international diaspora, attracting listeners from places like London and the United States.

During the pandemic, the station ran various programs and episodes throughout the day, featuring original programmes between 5 pm and 2 am. Its daily shows ended with a music segment hosted by the writer Sudipto Sanyal called Songs of Comfort for Hypochondriac and Pining Lovers, which featured an eclectic collection of Indian and International songs and continued till 2 am at night. Sanyal, who goes by the pseudonym RJ Bishakto Chochchori, continues to host the music segment every Saturday from around midnight onwards. The segment includes and has included music from Brazilian rock, Venezuelan folk, Bollywood songs, Palestinian reggae, Japanese pop, Habibi funk, Vietnamese hip hop and American jazz and hip hop, among others. The show has a focus on a variety of music from Brazil, and Sanyal describes it as a place for "football, jazz, music and resistance".

One of the popular segments of the station was Quarantine Diaries, which featured a daily news summary and included analysis of the controversial Citizenship Amendment Act and the associated National Register of Citizens amid the pandemic. Darshana Mitra, a professor at the National Institute of Juridicial Science, is associated with the segment. The singer and oral historian Moushumi Bhowmik hosted a segment which documented regional and cultural histories across Bengal, including those from Purulia to Sylhet to the Sundarbans, and occasionally featured interviews with various folk singers. Kankan Bhattacharyya hosted a show called Asamayer Katha, Samayer Gaan (transl. Untimely Talk, Timely Songs). It also included shows related to health advice which featured medical professionals.

The station also broadcast reading sessions through home recordings from participants, including monologues, poetry and short story readings, and had a children's segment. Recorded performances were crowdsourced from listener contributors, which were accepted based on a day's specified criterion and included experiences of individuals isolated in their homes. Some of these were gathered from minors and were aired on the children's segment. The children's segment was allotted an hour slot, which was occasionally hosted by a teacher based in the country of Norway. It involved short story readings, poem recitals and music.

Around September 2020, new original programmes were shifted to a podcast featuring six to ten episodes per month. The episodes include educational content related to science and technology in simplified language for the understanding of untrained adults and children. Other episodes relate to political, social and philosophical questions, including episodes on The Plague by Albert Camus, on Plague and Quarantine by Rajinder Singh Bedi and on Shada Prithibi (transl. White Earth) by Sharadindu Bandyopadhyay. The original programmes from the radio and the podcast were hosted on and archived across platforms such as YouTube and Spotify.
