= Laura Cinti =

British artist and researcher

- Education: Slade School of Fine Art; Goldsmiths; University of Hertfordshire
- Occupation: Artist
- Website: C-lab

Laura Cinti is an artist working with biology. She is the co-founder and co-director of C-LAB, a developing art and science studio lab, with Howard Boland who is the co-founder and artistic director of C-LAB and an artist working with synthetic biology.

Cinti has a PhD from the University College London (UCL) Slade School of Fine Art in interdisciplinary capacity with the UCL Centre of Biomedical Imaging, and an MA in Interactive Media: Critical Theory & Practice (Distinction) from Goldsmiths, University of London and BA (Hons) Fine Art (First Class) from University of Hertfordshire.

== Projects ==
- Martian Rose is an installation which carries the romantic and destructive idea of giving a rose to Mars. Using a planetary simulation chamber the exhibited rose has been exposed to Martian Environment for 6 hours. Mars is a cold place with plummeting temperatures from −60 °C down to −130 °C, the atmospheric pressure is less than 1% of earth's, much lower than on Mount Everest, the prevalent gas is carbon dioxide and UV light penetrates an unshielded atmosphere. The experiment took place on 27 March 2007 at the Mars Simulation Laboratory (University of Aarhus, Denmark) where two (miniature) red roses were subjected to proxy Martian parameters.
- The Cactus Project is transgenic artwork involving the fusion of human genetic material into the cactus genome resulting in the cactus expressing human hair.

== Bibliography ==
- Brent Waters, This Mortal Flesh: Incarnation and Bioethics, Brazos Press, 2009, 205 pages, English, ISBN 1-58743-251-X, ISBN 978-1-58743-251-4
- Brent Waters, From Human to Posthuman: Christian Theology And Technology in a Postmodern World , Ashgate Pub Co, 2006, 166 pages, English, ISBN 0-7546-3914-2, ISBN 978-0-7546-3915-2
- Elaine A. King and Gail Levin, Ethics And the Visual Arts, Allworth Press, 2006, 288 pages, English, ISBN 1-58115-458-5, ISBN 978-1-58115-458-0
