= Genesis (journal) =

Peer-reviewed scientific journal

- Discipline: Genetics, developmental biology
- Language: English
- Edited by: Sally A. Moody

Publication details
- Former name(s): Developmental Genetics
- History: 1979–present
- Publisher: Wiley-Liss
- Frequency: Monthly
- Impact factor: 2.487 (2020)

Standard abbreviations
- ISO 4: Genesis

Indexing
- Genesis
- CODEN: GNESFY
- ISSN: 1526-954X (print); 1526-968X (web)
- LCCN: sn99009370
- OCLC no.: 42463257
- Developmental Genetics
- ISSN: 0192-253X (print); 1520-6408 (web)

Links
- Journal homepage; Online access; Online archive

Genesis: The Journal of Genetics and Development (often styled genesis) is a peer-reviewed scientific journal of genetics and developmental biology. It was established as Developmental Genetics in 1979 and obtained its current title in 2000. In addition to original research articles, the journal also publishes letters to the editor and technology reports relevant to the understanding of the functions of genes. The editor-in-chief is Sally A. Moody (George Washington University).

== Abstracting and indexing ==
The journal is abstracted and indexed in:

- Abstracts in Anthropology
- Elsevier BIOBASE
- Biological Abstracts
- BIOSIS Previews
- Biotechnology Citation Index
- CAB Abstracts
- CAB HEALTH
- CABDirect
- Cambridge Scientific Abstracts
- Chemical Abstracts Service
- CSA Biological Sciences Database
- Current Contents/Life Sciences
- Current Opinion in Cell Biology
- Current Opinion in Obstetrics and Gynecology
- Current Opinion in Pediatrics
- EMBASE
- Embiology
- International Bibliographic Information on Dietary Supplements
- Index Medicus/MEDLINE/PubMed
- MEDLINE
- Neurosciences Abstracts
- Science Citation Index
- Scopus
- Soils and Fertilizers
- Veterinary Bulletin
- VINITI Database RAS
- Zoological Abstracts
- The Zoological Record

According to the Journal Citation Reports, the journal has a 2020 impact factor of 2.487, ranking it 22nd out of 41 journals in the category "Developmental Biology" and 118th out of 176 journals in the category "Genetics & Heredity".
