= Differentiation (journal) =

- Discipline: Cell biology
- Language: English
- Edited by: Colin Stewart

Publication details
- History: 1973-present
- Publisher: Elsevier on behalf of the International Society of Differentiation
- Frequency: 10/year
- Impact factor: 2.567 (2016)

Standard abbreviations
- ISO 4: Differentiation

Indexing
- CODEN: DFFNAW
- ISSN: 0301-4681 (print); 1432-0436 (web)
- LCCN: 74648484
- OCLC no.: 39976028

Links
- Journal homepage; Online access; Online archive

Differentiation is a peer-reviewed academic journal covering cell differentiation and cell development. It was established in 1973 and is published 10 times per year by Elsevier, on behalf of the International Society of Differentiation. The editor-in-chief are Loydie Jerome-Majewska (McGill University), Crystal Rogers (University of California, Davis), and Rosa Uribe (Rice University). According to the Journal Citation Reports, the journal has a 2022 impact factor of 2.9.
