= Timeline of cellular agriculture =

This page is a timeline of major events in the history of cellular agriculture. Cellular agriculture refers to the development of agricultural products - especially animal products - from cell cultures rather than the bodies of living organisms. This includes in vitro or cultured meat, as well as cultured dairy, eggs, leather, gelatin, and silk. In recent years a number of cellular animal agriculture companies and non-profits have emerged due to technological advances and increasing concern over the animal welfare and rights, environmental, and public health problems associated with conventional animal agriculture.

== Timeline ==
Year	Event
1912	French biologist Alexis Carrel keeps a piece of chick heart muscle alive in a Petri dish, demonstrating the possibility of keeping muscle tissue alive outside of the body.
1930	Frederick Edwin Smith, 1st Earl of Birkenhead predicts that "It will no longer be necessary to go to the extravagant length of rearing a bullock in order to eat its steak. From one 'parent' steak of choice tenderness it will be possible to grow as large and as juicy a steak as can be desired."
1932	Winston Churchill writes "Fifty years hence we shall escape the absurdity of growing a whole chicken in order to eat the breast or wing by growing these parts separately under a suitable medium."
Early 1950s	Willem van Eelen recognizes the possibility of generating meat from tissue culture.
1971	Russell Ross achieves the in vitro cultivation of muscular fibers.
1995	The U.S. Food and Drug Administration approves the use of commercial in-vitro meat production.
1999	Willem van Eelen secures the first patent for cultured meat.
2001	NASA begins in vitro meat experiments, producing cultured turkey meat.
2002	Researchers culture muscle tissue of the common goldfish in Petri dishes. The meat was judged by a test-panel to be acceptable as food.
2003	Oron Catts and Ionat Zurr of the Tissue Culture and Art Project and Harvard Medical School produce an edible steak from frog stem cells.
2004	Jason Matheny founds New Harvest, the first non-profit to work for the development of cultured meat.
2005	Dutch government agency SenterNovem begins funding cultured meat research.
2005	The first peer-reviewed journal article on lab-grown meat appears in Tissue Engineering.
2008	The In Vitro Meat Consortium holds the first international conference on the production of in vitro meat.
2008	People for the Ethical Treatment of Animals offers a $1 million prize to the first group to make a commercially viable lab-grown chicken by 2012.
2011	The company Modern Meadow, aimed at producing cultured leather and meat, is founded.
2013	The first cultured hamburger, developed by Dutch researcher Mark Post's lab, is taste-tested by Hanni Rützler.
2014	Muufri and The EVERY Company, companies aimed at producing cultured dairy and eggs, respectively, are founded with the assistance of New Harvest.
2014	Real Vegan Cheese, a startup aimed at creating cultured cheese, is founded.
2014	Modern Meadow presents "steak chips", discs of lab-grown meat that could be produced at relatively low cost.
2015	The Modern Agriculture Foundation, which focuses on developing cultured chicken meat (as chickens make up the large majority of land animals killed for food), is founded in Israel.
2015	According to Mark Post's lab, the cost of producing a cultured hamburger patty drops from $325,000 in 2013 to less than $12.
2016	New Crop Capital, a private venture capital fund investing in alternatives to animal agriculture - including cellular agriculture - is founded. Its $25 million portfolio includes cultured meat company Memphis Meats and cultured collagen company Geltor (formerly known as Gelzen), along with Lighter, a software platform designed to facilitate plant-based eating, a plant-based meal delivery service called Purple Carrot, a dairy alternative Lyrical Foods, the New Zealand plant-based meat company Sunfed, and alternative cheese company Miyoko’s Kitchen.
2016	The Good Food Institute, an organization devoted to promoting alternatives to animal food products - including cellular agriculture - is founded.
2016	Memphis Meats announces the creation of the first cultured meatball.
2016	New Harvest hosted New Harvest 2016: Experience Cellular Agriculture, the first-ever global cellular agriculture conference.
2018	Paul Shapiro's book Clean Meat: How Growing Meat Without Animals Will Revolutionize Dinner and the World, which chronicles the entrepreneurs, scientists and investors seeking to create the world's first slaughter-free meat. The book was placed on The Washington Post's bestseller list. That same year, the biotechnology company Geltor used lab-grown, animal-free leather to bind a copy of the Clean Meat book, an early example of cellular agriculture applied to materials beyond food.
2019	Perfect Day (formerly Muufri) sells 1000 3-pint bundles of ice cream made with non-animal whey protein.
2020	Memphis Meats received a US$161 million investment in its Series B, which is more than everything that had been invested in the industry so far which was US$155 million.
2020	The FDA issues a “no questions” letter in response to Perfect Day's GRAS notice (GRN No. 863) for its β-lactoglobulin produced by fermentation using Trichoderma reesei, a milk protein intended as a substitute for dairy- and plant-derived proteins in food.
2021	Tufts University is awarded US$10 million by the USDA to establish the National Institute for Cellular Agriculture.
2021	The FDA issues a “no questions” letter on The EVERY Company's (then Clara Foods Co.) GRAS notice (GRN No. 967) for a soluble egg-white protein (recombinant ovomucoid) produced by Komagataella phaffii and marketed as EVERY ClearEgg.
2023	The FDA issues a “no questions” letter on The EVERY Company's GRAS notice (GRN No. 1025) for an animal-free pepsin A enzyme preparation produced by Komagataella phaffii, for use in cheese production, protein hydrolysis, and brewing.
2023	The FDA issues a “no questions” letter on The EVERY Company's GRAS notice (GRN No. 1104) for a non-animal egg-white protein produced by Komagataella phaffii (marketed as EVERY Protein/EVERY EggWhite), intended as a substitute for hen egg-white protein across a range of foods.
2024	The FDA issues a “no questions” letter on Geltor's GRAS notice (GRN No. 1171) for a collagen polypeptide produced by Escherichia coli and marketed as PrimaColl, reportedly the first collagen added to the FDA inventory since 1999.
2024	Senara GmbH, with CEO Dr. Svenja Dannewitz Prosseda, presents the first-ever picture of a cell-cultivated milk at Slush in Helsinki and on their LinkedIn profile

== See also ==
- Cultured Meat
- Cellular agriculture
- Cellular Agriculture Society
- Beyond Meat
- Memphis Meats
- History of vegetarianism
- Timeline of animal welfare and rights
- Veganism
- Meat analogue
