= Isha Datar =

Canadian biotechnologist

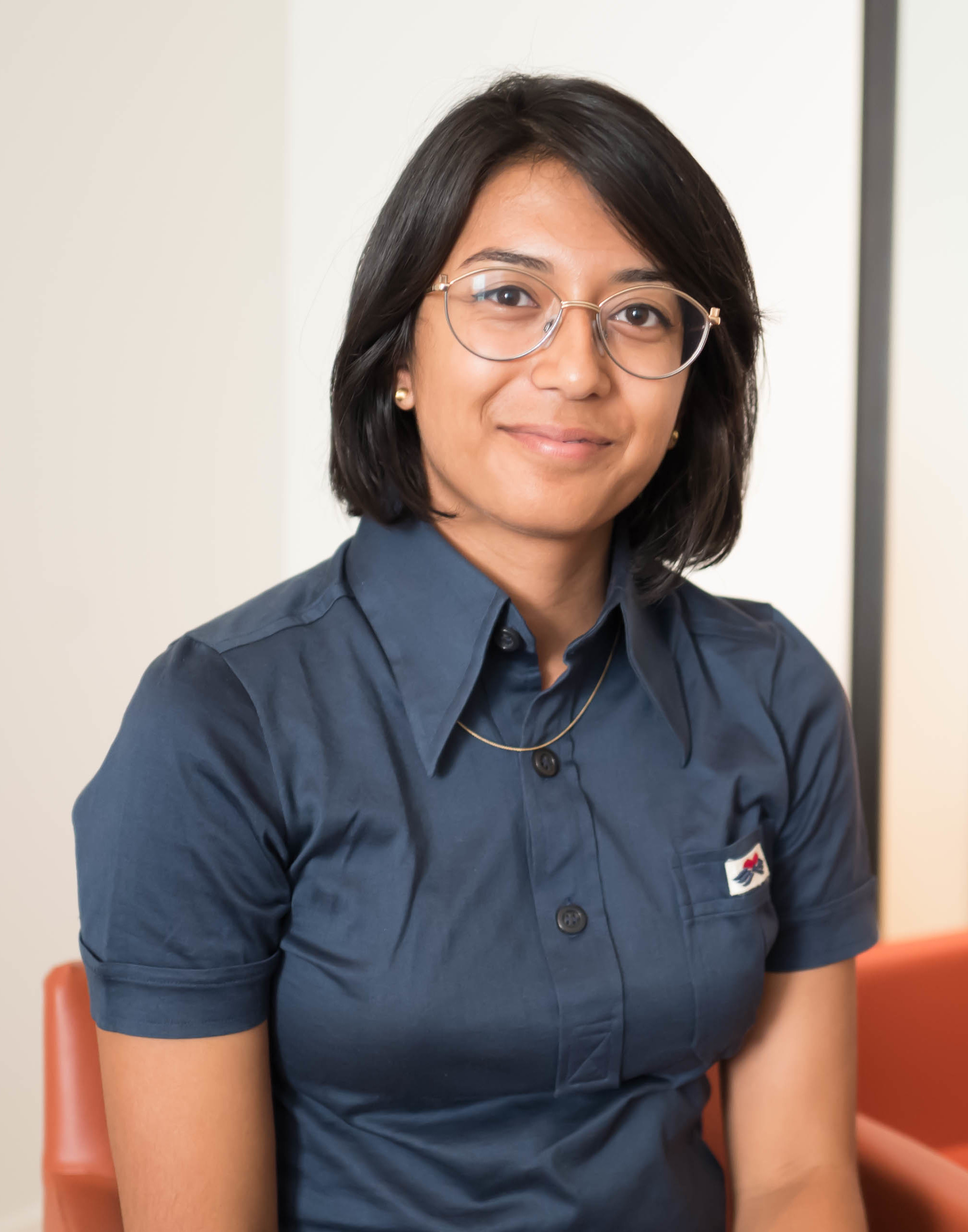
- Born: January 6, 1988 (age 38); Saskatoon, Saskatchewan, Canada
- Education: University of Alberta (BS); University of Toronto (MBiotech)
- Occupation: Executive Director of New Harvest
- Organization: New Harvest
- Website: New Harvest Profile

Isha Datar (born January 6, 1988) is the executive director of New Harvest, known for her work in cellular agriculture, the production of agricultural products from cell cultures.

== Early life and education ==
Datar was raised in Edmonton, Alberta, Canada. Her mother worked at a dairy farm, where Datar spent much of her childhood growing vegetables alongside her. Datar's mother was also a sculptor, and her father a doctor. After an elementary school field trip to a landfill, she became invested in reducing global waste and the impact of climate change. She received a B.S. from the University of Alberta in 2009. During her time as an undergraduate, Datar took a meat science class that challenged her idealistic vision of the sustainability of the animal agriculture industry and introduced her to cellular agriculture. Datar received her MBiotech from the University of Toronto Mississauga in 2013.

== Career ==
In 2009, Datar published "Possibilities for an in-vitro meat production system" in Innovative Food Science and Emerging Technologies, which detailed the progress of cellular agriculture. The paper was sent to Jason Matheny – founder and then-director of New Harvest – who forwarded the paper to those who were mentioned in it. In 2013, Datar became the chief executive officer at New Harvest. Datar also co-founded Muufri (now Perfect Day) and Clara Foods (now The EVERY Company). In 2021, Robert Downey Jr. funded Datar's work through his 'fast grants' project. Datar has been profiled in media venues including USA Today, the magazine Toronto Life, the Calgary Herald. She has spoken with NPR's Science Friday, The New Republic, Food & Wine magazine, and the National Observer.

== Awards and honors ==
Canadian Business spotlighted her work as a 2016 Change Agent. In 2019, Datar was named one of 25 Food and Agriculture Leaders to Watch by FoodTank.com.

Maclean's listed Isha Datar in its "The Power List: Top 10 Food Titans", where she is credited with coining the term cellular agriculture.
