= Cellular agriculture =

Production of agriculture products from cell cultures

Cellular agriculture is the production of agricultural products from cell cultures, using a combination of biotechnology, tissue engineering, molecular biology, and synthetic biology to create and design new methods for producing proteins, fats, and tissues that would otherwise be derived from traditional agriculture. This sector focuses primarily on the production of animal-derived products, including meat, milk,, honey, and eggs, obtained through cell culture. It is proposed as a sustainable alternative to livestock farming and slaughter, practices that pose significant global challenges in terms of environmental impact (e.g., of meat production), animal welfare, food security, and human health.

== History ==
Cellular agriculture products were first commercialized in the late 20th century with insulin and rennet.

On March 24, 1990, the FDA approved a bacterium genetically engineered to produce rennet, making it the first genetically engineered product for food. Rennet is a mixture of enzymes that turns milk into curds and whey in cheese making. Traditionally, rennet is extracted from the inner lining of the fourth stomach of calves. Today, cheese making processes use rennet enzymes from genetically engineered bacteria, fungi, or yeasts because they are unadulterated, more consistent, and less expensive than animal-derived rennet.

In 2004, Jason Matheny founded New Harvest, whose mission is to "accelerate breakthroughs in cellular agriculture". New Harvest provided the first PhD funding specifically for cellular agriculture at Tufts University.

By 2014, IndieBio, a synthetic biology accelerator in San Francisco, has incubated several cellular agriculture startups, hosting Muufri (making milk from cell culture, now Perfect Day Foods), The EVERY Company (making egg whites from cell culture), Gelzen (making gelatin from bacteria and yeast, now Geltor), Afineur (making cultured coffee beans) and Pembient (making rhino horn). Muufri and The EVERY Company were both initially sponsored by New Harvest.

In 2015, Mercy for Animals created The Good Food Institute, which promotes plant-based and cellular agriculture.

Also in 2015, Isha Datar coined the term "cellular agriculture" (often shortened to "cell ag") in a New Harvest Facebook group.

On July 13, 2016, New Harvest hosted the world's first international conference on cellular agriculture in San Francisco, California. The day after the conference, New Harvest hosted the first closed-door workshop for industry, academic, and government stakeholders in cellular agriculture.

In 2022, the first European Chair of Cellular Agriculture was created at the Technical University of Munich by Prof. Dr.-Ing. Marius Henkel.

== Research tools ==
Several key research tools are at the foundation of research in cellular agriculture. These include:

=== Cell lines ===
A fundamental issue in the advancement of cultured meat is the availability of appropriate cellular materials. While some methods and protocols from human and mouse cell culture may be applicable, most are not. This is evidenced by the fact that established protocols for creating human and mouse embryonic stem cells have not succeeded in establishing ungulate embryonic stem cell lines.

The ideal criteria for cell lines for the purpose of cultured meat production include immortality, high proliferative ability, surface independence, serum independence, and tissue-forming ability. The specific cell types most suitable for cellular agriculture are likely to differ from species to species.

=== Growth media ===
Conventional methods for growing animal tissue in culture involve the use of fetal bovine serum (FBS). FBS is a blood product extracted from fetal calves. This product supplies cells with nutrients and stimulating growth factors, but is unsustainable and resource-heavy to produce, with large batch-to-batch variation. Cultured meat companies have been putting significant resources into alternative growth media.

After the creation of the cell lines, efforts to remove serum from the growth media are key to the advancement of cellular agriculture as fetal bovine serum has been the target of most criticisms of cellular agriculture and cultured meat production. It is likely that two different media formulations will be required for each cell type: a proliferation media, for growth, and a differentiation media, for maturation.

=== Scaling technologies ===
As biotechnological processes are scaled, experiments start to become increasingly expensive, as bioreactors of increasing volume will have to be created. Each increase in size will require a re-optimization of various parameters such as unit operations, fluid dynamics, mass transfer, and reaction kinetics.

=== Scaffold materials ===
For cells to form tissue, it is helpful for a material scaffold to be added to provide structure. Scaffolds are crucial for cells to form tissues larger than 100 μm across. An ideal scaffold must be non-toxic for the cells, edible, and allow for the flow of nutrients and oxygen. It must also be cheap and easy to produce on a large scale without the need for animals.

=== 3D tissue systems ===
The final phase for creating cultured meat involves bringing together all the previous pieces of research to create large (>100 μm in diameter) pieces of tissue that can be made of mass-produced cells without the need for serum, where the scaffold is suitable for cells and humans.

== Applications ==
While the majority of the discussion has been around food applications, particular cultured meat, cellular agriculture can be used to create any kind of agricultural product, including those that never involved animals to begin with, like Ginkgo Biowork's fragrances.

=== Meat ===
Cultured meat is a meat produced by in vitro cell cultures of animal cells. It is a form of cellular agriculture being explored in the context of increased consumer demand for protein.

Cultured meat is produced using tissue engineering techniques traditionally used in regenerative medicines. The concept of cultured meat was introduced to wider audiences by Jason Matheny in the early 2000s after he co-authored a paper on cultured meat production and created New Harvest, the world's first nonprofit organization dedicated to in-vitro meat research.

Cultured meat may have the potential to address substantial global problems of the environmental impact of meat production, animal welfare, food security and human health. Specifically, it can be thought of in the context of the mitigation of climate change.

The Meat Revolution, a lecture at the World Economic Forum by Mark Post of the University of Maastricht about in vitro meat

A video by New Harvest and Xprize explaining the development of cultured meat and a "post-animal bio-economy" driven by lab-grown protein (meat, eggs, milk)

In 2013, professor Mark Post at Maastricht University pioneered a proof-of-concept for cultured meat by creating the first hamburger patty grown directly from cells. Since then, other cultured meat prototypes have gained media attention: SuperMeat opened a farm-to-fork restaurant called "The Chicken" in Tel Aviv to test consumer reaction to its "Chicken" burger, while the "world's first commercial sale of cell-cultured meat" occurred in December 2020 at the Singapore restaurant "1880", where cultured meat manufactured by the US firm Eat Just was sold.

While most efforts in the space focus on common meats such as pork, beef, and chicken which comprise the bulk of consumption in developed countries, some new companies such as Orbillion Bio have focused on high end or unusual meats including Elk, Lamb, Bison, and the prized Wagyu strain of beef. Avant Meats has brought cultured grouper fish to market as other companies have started to pursue cultivating additional fish species and other seafood.

The production process is constantly evolving, driven by multiple companies and research institutions. The applications of cultured meat have led to ethical, health, environmental, cultural, and economic discussions. In terms of market strength, data published by the non-governmental organization Good Food Institute found that in 2021 cultivated meat companies attracted $140 million in Europe alone.

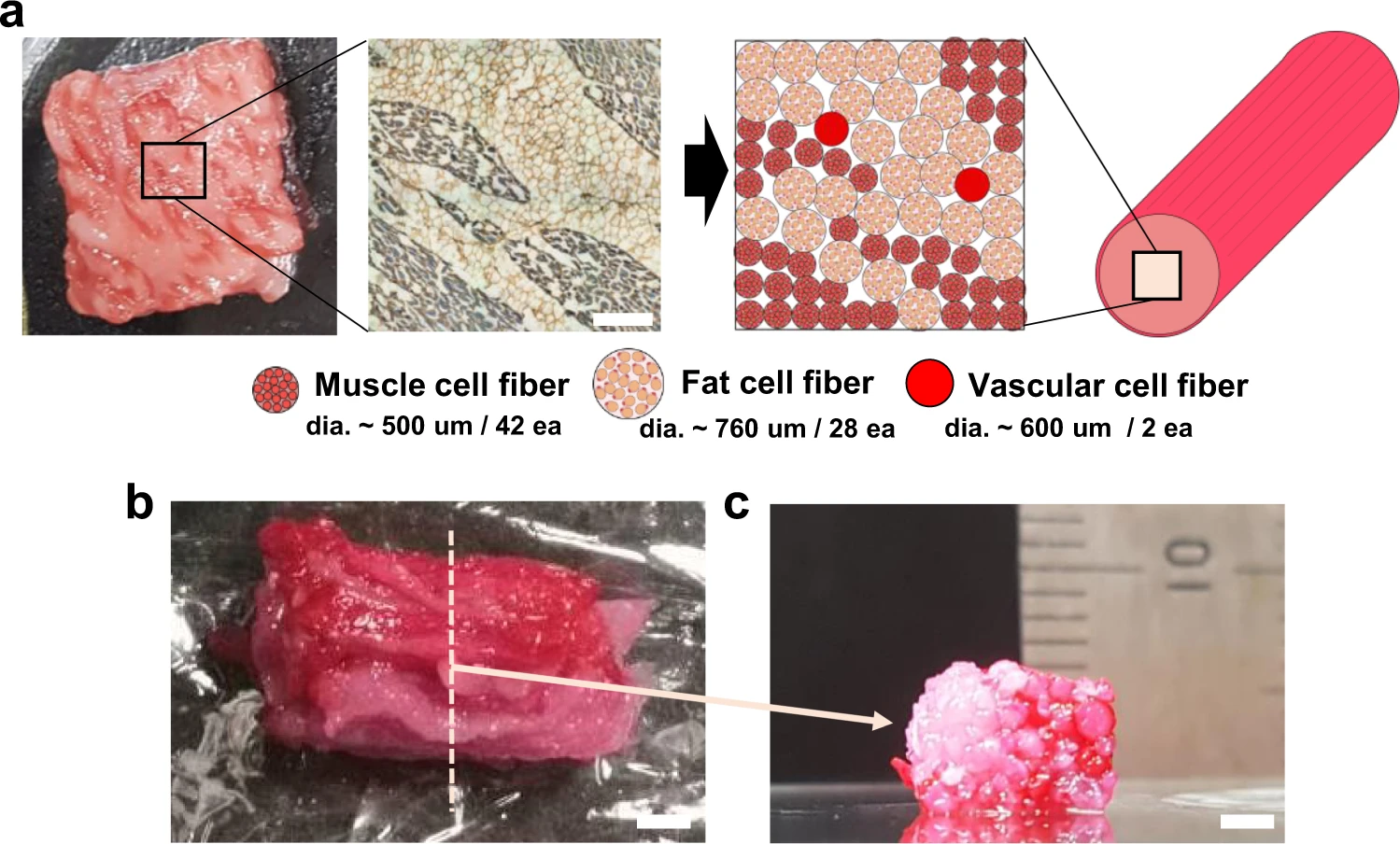
In 2021, researchers presented a bioprinting method to produce steak-like cultured meat.

In 2020, the world's first regulatory approval for a cultivated meat product was awarded by the Government of Singapore. The chicken meat was grown in a bioreactor in a fluid of amino acids, sugar, and salt. The chicken nuggets food products are ~70% lab-grown meat, while the remainder is made from mung bean proteins and other ingredients. The company pledged to strive for price parity with premium "restaurant" chicken servings.

In June 2023, the United States Department of Agriculture's Food Safety and Inspection Service issued grants of inspection to UPSIDE Foods and GOOD Meat, the final step in a joint FDA–USDA regulatory process that allowed the first sales of cell-cultivated chicken in the United States. The FDA had previously issued "no questions" letters to UPSIDE Foods in November 2022 and to GOOD Meat in March 2023. The products were first sold at restaurants in San Francisco and Washington, D.C., in July 2023.

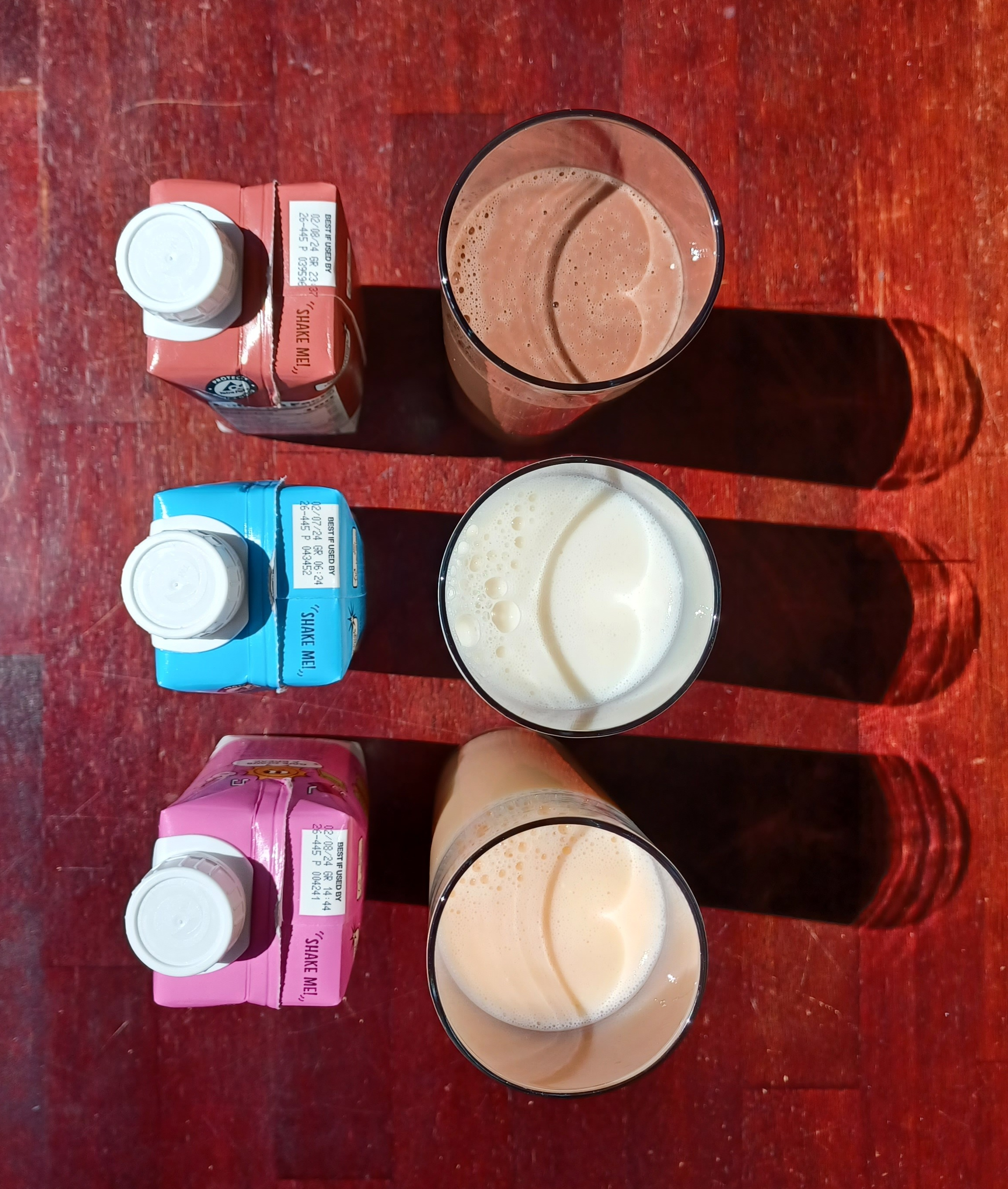
Three flavors of Bored Cow milk (chocolate, vanilla and strawberry) with whey protein produced by Perfect Day.

=== Dairy ===
- Perfect Day is a San Francisco-based startup that started as the New Harvest Dairy Project and was incubated by IndieBio in 2014. Perfect Day is making dairy from yeast instead of cows. The company changed its name from Muufri to Perfect Day in August 2016.
- New Culture is a San Francisco-based startup that was incubated by IndieBio in 2019. New Culture makes mozzarella cheese using casein protein (dairy protein) made by microbes instead of cows.
- Real Vegan Cheese based in the San Francisco Bay-area is a grass-roots, non-profit Open Science collective working out of two open community labs and was spun out of the International Genetically Engineered Machine (iGEM) competition in 2014. Real Vegan Cheese are making cheese using casein protein (dairy protein) made by microbes instead of cows.
- Formo, based in Germany, is a startup making dairy products using microbial precision fermentation.
- Imagindairy, based in Israel, is a startup attempting to create milk proteins from bioengineered yeast. In 2024 it had received FDA and Israeli Ministry of Health approval for its products.
- Remilk, based in Israel, is a startup attempting to create milk proteins from bioengineered yeast. In 2022 it received FDA approval for its products.
- Wilk, based in Israel, is a startup attempting to produce human mother milk ingredients using cells from breast reduction surgeries, to supplement infant formulas.
- NewMoo, based in Israel, is a startup attempting to create casein protein within the seeds of genetically modified plants.
- Real Deal Milk, based in Spain, is a startup attempting to create milk proteins from bioengineered microbes.
- Opalia, based in Canada, is a startup attempting to produce milk from cows' mammary cells.
- De Novo Foodlabs, based in Raleigh, North Carolina and Cape Town, South-Africa, is a startup producing nature-identical milk ingredients, such as lactoferrin, using precision fermentation.
- Cultivated Biosciences, based in Switzerland, is a startup attempting to produce fats from non-GMO yeast to make plant based milk more creamy.
- Naturopy, based in France, is a startup attempting to create milk proteins from bioengineered yeast.
- Strauss Group, a large food company in Israel, started selling CowFree - a line of vegan milk and cream cheese based on cow β-Lactoglobulin protein grown in bioengineered fungi cells, in September 2025.

=== Eggs ===
- The EVERY Company is a San Francisco-based startup that started as the New Harvest Egg Project and was incubated by IndieBio in 2015. The EVERY Company is making egg whites from yeast instead of eggs.

=== Gelatin and Collagen ===
- Geltor is a San Francisco-based startup that was incubated by IndieBio in 2015. Geltor is developing a proprietary protein production platform that uses bacteria and yeast to produce gelatin.

=== Coffee ===
In 2021, media outlets reported that the world's first synthetic coffee products have been created by two biotechnology companies awaiting regulatory approval for near-term commercialization. Such products – which can be produced via cellular agriculture in bioreactors and for which multiple companies' R&D have acquired substantial funding – may have equal or highly similar effects, composition and taste as natural products but use less water, generate less carbon emissions, require less labor and cause no deforestation. Cell-cultured coffee is a much more radical approach to the multiple challenges that traditional coffee is facing. While 100% coffee, cell-cultured coffee is cultivated in the lab from coffee cells to deliver, after drying, a powder that can be roasted and extracted.

=== Horseshoe crab blood ===
- Sothic Bioscience is a Cork-based startup incubated by IndieBio in 2015. Sothic Bioscience is building a platform for biosynthetic horseshoe crab blood production. Horseshoe crab blood contains limulus amebocyte lysate (LAL), which is the gold standard in validating medical equipment and medication.

=== Fish ===
Cellular agriculture could be used for commercial fish feed.

- Finless Foods is working to develop and mass manufacture marine animal food products.
- Wild Type is a San Francisco-based startup focused on creating cultured meat to address items such as climate change, food security, and health.

=== Fragrances ===
- Ginkgo Bioworks is a Boston-based organism design company culturing fragrances and designing custom microbes.

=== Silk ===
- Spiber is a Japan-based company decoding the gene responsible for the production of spidroin in spiders and then bioengineering bacteria with recombinant DNA to produce the protein, which they then spin into their artificial silk.
- Bolt Threads is a California-based company creating engineered silk fibers based on proteins found in spider silk that can be produced at commercial scale. Bolt examines the DNA of spiders and then replicates those genetic sequences in other ingredients to create a similar silk fiber. Bolt's silk is made primarily of sugar, water, salts, and yeast. Through a process called wet spinning, this liquid is spun into fiber, similar to the way fibers like acrylic and rayon are made.

=== Leather ===
- Modern Meadow is a Brooklyn-based startup growing collagen, a protein found in animal skin, to make biofabricated leather.

=== Pet food ===
- Clean Meat cluster lists Because Animals, Wild Earth and Bond Pet Foods as participants in developing pet foods that use cultured meat.

=== Wood ===
In 2022, scientists reported the first 3D-printed lab-grown wood. It is unclear if it can be used on a commercial scale (e.g. with sufficient production efficiency and quality).

== Issues ==
=== Degrowth, green growth and circular economy ===
The bioeconomy has largely been associated with visions of "green growth". A study found that a "circular bioeconomy" may be "necessary to build a carbon neutral future in line with the climate objectives of the Paris Agreement". However, some are concerned that with a focus or reliance on technological progress a fundamentally unsustainable socioeconomic model might be maintained rather than be changed. Some are concerned it that may not lead to an ecologization of the economy but to an economization of the biological, "the living" and caution that potentials of non-bio-based techniques to achieve greater sustainability need to be considered. A study found that the, as of 2019, current EU interpretation of the bioeconomy is "diametrically opposite to the original narrative of Baranoff and Georgescu-Roegen that told us that expanding the share of activities based on renewable resources in the economy would slow down economic growth and set strict limits on the overall expansion of the economy". Furthermore, some caution that "Silicon Valley and food corporations" could use bioeconomy technologies for greenwashing and monopoly-concentrations. The bioeconomy, its potentials, disruptive new modes of production and innovations may distract from the need for systemic structural socioeconomic changes and provide a false illusion of technocapitalist utopianism/optimism that suggests technological fixes may make it possible to sustain contemporary patterns and structures, pre-empting structural changes.

=== Unemployment and work reallocation ===
Many farmers depend on conventional methods of producing crops and many of them live in developing economies. Cellular agriculture for products such as synthetic coffee could, if the contemporary socioeconomic context (the socioeconomic system's mechanisms such as incentives and resource distribution mechanisms like markets) remains unaltered (e.g. in nature, purposes, scopes, limits and degrees), threaten their employment and livelihoods as well as the respective nation's economy and social stability. A study concluded that "given the expertise required and the high investment costs of the innovation, it seems unlikely that cultured meat immediately benefits the poor in developing countries" and emphasized that animal agriculture is often essential for the subsistence for farmers in poor countries. However, not only developing countries may be affected.

=== Patents, intellectual property and monopolies ===
Observers worry that the bioeconomy will become as opaque and free of accountability as the industry it attempts to replace, that is the current food system. The fear is that its core products will be mass-produced, nutritionally dubious meat sold at the homogeneous fast-food joints of the future.

The medical community has warned that gene patents can inhibit the practice of medicine and progress of science. This can also apply to other areas where patents and private intellectual property licenses are being used, often entirely preventing the use and continued development of knowledge and techniques for many years or decades. On the other hand, some worry that without intellectual property protection as the type of R&D-incentive, particularly to current degrees and extents, companies would no longer have the resources or motives/incentives to perform competitive, viable biotech research – as otherwise they may not be able to generate sufficient returns from initial R&D investment or less returns than from other expenditures that are possible. "Biopiracy" refers to "the use of intellectual property systems to legitimize the exclusive ownership and control over biological resources and biological products that have been used over centuries in non-industrialized cultures".

Rather than leading to sustainable, healthy, inexpensive, safe, accessible food being produced with little labor locally – after knowledge- and technology transfer and timely, efficient innovation – the bioeconomy may lead to aggressive monopoly-formation and exacerbated inequality. For instance, while production costs may be minimal, costs – including of medicine – may be high.

=== Innovation management, public spending and governance ===
It has been argued that public investment would be a tool governments should use to regulate and license cellular agriculture. Private firms and venture capital would likely seek to maximise investor value rather than social welfare. Moreover, radical innovation is considered to be more risky, "and likely involves more information asymmetry, so that private financial markets may imperfectly manage these frictions". Governments may also help to coordinate "since several innovators may be needed to push the knowledge frontier and make the market profitable, but no single company wants to make the early necessary investments". And investments in the relevant sectors seem to be a bottleneck hindering the transition toward a bioeconomy. Governments could also help innovators that lack the network "to naturally obtain the visibility and political influence necessary to obtain public funds" and could help determine relevant laws. By establishing supporting infrastructure for entrepreneurial ecosystems they can help creating a beneficial environment for innovative bioeconomy startups. Enabling such bioeconomy startups to act on the opportunities provided through the bioeconomy transformation further contributes to its success.

== Academic programs ==
=== New Harvest Cultured Tissue Fellowship at Tufts University ===
A joint program between New Harvest and the Tissue Engineering Research Center (TERC), an NIH-supported initiative established in 2004 to advance tissue engineering. The fellowship program offers funding for Masters and PhD students at Tufts university who are interested in bioengineering tunable structures, mechanics, and biology into 3D tissue systems related to their utility as foods.

== Conferences ==
=== New Harvest Conference ===
New Harvest brings together pioneers in the cellular agriculture and new, interested parties from industry and academia to share relevant learnings for cellular agriculture's path moving forward. The Conference has been held in San Francisco, California, Brooklyn, New York, and is currently held in Cambridge, Massachusetts.

=== Industrializing Cell-Based Meats & Seafood Summit ===
The 3rd Annual Industrializing Cell-Based Meats & Seafood Summit is the only industry-led forum uniting key decision-makers from biotech and food tech, leading food and meat companies, and investors to discuss key operational and technical challenges for the development of cell-based meats and seafood.

=== International Scientific Conference on Cultured Meat ===
The International Scientific Conference on Cultured Meat began in collaboration with Maastricht University in 2015, and brings together an international group of scientists and industry experts to present the latest research and developments in cultured meat. It takes place annually in Maastricht, The Netherlands.

=== Good Food Conference ===
The GFI conference is an event focused on accelerating the commercialization of plant-based and clean meat.

=== Cultured Meat Symposium ===
The Cultured Meat Symposium is a conference held in Silicon Valley highlighting top industry insights of the clean meat revolution.

=== Alternative Protein Show ===
The Alternative Protein Show is a "networking event" to facilitate collaboration in the "New Protein Landscape", which includes plant-based and cellular agriculture.

=== New Food Conference ===
The New Food Conference is an industry-oriented event that aims to accelerate and empower innovative alternatives to animal products by bringing together key stakeholders. It is Europe's first and biggest conference on new-protein solutions.

== In the media ==
=== Books ===
- Clean Meat: How Growing Meat Without Animals Will Revolutionize Dinner and the World is a book about cellular agriculture written by animal activist Paul Shapiro (author). The book reviews startup companies that are currently working towards mass-producing cellular agriculture products.
- Meat Planet: Artificial Flesh and the Future of Food by Benjamin Aldes Wurgaft is the result of five years researching cellular agriculture, and explores the quest to generate meat in the lab, asking what it means to imagine that this is the future of food. It is published by the University of California Press.
- Where do hot dogs come from? A Children's Book about Cellular Agriculture by Anita Broellochs, Alex Shirazi and Illustrated by Gabriel Gonzalez turns a family BBQ into a scientific story explaining how hot dogs are made with cellular agriculture technologies. The book was launched on Kickstarter on July 20, 2021.

=== Podcasts ===
- Cultured Meat and Future Food is a podcast about clean meat and future food technologies hosted by Alex Shirazi, a mobile User Experience Designer based in Menlo Park, California, whose current projects focus on retail technology. The podcast features interviews with industry professionals from startups, investors, and non-profits working on cellular agriculture.

== Similar fields of research and production ==
- Microbial food cultures and genetically engineered microbial production (e.g. of spider silk or solar-energy-based protein powder)
- Controlled self-assembly of plant proteins (e.g. of spider silk similar plant-proteins-based plastics alternatives)
- Cell-free artificial synthesis (see Biobased economy#Agriculture)
- Imitation foods (e.g. meat analogues and milk substitutes)
