= New Harvest =

Cellular agriculture research institute

- Formation: 2004
- Founder: Jason Matheny
- Legal status: 501(c)(3) nonprofit
- Purpose: Research Institute
- Executive Director: Isha Datar
- Board of directors: Scott Banister, Karien Bezuidenhout, Vince Sewalt, John Pattison, Andras Forgacs
- Website: www.new-harvest.org

New Harvest is a donor-funded research institute dedicated to the field of cellular agriculture, focusing on advances in scientific research efforts surrounding cultured animal products. Its research aims to resolve growing environmental and ethical concerns associated with industrial livestock production.

The 501(c)(3) nonprofit was established in 2004 and is the longest running cellular agriculture-based organization. New Harvest funds university-based research to develop breakthroughs in cellular agriculture, such as new culture media formulations, bioreactors, and methods of tissue assembly for the production of cultured meat. It also organizes annual conference where it connects scientists, entrepreneurs, and other interested parties in the biosciences and food security fields.

== History ==
A video by New Harvest and Xprize narrated by Isha Datar on the development of cultured meat and a "post-animal bio-economy" (meat, eggs, milk)

In 2004, New Harvest was co-founded by Johns Hopkins researcher Jason Matheny to fund academic research into the use of cell cultures, instead of live animals, to grow meat. Matheny became interested in cultured meat after researching infectious diseases (HIV prevention) in India for a master's degree in public health. In 2003, he toured a poultry farm outside Delhi where he saw "tens of thousands of chickens in a metal warehouse, doped with drugs, living in their own manure and being bred for production traits that caused them to be immune-compromised." He there recognized a need for a new way to satisfy a global demand for meat which, despite arguments against it, continues to grow even in a traditionally vegetarian country like India, where poultry consumption had doubled in the previous five years.

When Matheny returned to the States, he read about a NASA-funded project that "grew" goldfish meat to explore food possibilities for astronauts on long-range space missions. He contacted several of the cited authors and teamed up with three—a tissue engineer, cell biologist and animal scientist—to consider the viability of producing cultured meat on a large scale. In 2005, their research was published in the journal Tissue Engineering which generated considerable public and scientific interest in New Harvest. Despite many efforts in helping organize European conferences and events to raise awareness about cultured meat and attract investors, Matheny made little progress as he was running the organization alone. However, when Canadian molecular and cell biology student Isha Datar published a paper about the possibilities of cultured meat and sent it to him for feedback, Matheny hired her, and in 2012 appointed her as executive director of New Harvest.

After Datar's appointment, New Harvest's focus grew to include other animal commodities like milk and eggs, that could be produced by biotechnology rather than livestock. Since 2014, New Harvest has helped found two start-up companies—Perfect Day and The EVERY Company—created new grant programs, and shifted from their animal rights roots to a more sustainability-based outlook. Isha Datar coined the term "cellular agriculture" (often shortened to "cell ag") in a New Harvest Facebook group in 2015.

== Research ==
=== Fellowship Program ===
New Harvest's Fellowship Program funds graduate and postdoctoral Fellows participating in cellular agriculture research. Since its establishment in 2015, New Harvest Fellows spanning six countries have been responsible for most of the organization's research output. Projects have ranged from development of serum-free growth medium to bioreactor design to establishment of new cell lines. A number of New Harvest Fellows have been involved in the establishment of new cellular agriculture startups, such as Daan Luining and Mark Kotter who co-founded Meatable.

=== Seed Grant Program ===
Seed Grants are awarded by New Harvest to short-term cellular agriculture projects. Grantees are typically at the undergraduate level, with projects lasting three to six months. One example of a project it supported was the development of the world's first cultured hamburger by Mark Post's Maastricht University team.

=== Dissertation Award ===
Dissertation Awards are given by New Harvest to graduate students in their final year of study. New Harvest's first Dissertation Award was given to Mike McLellan in early 2020.

== Conference ==
The annual New Harvest Conference is the first and oldest cellular agriculture conference. It was first held in 2016 with the intention of bringing together the top innovators in cellular agriculture. Originally called Experience Cellular Agriculture and attended by primarily company founders, its audience has grown to include researchers, students, and investors as well. Conference speakers are largely drawn from the New Harvest Fellows, startup founders, and investment firms looking to branch into cellular agriculture, speaking on research advancements, industry challenges, and the progression of cellular agriculture. The New Harvest 2020 Conference was cancelled due to the COVID-19 pandemic.

- 2016: San Francisco, "Experience Cellular Agriculture"
- October 2017: Brooklyn, New York City
- 20–21 July 2018: Massachusetts Institute of Technology, in Cambridge, Massachusetts (near Boston)
- 19–20 July 2019: Massachusetts Institute of Technology, in Cambridge, Massachusetts (near Boston)
- 10–11 July 2019: Massachusetts Institute of Technology, in Cambridge, Massachusetts (near Boston) – cancelled due to COVID-19.

== Associated companies ==
=== Perfect Day ===
Isha Datar, Perumal Gandhi and Ryan Pandya (two New Harvest volunteers) founded Muufri in 2014 to produce an animal-free cow's milk via biotechnology. The start-up got seed funding from a synthetic biology accelerator program in Cork, Ireland. They tried to modify yeast to synthesize casein and whey, the two key proteins in milk. Six months into research, Muufri received a $2M investment from Li Ka-shing's VC – Horizons Ventures. Muufri has since re-branded to Perfect Day and has raised $61.5 million in VC funding since 2014.

=== The EVERY Company ===
In 2015 Isha Datar, David Anchel, and Arturo Elizondo founded Clara Foods (now The EVERY Company) to develop a chickenless egg white. The company participated in the Indie.Bio accelerator program in San Francisco, California.

== See also ==
- Good Food Institute
- Cellular agriculture
- Timeline of cellular agriculture
- Timeline of animal welfare and rights
