= Ilya Sheyman =

American activist (born 1986)

- Born: June 1, 1986 (age 39); Soviet Union
- Occupations: Organizer and strategist
- Title: CEO of The Good Food Institute United States
- Spouse: Sara Haghdoosti (m. 2015)

Ilya Sheyman (born June 1, 1986) is a community organizer, formerly Executive Director of MoveOn Political Action, a candidate for Illinois's 10th congressional district for the United States House of Representatives elections, 2012, and is currently United States CEO of The Good Food Institute.

== Life and work ==
Ilya Sheyman was born in the former Soviet Union and immigrated to the United States with his family at the age of four as Jewish refugees. He graduated from McGill University with a joint degree in Political Science and United States History.

In 2012, Sheyman ran for the Democratic nomination for Congress in Illinois's 10th Congressional District, coming in second in a four-way race. As the Chicago Sun Times described, "Sheyman did well—he gained 38.6 percent of the vote to Schneider’s 46.9 percent—demonstrating that there is a substantial progressive base vote in the district."

In his race, Sheyman was endorsed by former Vermont Governor and Democratic National Committee Chairman Howard Dean, former Senator Russ Feingold, Congressional Progressive Caucus co-chairs Representatives Raul Grijalva and Keith Ellison, and Representative Danny Davis. Other notable endorsers included Democracy for America, MoveOn.org, the Progressive Change Campaign Committee, the Sierra Club, the Council for a Livable World and Citizen Action/Illinois; AFSCME Council 31, the Illinois Federation of Teachers, Sheet Metal Workers Local 73, the United Steelworkers and the International Longshoremen's Association-AFL-CIO.

Previously, Ilya worked as an organizer for A+ Illinois, a statewide advocacy organization that worked to improve the quality and funding of public schools, for then-Senator Barack Obama as constituent services intern in veterans' and military affairs, as online organizing manager for TrueMajority.org/USAction, as the field director for Democracy for America and as National Mobilization Director for Moveon.org.

In 2013, Sheyman became Executive Director of MoveOn.org Political Action. Under his leadership, MoveOn.org launched a million dollar effort to draft Senator Elizabeth Warren to run for president, endorsed Senator Bernie Sanders for the Democratic Nomination and launched an unsuccessful multimillion-dollar United Against Hate campaign to defeat then-candidate Donald Trump.

Sheyman became president of The Good Food Institute U.S. branch on February 22, 2022 and United States CEO in October of the same year. On April 17, 2025, GFI announced that Sheyman would be departing the organization effective June 2, 2025 and that Jessica Almy would serve as interim CEO while the organization conducts a nationwide search for its next CEO.
