= From Fauna =

American cellular agriculture nonprofit

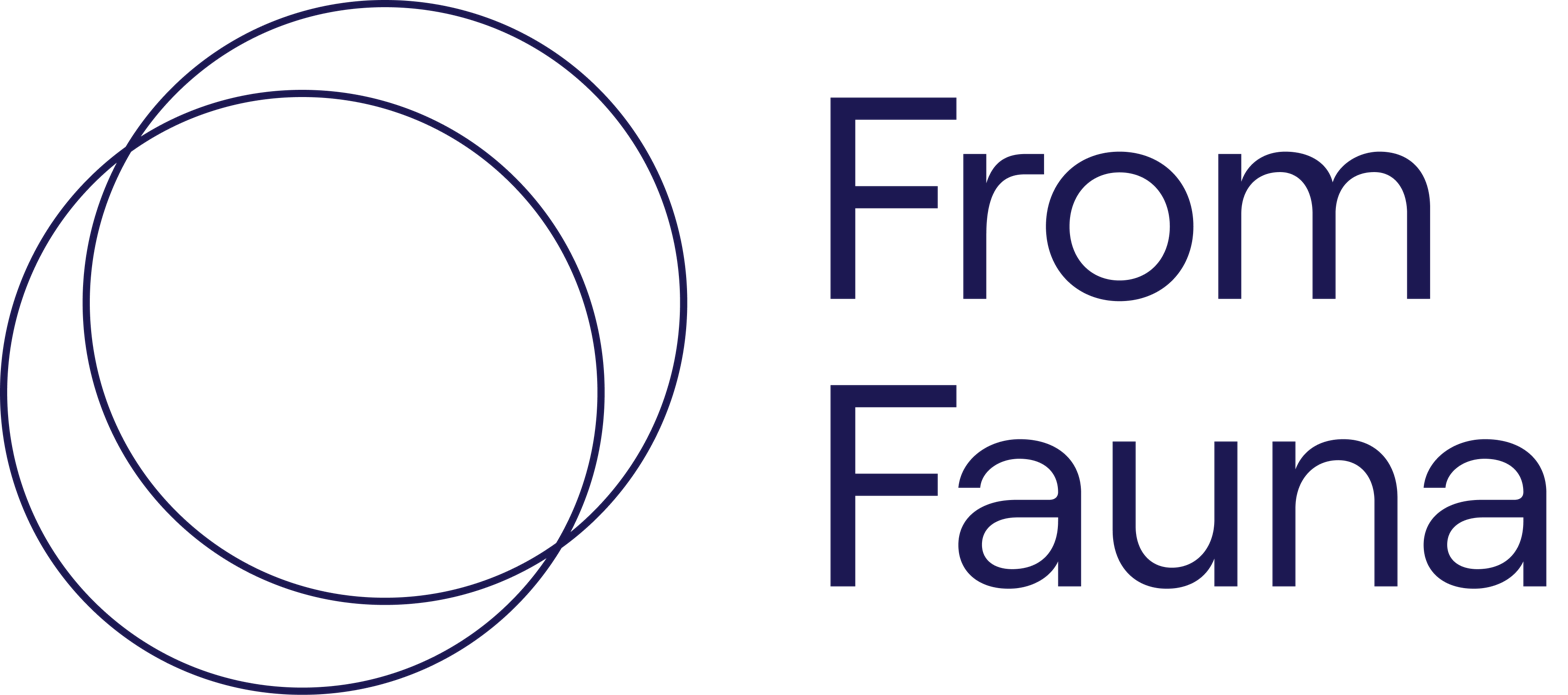
- Founder: Kris Spiros
- Headquarters: San Francisco, United States
- Website: https://fromfauna.org/
- Formerly called: Cellular Agriculture Society

From Fauna, formerly known as the Cellular Agriculture Society, is an international 501(c)(3) organization that has been involved in research, funding, advancement of, and most recently education in, cellular agriculture. It is based in San Francisco, and was founded by Kris Spiros (Note: Older sources refer to him by "Kristopher Gasteratos", his former name.) in the early 2010s.

== History ==
In 2019, the Cellular Agriculture Society released 90 Reasons to Consider Cellular Agriculture, a pamphlet made available by the Harvard and Stanford digital libraries.

In 2023, they released Modern Meat, a freely available 600-page textbook which was the first on the subject of cultured meat. They have also created children's books, educational simulations, social science research, and designed the theoretical workings and architecture of a cultured meat facility through Project CMF, which envisions what cultured meat production could look like in 2040.
