= Precision fermentation =

Biological manufacturing process

Precision fermentation is a production process in which specific biological molecules are manufactured using microorganisms. It can be used to produce food ingredients that are conventionally sourced from animals and plants, including proteins, lipids, carbohydrates, and other metabolites. Bacteria, yeast, or other cell types produce large quantities of a specific compound which is then extracted and purified from the fermentation broth or cell lysate. For example, milk or egg proteins, dairy fats, functional oligosaccharides, flavour and colour compounds or vitamins.

Precision fermentation is different from other forms of fermentation used in the food industry because it produces a single target molecule with high precision and purity. In other approaches like traditional fermentation or biomass fermentation, the product contains a mix of fermentation outputs, biomass, and substrates. This precision is achieved by optimising both the culture conditions and the microbial strains used in the process. While it is possible to use organisms that naturally produce useful ingredients, in some cases engineered strains are developed using adaptive laboratory evolution, mutagenesis, or by introducing specific gene sequences. The purification and extraction process ensures that genetically engineered organisms are not present in any final products.

Although the term "precision fermentation" is relatively new, the underlying technologies have been used since the 1980s. Proteins like insulin for diabetes treatment or chymosin (rennet) for cheese manufacturing have been produced by these techniques for decades and are well integrated in the market. Precision fermentation incorporates genetic tools, synthetic biology approaches and strain engineering techniques, and it has a promising role in future biobased food production systems. It is expected to become an essential technology in a global shift towards more sustainable food systems, in the context of climate change and in areas where the availability of agricultural land is limited.

== Principles of precision fermentation ==
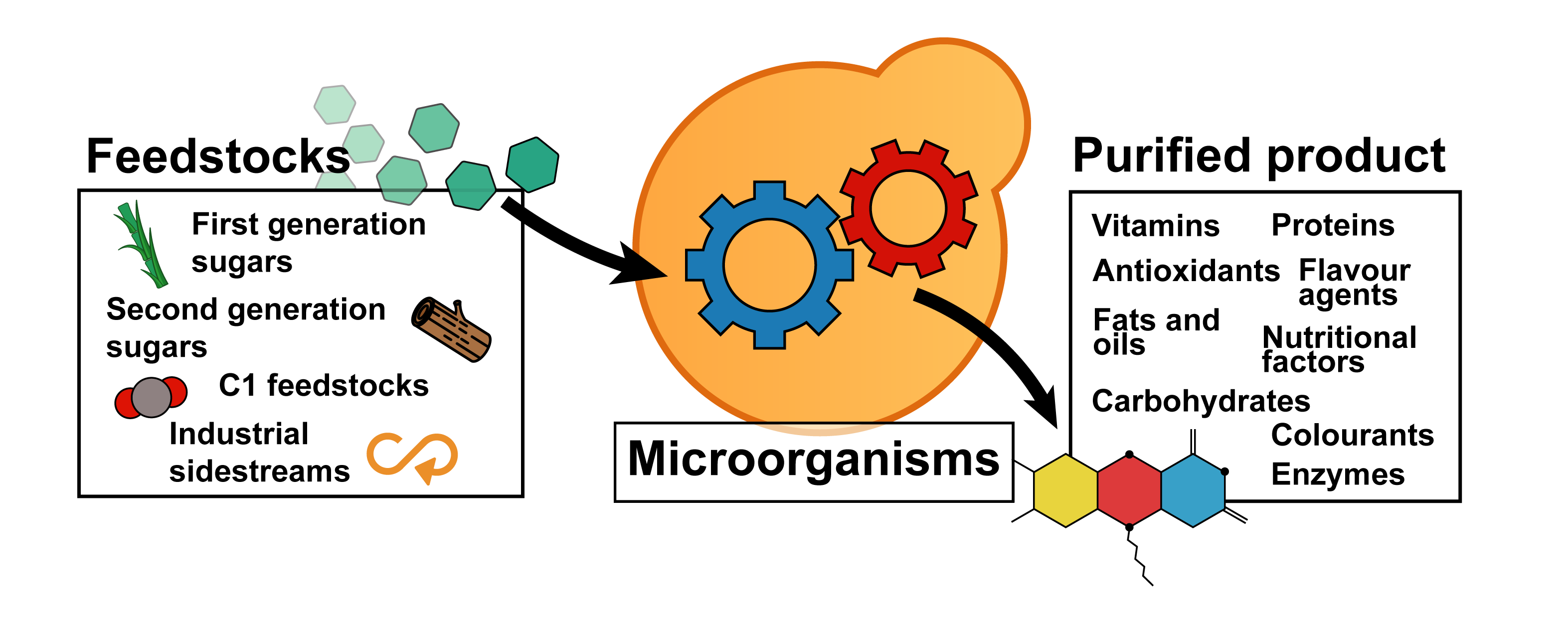
In precision fermentation, microbial cell factories transform feedstocks into specific biological products.

A fermentation bioprocess encompasses all the steps necessary to transform a raw feedstock into the desired molecule of interest, including the choice of the microbial strain that will be performing the transformation and the conditions in which it will be growing.

=== Feedstocks ===
Feedstocks generally refer to the predominant raw materials used as a source of carbon, nitrogen, and energy for microorganisms to grow and produce end products. The choice of feedstocks for precision fermentation is critical, as it significantly impacts the cost and sustainability of the products.

- First generation sugars. Currently, the majority of precision fermentation processes are conducted using refined glucose derived from food crops. These sugars support robust microbial growth and are safe for use in food production; however, they have drawbacks such as higher costs and competition with the food supply.
- Second generation sugars. These are fermentable sugars obtained from non-food, lignocellulosic biomass (plant dry matter) such as agricultural residues. This reduces competition with food production and improves the sustainability of fermentation-based products.
- C1 feedstocks. Carbon dioxide, methane, formate, and methanol are considered highly sustainable for microbial growth and product synthesis, as they help minimise environmental impact. Although significant achievements have been made in this field, major challenges still remain for the effective utilisation of C1 feedstocks in mainstream manufacturing processes.
- Food industry sidestreams. Food manufacturing wastewaters or byproducts from food processing can be used as inexpensive feedstocks in a circular bioeconomy approach and can be converted into fermentable sugars to serve as substrates for precision fermentation.

=== Cell factories ===
A cell factory is a biological system (microorganisms, plant cells, or mammalian cells) that transform substrates into high-value biological products, such as proteins, enzymes, vitamins, pharmaceuticals and biomaterials under controlled conditions. Microbial strains commonly used include Bacillus subtilis, Corynebacterium glutamicum, Escherichia coli, Komagataella phaffii, Saccharomyces cerevisiae, and Yarrowia lipolytica. Each of these hosts possesses unique genetic and metabolic characteristics that make them suitable for defined production purposes in precision fermentation. The selection of a microbial host is based on various factors, including the presence of native biosynthetic pathways for the desired product, the capacity for efficient expression of heterologous pathways, the safety profile of the organism, and its compatibility with different cultivation conditions.

- B. subtilis is a widely studied Gram-positive bacterium, known as a plant growth-promoting rhizobacterium. It can adapt to harsh growth conditions, make use of low-cost substrates, grow rapidly, and possesses good genetic stability along with advantages in expression systems. B. subtilis is considered safe (GRAS) and can be used to produce a variety of biomolecules.
- C. glutamicum is a fast-growing, facultative aerobic, Gram-positive bacterium. It can utilize a variety of sugars, organic acids, and alcohols as sole or mixed carbon sources. Known for its excellent amino acid production capabilities, C. glutamicum is also used in the industrial production of other high-value compounds, including organic acids and terpenoids.
- E. coli is a rod-shaped Gram-negative bacterium. A widespread and non-pathogenic strain of this bacterium a commonly used host strain to produce various valuable products. This expression system has the advantages of convenient genetic manipulation, simple transformation process, low cost, and efficient production.
- K. phaffii (formerly Pichia pastoris) is a non-conventional yeast with advantages in natural product biosynthesis. It is easier to genetically modify and is well-suited for protein expression.
- S. cerevisiae exhibits rapid growth kinetics, high product yields, and good tolerance to environmental stresses such as low pH and oxygen limitation. Its GRAS status and the availability of advanced genetic tools make it valuable for industrial applications.
- Y. lipolytica is a non-conventional, oleaginous yeast species. It can metabolise a wide range of substrates and shows strong environmental adaptability. It is regarded as a promising host for the production of proteins, lipids, flavour compounds, and pigments.

=== Metabolic engineering ===
Microbial strains often undergo a process of engineering and optimisation to improve the production of a target molecule. Metabolic engineering encompasses a range of strategies to study and optimise the biochemical reactions happening in the cell to increase the synthesis rate of a specific molecule.

Typically, the target molecule will be a lipid, carbohydrate or other metabolites that is synthesised inside the cell following a succession of enzymatic reactions. These sequentially transform the molecules obtained from the feedstock into the product of interest through a series of intermediate compounds. This may involve reactions and intermediates that are natively part of the host's metabolism, or heterologous enzymes from other organisms. Metabolic engineering designs modifications both in the native metabolic network and in heterologous reactions that maximise product synthesis. For example, in order to increase metabolic flux towards the desired product and reduce the formation of undesired by-products, key enzymes in the host's metabolism can be up-regulated, down-regulated or knocked out. Synthetic biology provides tools to fine-tune expression levels, such as libraries of promoters of different strengths. Computational and mathematical methods are used to model the metabolic network across the cell and predict the effect of these modifications.

In some cases, the target molecule is a protein itself. In that case, genetic strategies are often used to ensure it is expressed at high levels, which may involve the use of strong promoters, or timing the expression with an inducible promoter. Strategies may also be used to force this protein to be secreted outside the cell, facilitating its recovery.

=== Process optimisation ===
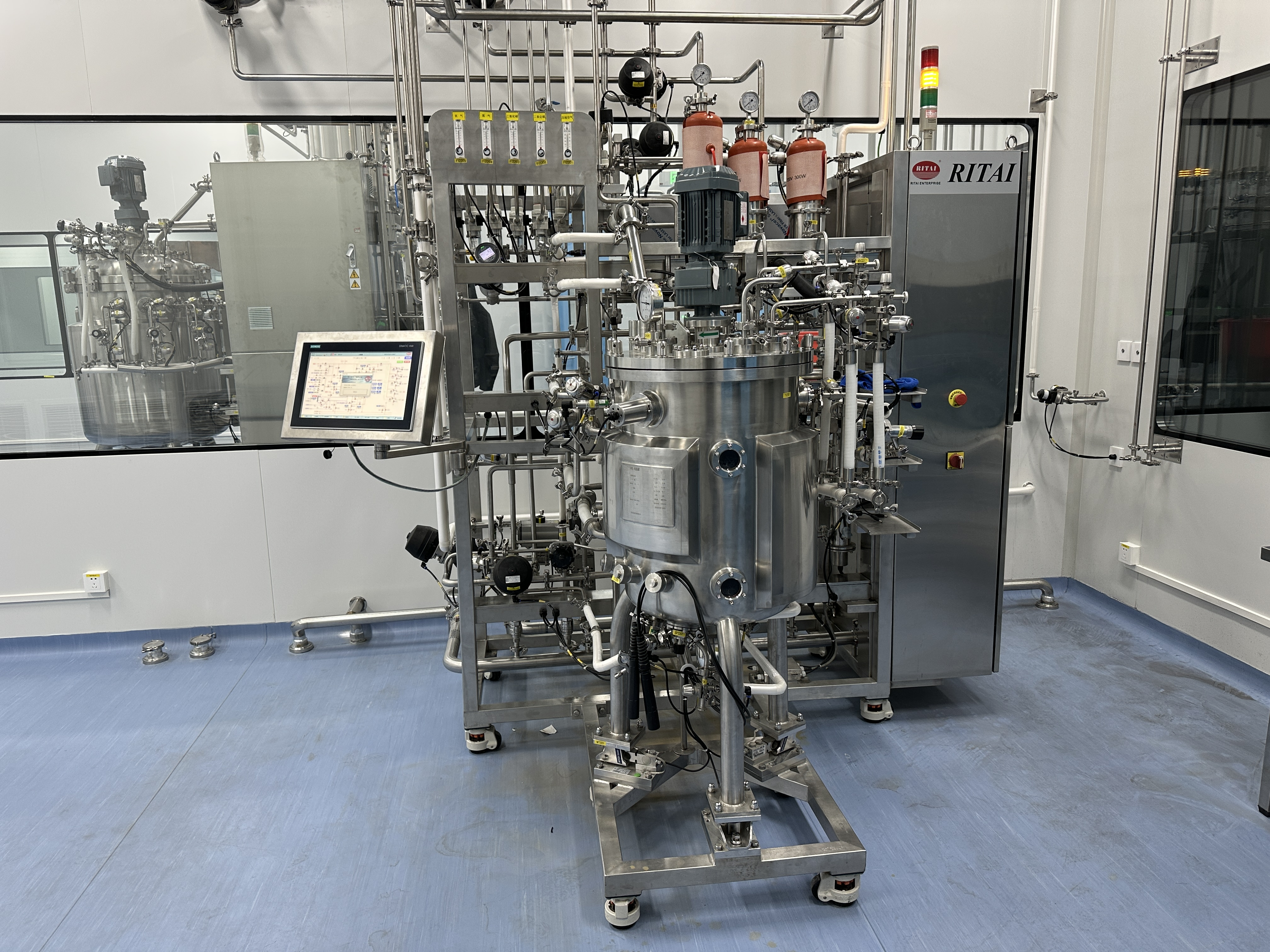
Bioreactors are used to grow microorganisms at large scale in industrial setups.

Process optimisation in precision fermentation aims to improve productivity, sustainability, and efficiency of producing target compounds. This targets various aspects of the fermentation process, such as the culture medium, feeding strategy, bioreactor, and the fermentation conditions.

The composition of the culture medium plays a critical role in process optimisation. Culture media typically consist of a carbon source, a nitrogen source, minerals, and water. Depending on the characteristics of the cell factory, additional nutrients such as growth factors and vitamins may be required to support optimal production. Alternative carbon sources can be derived from agricultural by-products or industrial residues, which can be used as substrates for cell factories to convert waste into high-value products.

Feeding strategies include batch, fed batch, and continuous modes. Each has its own advantages and limitations. Selecting the appropriate feeding mode based on the characteristics of the fermentation product can improve production efficiency.

Different bioreactors, such as stirred tank, airlift, wave, and membrane types, have different features related to mixing, oxygen transfer, shear stress, scalability, and cost. Selecting a suitable bioreactor based on cell type and product needs is key to efficient and stable production.

Fermentation conditions such as pH, temperature, agitation, aeration rate, inoculum size and age, can be improved during the production process. With the development of AI, predictive models can be established to optimise and control these parameters, thereby simplifying the precision fermentation process, improving efficiency, and reducing manual intervention.

== Food applications ==
=== Vitamins, antioxidants and other nutritional factors ===
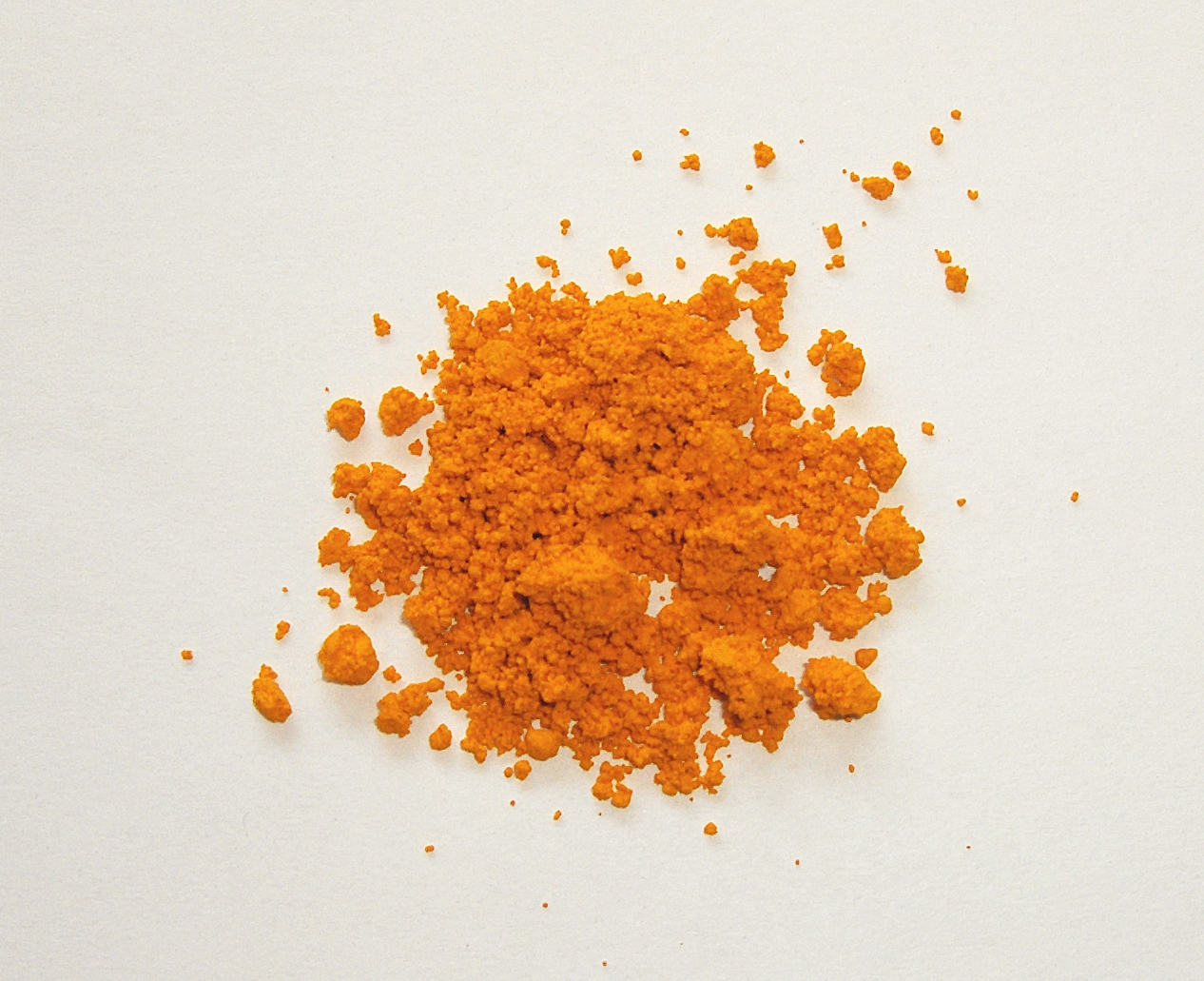
Vitamin B2 is industrially produced by precision fermentation.

Vitamins, antioxidants, and other nutritional factors have been produced by microbial cell factories. In some cases, such as vitamin B2, precision fermentation is the preferred method for large-scale industrial production and is widely adopted by manufacturers. The production of other compounds have so far only been produced at small scale or at low titres, or only reported in the scientific literature, and process optimisation is still needed for them to compete with other synthesis methods at an industrial scale.

- Astaxanthin is an orange-red ketone carotenoid with antioxidant and anti-inflammatory properties, playing an important role in the prevention of chronic diseases such as hypertension, hyperglycemia, and hyperlipidemia. E. coli, Y. lipolytica, and S. cerevisiae have been used as ideal production platforms for astaxanthin.
- Kaempferol and quercetin are derivatives of naringenin and have antioxidant, antihypertensive, anti-inflammatory, anticancer, neuroprotective, hepatoprotective, and tissue repair properties. The biosynthesis of kaempferol and quercetin has been achieved in S. cerevisiae, Y. lipolytica, Streptomyces, and E. coli.
- Polyunsaturated fatty acids (PUFAs), such as EPA and DHA, are essential for maintaining human health and play a key role in the prevention of cardiovascular diseases and the promotion of brain development. E. coli,Y. lipolytica, C. reinhardtii, and Aurantiochytrium have been used for PUFAs production.
- Resveratrol is an antioxidant abundantly found in plants such as grapes and peanuts. Due to its antioxidant, cardioprotective, anti-inflammatory, neuroprotective, anti-aging, and anticancer properties, it is widely used in the food, cosmetics, supplement, and pharmaceutical industries. E. coli, Y. lipolytica, and S. cerevisiae has been used for resveratrol production.
- Vitamin A is a fat-soluble vitamin essential for normal growth, development, and metabolism in humans. Researchers have successfully constructed biosynthetic pathways for vitamin A production in various host cells, including E. coli, Y. lipolytica, and S. cerevisiae.
- Vitamin B5, also known as D-pantothenic acid (D-PA), is an essential micronutrient required for normal physiological functions in living organisms. E. coli and C. glutamicum are considered the most promising microorganisms for D-PA production.
- Vitamin B2, riboflavin, is industrially produced as a human dietary supplement, but also as an additive for animal feeding and as yellow colouring E-101 for beverages. Precision fermentation production is well established and has currently replaced chemical synthesis methods at an industrial scale. It is produced by engineered strains of A. gossypii, and B. subtilis.
- Vitamin B12, also known as cobalamin, is an essential vitamin for humans that cannot be synthesized by the body and must be obtained from the diet. A yield of 21.09 mg/L of vitamin B12 has been achieved using engineered E. coli.
- Vitamin C, also known as L-ascorbic acid (LAA), is an important cofactor in various enzymatic reactions in the body. A biosynthetic pathway for vitamin C production has been constructed in S. cerevisiae.
- Vitamin D is an important human hormone that mainly helps the intestine absorb calcium and phosphate. S. cerevisiae has been used for vitamin D production.
- Vitamin E, composed of tocopherols and tocotrienols, is an important antioxidant. It has been biosynthesised in plants and microorganisms.

=== Colourants and flavour agents ===
Microbial pigments and flavours produced by bacteria, fungi, yeast, and microalgae have gained extensive interest as sustainable alternatives for synthetic or plant-extracted dyes and flavours in various industries.

- Carotenoids: A large group of yellow-orange pigments with antioxidant properties with wide applications in food and beverages, cosmetic, and pharmaceuticals industries. Some examples already produced through precision fermentation include β-carotene, zeaxanthin and crocetin, lycopene, astaxanthin and canthaxanthin, and lutein.
- Heme: A key component responsible for the red colour and flavour of meat and a source of iron, increasingly used in cultivated meat and plant-based meat alternatives.
- Indigo: Blue pigment and a sustainable alternative for synthetic dyes in textiles or electronics.
- Limonene: A fragrant compound found in citrus fruits.
- Linalool: A compound with lavender-like aroma and is found in over 200 plant species.
- Methyl anthranilate: A compound with a grape-like scent and flavour.
- Nerol: A compound with floral-citrus aroma found in plant essential oils.
- Phycocyanin: Blue pigment with antioxidant, anti-inflammatory, and immune-boosting properties used widely in foods and dietary supplements.
- Prodigiosin: Red pigment used as an antimicrobial and anticancer agent.
- Raspberry ketone: A flavour compound responsible for the aroma of red raspberries, cranberries, blackberries, peaches, etc.
- Riboflavin (Vitamin B2): A yellow pigment vital for various body functions and widely used in dietary supplements, energy drinks, and animal feed.
- Vanillin: A compound that is the primary flavouring component of vanilla beans.
- Violacein: Purple pigment with antibacterial and antifungal properties.

=== Sustainable ingredients ===
Sustainable food ingredients produced through precision fermentation include carbohydrates, proteins, and fats.

==== Alternative protein ====
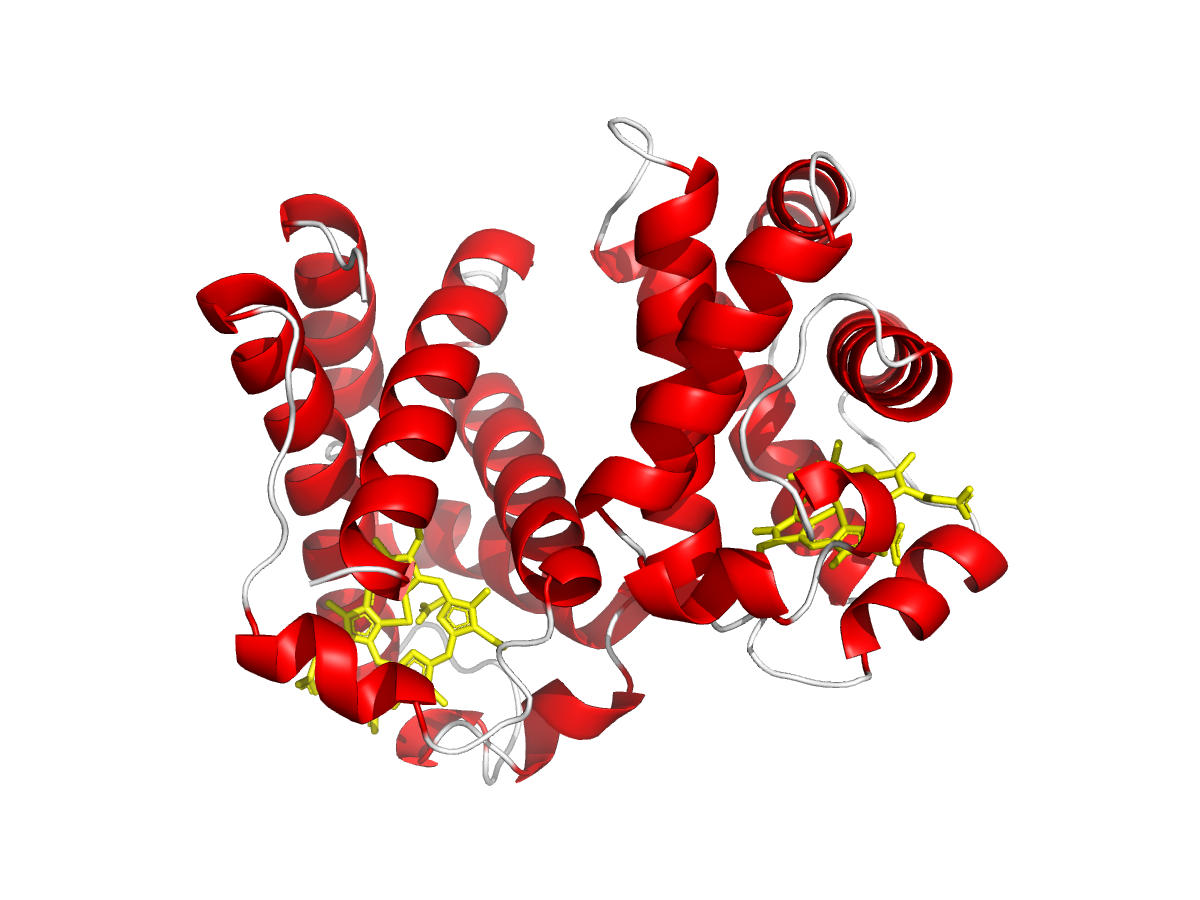
Leghemoglobin A from soybean.

With the continuous growth of the global population, finding high-quality alternative protein sources has become increasingly important. According to the Good Food Institute (GFI), alternative proteins can be derived from plants, cultivated animal cells, and fermentation. Producing alternative proteins through precision fermentation provides a low-carbon, sustainable, and efficient solution. Casein, lactoferrin, lactalbumin, lactoglobulin, and ovalbumin have been successfully produced through precision fermentation and are widely applied in the food industry.

Dairy proteins such as casein and whey proteins have been produced by several start-ups in the field for use in milk, yogurt, cream cheese, and ice cream. Other companies produce human milk proteins through precision fermentation, focusing on the immune benefits of these. Egg white proteins are also produced in microbial cell factories, providing an alternative for use in foods, beverages, alternative meats, and baking. Notably, Impossible Foods uses soy-based leghemoglobin to enhance the flavour and appearance of plant-based meat products, including the Impossible™ Burger.

==== Carbohydrates ====
Oligosaccharides such as fructooligosaccharides (FOS), galactooligosaccharides (GOS), and human milk oligosaccharides (HMOs) can promote gut health and improve infant formula. Fermented sugar alcohols such as erythritol and xylitol can be used as zero-calorie sweeteners in the production of functional foods. They have been produced using engineered yeast or E. coli.

==== Fats ====
Docosahexaenoic acid (DHA) and omega-3 fatty acids are essential for brain development and eye health, commonly used in maternal and infant formulas as well as nutritional supplements. Eicosapentaenoic acid (EPA) provides anti-inflammatory and cardiovascular protective benefits and is used in functional oils and health products. Human milk fat has a unique stereoisomeric structure that enables more efficient nutrient absorption in infants. Engineered Y. lipolytica has been used to produce human milk fat substitutes for use in improving infant formula.

==== Enzymes ====
Enzymes produced through precision fermentation play a key role in food processing, enhancing nutrition, improving texture and taste, and extending shelf life.

- Lipases can be used for fat hydrolysis or interesterification reactions, enabling cheese ripening, flavour enhancement, and the production of margarine.
- Proteases hydrolyse proteins to tenderise meat, enhance the flavour of sauces, and improve digestibility.
- Amylases hydrolyse starch into sugars, contributing to bread softness and moisture retention, as well as playing important roles in brewing and saccharification.
- Cellulases break down plant fibres, aiding in juice extraction, fruit and vegetable processing, and dietary fibre modification.
- Pectinases break down pectin, helping to clarify fruit juice and increase juice yield.
- Glucanases break down β-glucans, aiding in beer brewing and improving the digestibility of cereals.
- Transglutaminase catalyses protein cross-linking, improving structure. It can be used in meat binding, plant-based meat products, and dough modification.
- Glucose oxidase oxidises glucose to produce hydrogen peroxide, helping prevent mould in bread, stabilise protein foams, and extend shelf life.

== Non-food applications ==
=== Biofuels ===
Biofuels generated through precision fermentation using renewable feedstocks offer a sustainable alternative to fossil fuels. Examples include alcohol-based biofuels (butanol, isobutanol, and isopropanol), hydrocarbon-based biofuels (alkanes, alkenes, biodiesel, and fatty acid ethyl esters), gaseous biofuels (hydrogen and methane), and advanced biofuels such as jet fuels.

=== Biomaterials ===
A wide range of sustainable biomaterials has been manufactured using engineered microorganisms, with wide applications in textiles, packaging, cosmetics, and medical devices. Key examples include biodegradable plastics, collagen and gelatine alternatives, spider silk proteins, microbial cellulose, and coatings.

=== Chemicals ===
Various types of industrial chemicals produced through precision fermentation include solvents (acetone and isopropanol), monomers for polymers and resins (1,3-propanediol and 1,4-butanediol), precursors for biodegradable plastics and specialty chemicals (lactic acid, succinic acid and itaconic acid), production of bio-based polyamides (1,5-pentanediamine). Production of bulk chemicals for industrial applications provides sustainable alternatives to traditional chemical synthesis, reducing environmental impacts.

=== Pharmaceuticals ===
Precision fermentation enables the efficient and scalable production of animal-based pharmaceutical such as insulin, vaccines, antibodies, and recombinant proteins without relying on animal agriculture. Additionally, production of plant-derived pharmaceuticals such as alkaloids, or cannabinoids, antimicrobials can be achieved through precision fermentation, minimising the land and water use and environmental impact. Precision fermentation can also be considered as a sustainable method for the de novo biosynthesis of certain pharmaceuticals that are conventionally produced through chemical synthesis. Some examples include taxol, anti-malarial drugs such as artemisinin, or lanthipeptides.

== Economic and environmental considerations ==
Microbial products synthesised through precision fermentation hold the potential to significantly reduce the environmental impact of industrial, agricultural, and waste management sectors.

Microbial products, such as alternative proteins, are eco-friendly substitutes for animal-based proteins produced through animal agriculture, a sector that accounts for 20% of global greenhouse gas emissions. Furthermore, production of various compounds of industrial interests such as biomaterials, pharmaceuticals or biofuels using microorganisms as alternatives for fossil-based compounds could reduce the emissions through chemical synthesis. Moreover, engineering microorganisms for the production of high-value products using greenhouse gases such as methane and carbon dioxide is a breakthrough.

Furthermore, high-value microbial products produced using agro-industrial wastes through a circular bioeconomy approach could reduce the environmental pollutants and toxic compounds released into the environment. Microbial products can also minimise freshwater usage by replacing many products generated in the agricultural sector, which is the largest user of freshwater, comprising 70% of global usage. Microbial products produced in bioreactors require significantly less land and could reduce reliance on land for animal agriculture and farming. The freed-up land could be used for reforestation, increasing biodiversity, and could reduce countries' reliance on imports of animal feed.

=== Environmental considerations ===
While precision fermentation is widely recognised to reduce environmental impacts compared to agricultural-based or fossil-based products, addressing some environmental concerns will be crucial for maximising its potential as a transformative technology.

Precision fermentation requires significant energy inputs for heating, cooling, agitation, and downstream processing. Some strategies to make the process energy-efficient include: i) integration with renewable energy facilities onsite, ii) bioprocess optimisation by optimising the fermentation parameters (dissolved oxygen and pH levels, temperature, etc.) to provide the conditions for microbial growth and bioproduction, reducing fermentation time and subsequently energy use, iii) designing better microbial cell factories for consolidated bioprocessing at low temperatures, with less oxygen demand, or yielding higher purity products, thereby reducing the energy needed for heating, aeration, or downstream purification, respectively.

A critical environmental consideration in precision fermentation is the type and origin of feedstocks being used for microbial growth and bioproduction. Currently, many microbial products rely on sugars derived from sugar cane or corn. This could diminish the environmental benefits of precision fermentation due to the significant water and land use, competition with food production, and demand for fertilisers and pesticides that might affect the environmental footprint of fermentation-based products. To address these challenges, industry needs to adopt non-food and more sustainable alternatives such as food waste, lignocellulosic biomass, and industrial gases such as carbon dioxide. Fermentation also generates waste streams which contain organic matter and needs to be processed in accordance with environmental regulations.

=== Economic considerations ===
The demand for sustainable, animal-free foods and products as well as reducing the environmental impact across various industries has driven the rapid expansion of the precision fermentation market from $2.1 billion in 2023 to projections of over $100 billion by 2034. To reduce the cost for precision fermentation products: i) maximising the titre, yield, and productivity through metabolic engineering, ii) use of low-cost feedstocks, iii) efficient recovery and purification of target products to reduce the operational costs.

== Regulatory status ==
Despite the term "precision fermentation" having emerged only recently, the technologies that are behind it have been used for decades. As of 2024, there was no official or legal definition of "precision fermentation" in any country or jurisdiction, and no specific regulatory framework. This means that products derived from precision fermentation are regulated depending on their nature and application, using existing regulatory frameworks in different areas.

In the United States, several precision-fermented food ingredients have been assessed under the GRAS (Generally Recognized as Safe) framework. Chymosin produced via a genetically engineered microorganism was the first genetically engineered food product to receive GRAS status, in 1990. In 2020, the FDA issued a GRAS "no questions" letter for β-lactoglobulin (whey protein) produced by fermentation of Trichoderma reesei, submitted by Perfect Day, Inc.

In some jurisdictions, products made using precision fermentation may be considered "novel foods." Where such classifications apply, these products could fall under specific approval processes different from those for conventional foods. Precision fermentation can use genetically modified microorganisms during production, but these organisms are often not present in the final food product. Nonetheless, their use may trigger GMO-related regulatory requirements in regions with rules governing genetically modified inputs in food manufacturing. Both in the US and the European Union, food products that are produced with genetically modified microorganisms but do not contain any DNA do not need to be characterised as genetically modified for labelling purposes.

Precision fermentation products are already in the market in many countries. Some have been commercialised for many years, like vitamins, colourings and food enzymes. For example, precision fermentation-produced chymosin account for more than 90% of the global market for rennet in cheesemaking. Novel precision fermentation products like human-identical milk oligosaccharides, soy leghemoglobin or whey protein have been introduced in the market more recently in some countries.

== Future perspectives in precision fermentation ==
Precision fermentation is pushing the boundaries of biotechnology, offering a sustainable biomanufacturing approach across various industrial sectors. Expansion in new areas such as alternative proteins and microbial foods are expected to see robust growth, driven by growing consumer preference for natural, organic, and sustainable products and the investment by governments and private sectors on research and innovation in these field. Recent examples include the UKRI Engineering Biology Mission Hub on Microbial Food in the United Kingdom, the Centre for Precision fermentation and Sustainability (PreFerS) in Singapore/US, and the three Bezos Centres for Sustainable Protein at Imperial College London, NC State University, and National University of Singapore. These advancements have been accelerated by the emergence of AI-assisted innovations in microbial design and engineering and process optimisation.
