= Arturo Elizondo =

Hispanic entrepreneur

Arturo Elizondo is a Hispanic technological entrepreneur, food inventor, and the co-founder and CEO of the EVERY Company, known for generating the world's first egg protein without the need of using animals.

== Early life and education ==
Elizondo grew up in Laredo, Texas and went to United High School, during which he interned for Henry Cuellar, representative for Texas, as a junior. The following summer he interned at the Department of Agriculture in Washington D.C. During his time in Harvard University, he earned a degree in Government and Comparative politics. Elizondo was also involved in the Harvard Square Homeless Shelter, and aided Harvard immigrant employees and Latin students by helping them prepare for citizenship tests and create the first Latino organization at Harvard University. He interned in Washington at the Supreme Court under Sonia Sotomayor after his graduation in 2014. He was then able to work with the Department of Homeland Security under the Obama Administration.

== Career and achievements ==
Elizondo is the co-founder and CEO of the EVERY Company, formally known as Clara Foods, which is based in Silicon Valley, Northern California.

Elizondo received recognition from several news publications for Clara Food's innovation in generating the world's first egg protein without the need of using animals. In 2019, he was awarded Person of the Year by the National Hispanic Institute (NHI). Elizondo was included in the "30 Under 30 Advancing Science" list for Forbes Magazine in 2020. He has also been mentioned in multiple other articles such as "America's 50 Greatest Disruptors" by Newsweek, "Ten innovators to Watch" by Smithsonian Magazine, "10 Latinos Who Inspire the United States" by BBC World News, and "40 Under 40" by the San Francisco Business Times. His achievements gained attention from actress Anne Hathaway who invested in the EVERY Company.

On April 22, 2022, he was awarded “The Key to the City” one of the highest honors of his hometown, Laredo, Texas. The ceremony was held at City Hall Council Chambers and was broadcast by the Laredo Morning Times where family members, and notable people of the Laredo city attended the event.

In 2023, Elizondo became a candidate for Harvard University's Board of Overseers. This role is responsible for developing and representing nominees for the Harvard Board of Overseers and for the Elected Directors of the Harvard Alumni Association Board Committee (HAA). There were 8 other nominees and only 5 vacancies. Elizondo was not selected to fulfill this role.

== The EVERY Company ==
The U.S. Food & Drug Administration (FDA) completed their evaluation on Clara Food in 2021, and once again in 2022 to update contact information and make clarifications on the identity, method, dietary exposure, allergenic risks, and other mandatory food procedures done by the FDA before releasing a new product to the general public. In 2023, after Clara Foods started to emerge into its new identity The Every Company, the FDA re-evaluated the company and concluded that the production of egg-white protein is safe to eat, however, because this product is delivered from genetical egg modifications, it required to be labeled under the food allergen category.

The EVERY Company has developed 4 ingredients; EVERY protein, EVERY Egg White, EVERY Egg, and EVERY Pepsin. They were made using a fermentation technology that uses yeast to convert sugar to egg protein, similar to the making of beer. Due to the uniqueness of the egg proteins being produced, egg functions like binding remain the same.

The EVERY egg was debuted at Chef Daniel Humm's 3-star Michelin Restaurant located in Eleven Madison Park.
