= Bruce Friedrich =

American food company founder

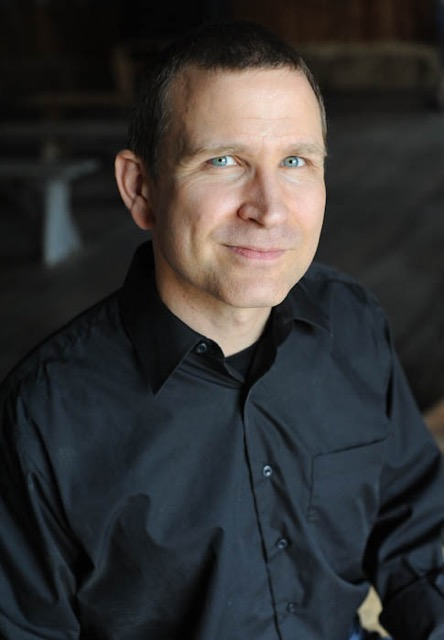
- Born: Bruce Gregory Friedrich; August 7, 1969 (age 57); West Lafayette, Indiana, U.S.
- Education: Georgetown University Law Center (D.Jur.); Johns Hopkins University (MA in Education); London School of Economics and Political Science (Economics); Grinnell College (BA in English, Economics, and Religion)
- Occupation: Nonprofit executive
- Spouse: Alka Chandna
- Children: 1

Bruce Gregory Friedrich (born August 7, 1969) is co-founder and president of The Good Food Institute (GFI), a Y Combinator funded non-profit that promotes plant-based and cultivated meat. He is also a co-founder of the alternative protein venture capital firm New Crop Capital. Friedrich previously worked for PETA and Farm Sanctuary.

== Early life and education ==
Friedrich was born in West Lafayette, Indiana, on August 7, 1969. In 1987, he graduated from Norman High School in Norman, Oklahoma. In 1996, Friedrich graduated Phi Beta Kappa from Grinnell College with a B.A. in English, Economics, and Religion. He holds degrees from Johns Hopkins University and the London School of Economics, and received his J.D. degree from Georgetown University Law Center, graduating magna cum laude, Order of the Coif.

== Career ==
Friedrich served as Director of Policy for four years at Farm Sanctuary. Prior to that, he worked at PETA for 15 years. As Head of Public Campaigns, he led many of the organization's highest-profile campaigns, including one from the early 2000s when PETA asked the Green Bay Packers football team to change its name, which had originated from a defunct meat packing plant in the Green Bay area.

Friedrich founded The Good Food Institute (GFI) in 2016 with the help of Mercy For Animals, and has since been its president. GFI is working to transform the food system by promoting price- and taste-competitive alternatives to animal products. In recognition for his work at GFI, Friedrich was named an "American Food Hero" by the Eating Well magazine in 2021.

Friedrich is a co-founder of New Crop Capital; a venture capital firm for funding the development of alternative proteins.

Friedrich is a TED fellow. In 2019, he gave a TED Talk that has since been viewed more than 2.3 million times and translated into more than 30 languages, in which he argued that plant-based and cultivated meat have the potential to transform the global meat industry, prevent climate change, mitigate pandemic risk, and decrease the prevalence of antibiotic resistant pathogens.

Friedrich is the author of the 2026 book Meat: How the Next Agricultural Revolution Will Transform Humanity’s Favorite Food—and Our Future. The book advocates for a transition to plant-based and cultivated meat, and has received praise from Jane Goodall, Peter Singer, Cass Sunstein, and Nobel laureate Michael Kremer, among others. Publishers Weekly included the book as a "Top 10" release in the Science category in a preview of Spring 2026 releases.

== The Good Food Institute ==
Friedrich is the CEO of The Good Food Institute (GFI), which he co-founded in 2016. GFI advocates for a transition from emissions-intensive animal-based meat to plant-based and cultivated meat. GFI employs approximately 200 employees with affiliate offices in India, Brazil, Singapore, Israel, and Europe. Until federal agencies increased their involvement, GFI was the primary funder of academic research on plant-based and cultivated meat; it also communicates with lawmakers. Friedrich is described by industry figures as a prominent advocate for alternative meat and a key contributor to the growth of the sector.

Following research from Giving Green, an independent charity evaluator focused on identifying highly cost-effective climate philanthropy opportunities, GFI was listed by Giving Green as a top nonprofit working on climate change.

== Philanthropy ==
As an effective altruism advocate, Friedrich is a member of Giving What We Can, a community of people who have pledged to donate a portion of their income to effective charities.

== Personal life ==
Friedrich is Christian and has been vegan since 1987. He converted to Catholicism in 1991 after running a homeless shelter and soup kitchen associated with the Catholic Worker Movement. He is married to Alka Chandna, who works for PETA.

== Works ==
- Friedrich, Bruce (2005). "Effective Advocacy: Stealing from the Corporate Playbook". In Singer, Peter (ed.). In Defence of Animals: The Second Wave. Wiley-Blackwell. ISBN 978-1-4051-1941-2.
- Ball, Matt; Friedrich, Bruce (2009). The Animal Activist's Handbook: Maximizing Our Positive Impact in Today's World. Lantern Books. ISBN 978-1590561201.
- Freston, Kathy; Friedrich, Bruce (2018). Clean Protein: The Revolution that Will Reshape Your Body, Boost Your Energy—and Save Our Planet. Hachette Books. ISBN 978-1602863323.
- Friedrich, Bruce (2025). Meat: How the Next Agricultural Revolution Will Transform Humanity’s Favorite Food—and Our Future. Foreword by Caitlin Welsh. BenBella Books; distributed by Simon & Schuster.

== See also ==
- Cultured meat
- Meat analogue
