= Tomorrow Farms =

American food manufacturer

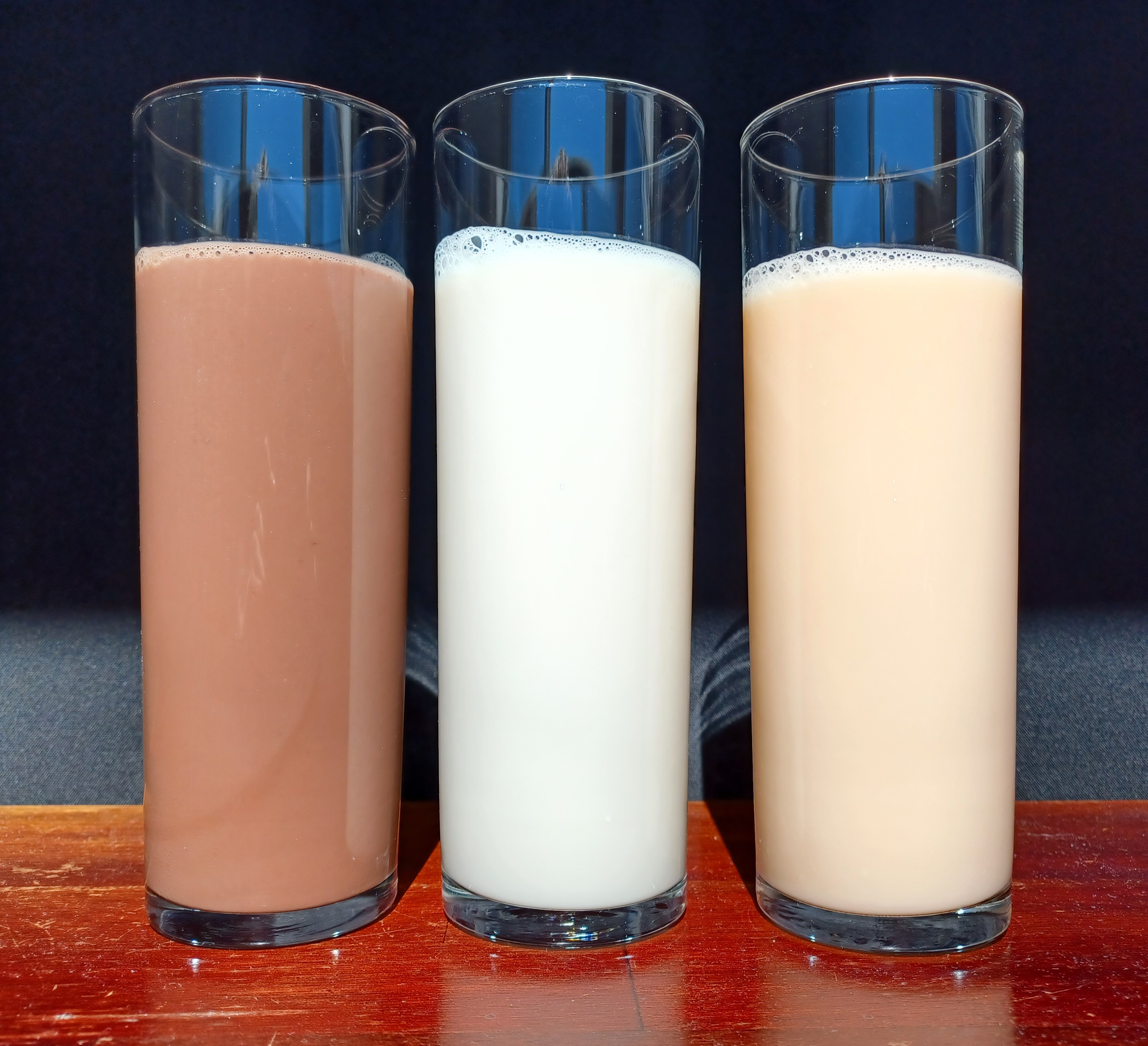
Chocolate, vanilla, and strawberry flavored Bored Cow milk

Tomorrow Farms is an American food manufacturer known for their "Bored Cow" bioidentical milk alternative that was released in May 2022.

== Background ==
Tomorrow Farms is a US company that was incubated by the SALT fund and received further investment led by Lowercarbon Capital, including from Sita Chantramonklasri's Siam Capital. Its leadership team consists of chief executive officer Ben Berman, head of operations Richard Chen, head of brand Luke Kingma, AJ Scaramucci, and Alex Klokus.

== Products ==
=== Bored Cow ===
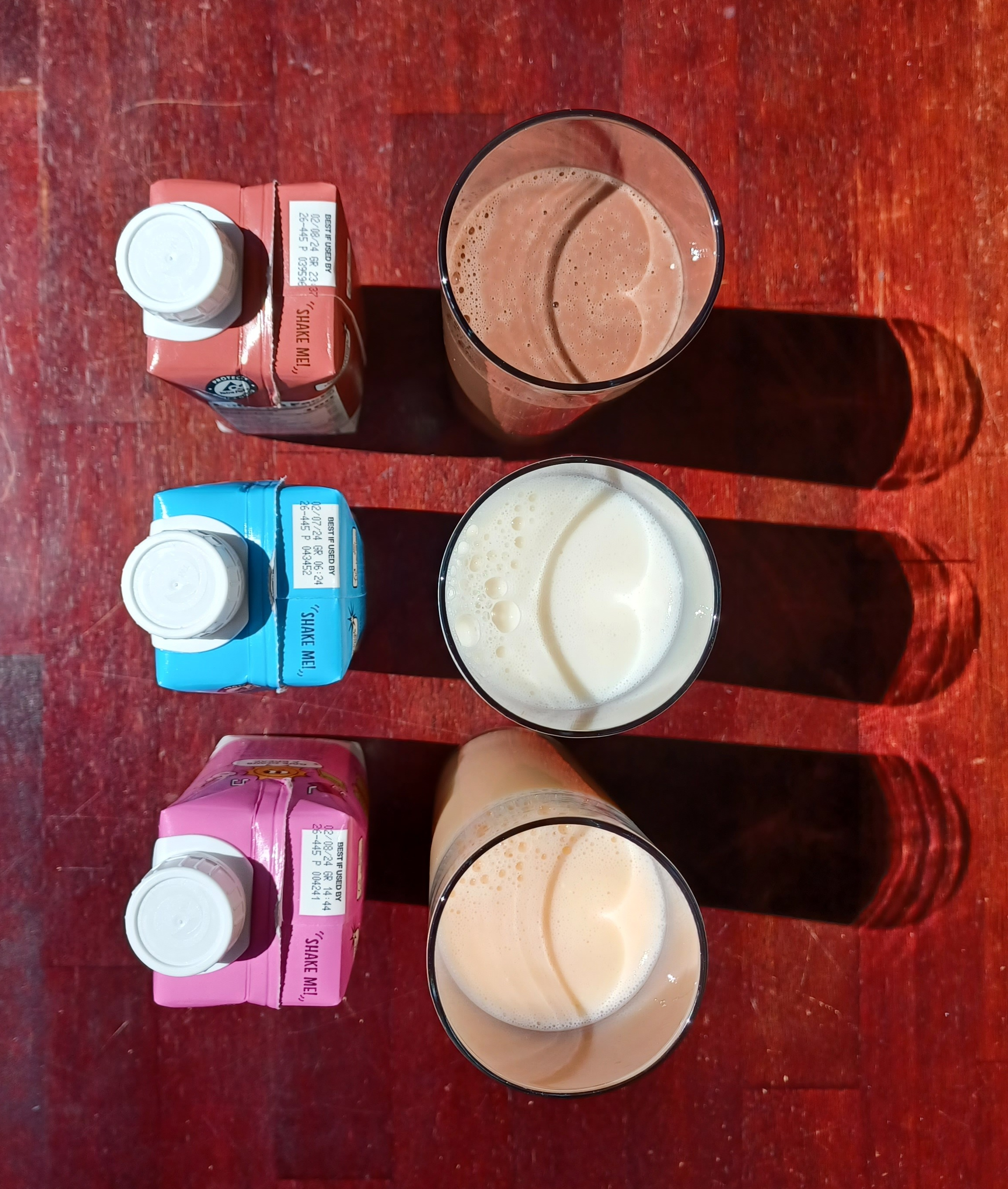
Chocolate, vanilla, and strawberry flavored Bored Cow milk

Bored Cow is a bioidentical milk alternative developed by Tomorrow Farms which was released direct-to-consumer in May 2022. Bored Cow, which serves as the flagship product of Tomorrow Farms, is real milk made in a lab without a cow. It is produced using Whey protein from the California food tech company Perfect Day.
