= Gabor Forgacs =

Gabor Forgacs is a Hungarian theoretical physicist turned bioengineer turned innovator and entrepreneur. He was educated in Hungary, where he earned a MS and a PhD in theoretical physics at the Eötvös Loránd University in Budapest, respectively, in 1972 and in 1976. He started his scientific career at the Central Research Institute for Physics in Budapest in condensed matter physics under the supervision of Alfred Zawadowsky. In 1978 he became the Candidate of Physical Sciences title awarded by the Hungarian National Academy. in 1978 he joined Dr. Harry Frisch at the State University of New York in Albany as a Postdoctoral Fellow and in 1979 moved to the University of Illinois at Urbana-Champaign as a Postdoctoral Fellow in the group of Professor Michael Wortis. In 1981 he returned to the Central Research Institute for Physics in Budapest. In 1984-1986 he worked in the Theoretical Physics Laboratory at the Commissariat d'Energie Atomique (CEA) Saclay France. In 1988 he returned to the USA as Professor of Physics at Clarkson University, Potsdam NY. By 1992 he completed his studies in Biology, in particular the Embryology course at the Marine Biology Lab in Woods Hole and started contributing to the establishment of the new discipline of Biological Physics. In the same year he became the Doctor of Physical Sciences of the Hungarian Academy of Sciences. In 1999 he was named the George H. Vineyard Chair Professor of Biological Physics at the University of Missouri, Columbia (UMC), where he established a Biological Physics Group at the Department of Physics and Astronomy. It is during his years at UMC that he started his entrepreneurial activity, when he started Organovo in 2007, the first company in the space of bioprinting. In 2010 he returned to Clarkson University as the Czanderna-Storky Chair Professor of Physics and the Executive Director of the Shipley Center for Innovation. In 2011 he co-founded the company Modern Meadow that focuses on biofabricated biomaterials and served as its Chief Scientific Officer until 2016. In 2018 he co-founded the company Fork & Good to produce cell-based meat and at present serves as its Chief Scientific Officer.

Dr. Forgacs is the author of over 200 scientific publications, 5 books and inventor/co-inventor on over 80 issued patents. He is the recipient of numerous federal grants by NSF, NIH, NASA, USDA, etc. He is the Fellow of the American Physical Society, member of the National Academy of Inventors USA and of the Hungarian National Academy of Sciences. He was named as one of the “100 most innovative people in business in 2010” by FastCompany.
