= Perfect Day (company) =

Food technology company

- Industry: Biotechnology
- Predecessor: Muufri
- Founded: April 28, 2014; 12 years ago
- Founders: Isha Datar, Ryan Pandya, & Perumal Gandhi
- Headquarters: Berkeley, California
- Products: Biosynthetic dairy proteins

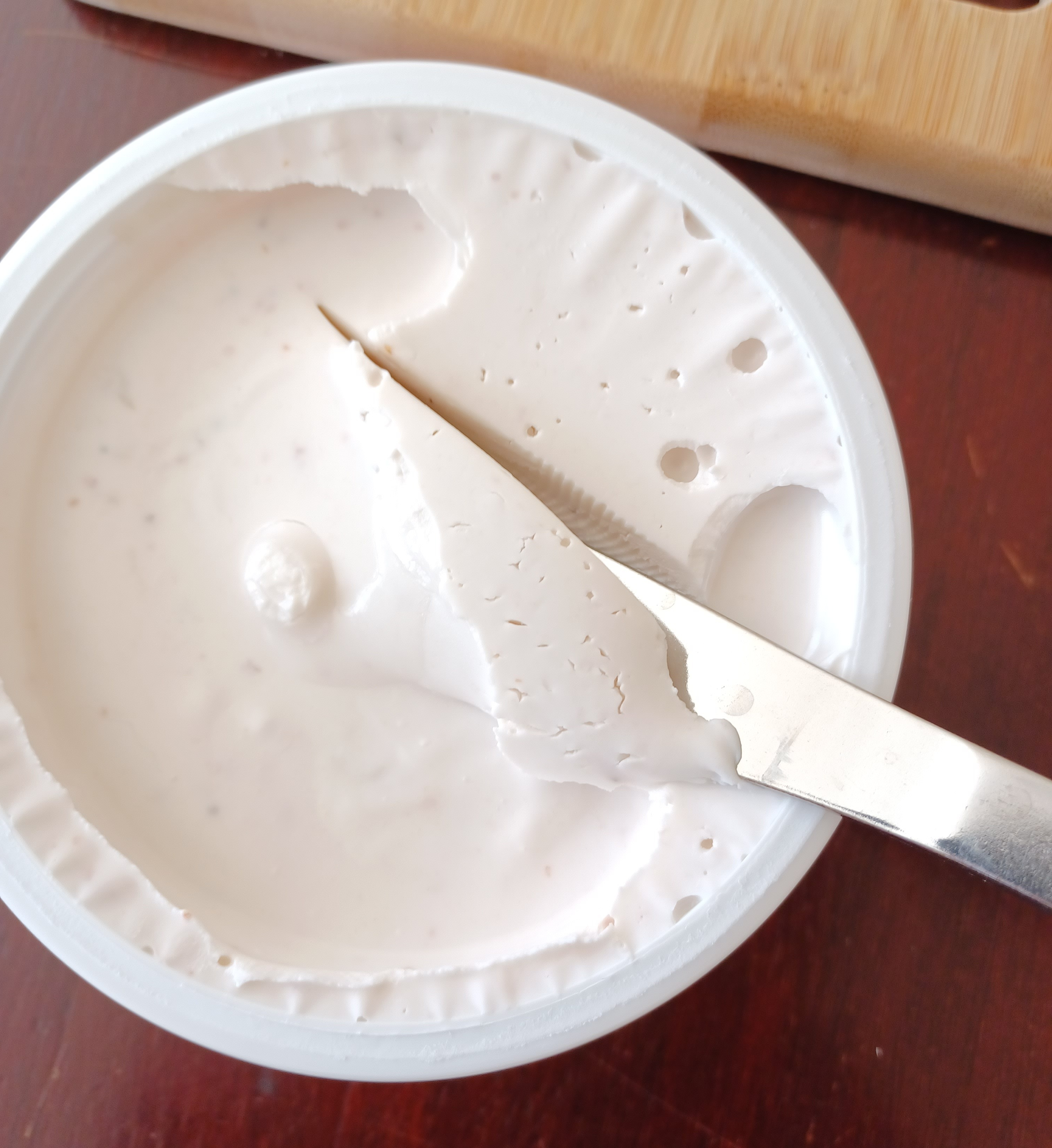
Strawberry-flavored cream cheese made with Perfect Day animal-free dairy

Perfect Day, Inc. is a food technology startup company based in Berkeley, California, that has developed processes of creating whey protein by fermentation in microbiota, specifically from fungi in bioreactors, instead of extraction from bovine milk.

The name Perfect Day is a reference to the Lou Reed song of the same name.

== History ==
The founders, Isha Datar, Ryan Pandya, and Perumal Gandhi applied for the Synbiota biotechnology accelerator. Winners would have access to laboratory space, mentorship, and $30,000 in initial funding. Since Isha Datar was the Director of New Harvest, they decided to apply as the "New Harvest Dairy Project", hoping that New Harvest’s established network would help with the application. On April 22, 2014, their application was accepted.

Perfect Day was incorporated on April 28, 2014, under the name "Muufri", and was re-named "Perfect Day" in 2016. The Bay Area company was originally focused on the production of dairy goods (such as cheese or yogurt) for direct retail sale to consumers.

Bob Iger, former chairman of The Walt Disney Company, joined the management board in October 2020. The board consists of cofounders Ryan Pandya, Perumal Gandhi, as well as Iger, Aftab Mathur of Temasek Holdings and Patrick Zhang of Horizons Ventures.

U.S. dairy farmers have asked the Food and Drug Administration (FDA) to enforce the definition of milk in Title 21 of the Code of Federal Regulations to prevent competition from Perfect Day products as well as plant milk, which can be labeled milk in the U.S. because FDA does not enforce the definition.

Perfect Day announced in late 2017 that it had been negotiating with possible food industry partners to incorporate its manufactured protein into existing food production lines, becoming a business-to-business ingredient company and marking a change in its business strategy of targeting the end-user (consumer). In November 2018, the company announced a joint development agreement with Archer Daniels Midland to provide commercial-scale volumes of non-animal whey protein.

=== Consumer products ===
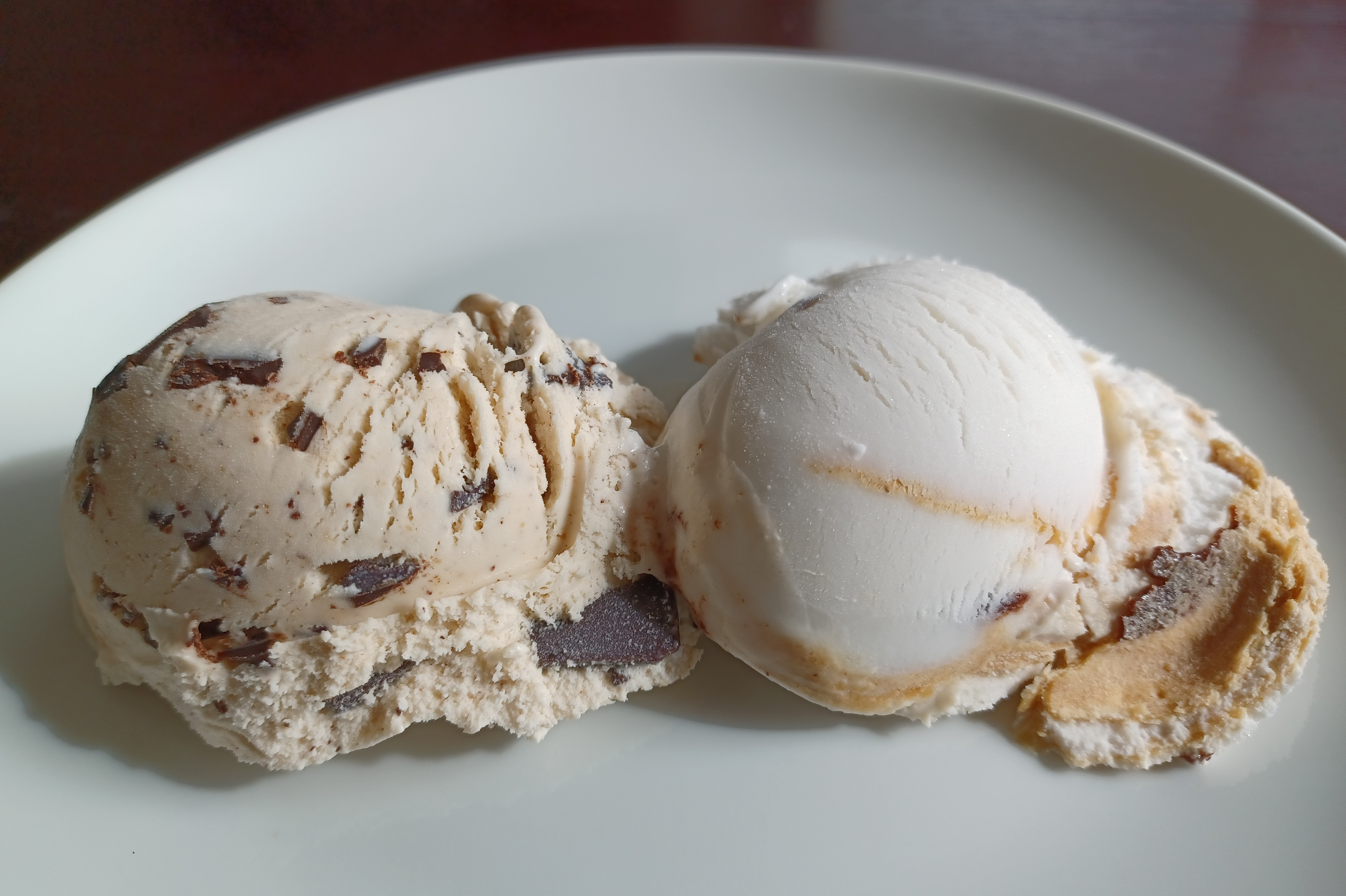
Brave Robot ice cream

On July 11, 2019, Perfect Day released its first product, an ice cream made from non-animal whey protein. The launch was limited to 1,000 3-pint bundles available for $60 and sold exclusively through the company's website. The production run sold out within hours.

As of 2020, Perfect Day is commercializing its products through the Urgent Company, which sells the Brave Robot brand of vegan dairy ice cream. In November 2020, ice cream maker Graeter's began to sell vegan dairy ice cream based on Perfect Day products. Perfect Day also began supplying the company Smitten Ice Cream for its N'ice Cream products.

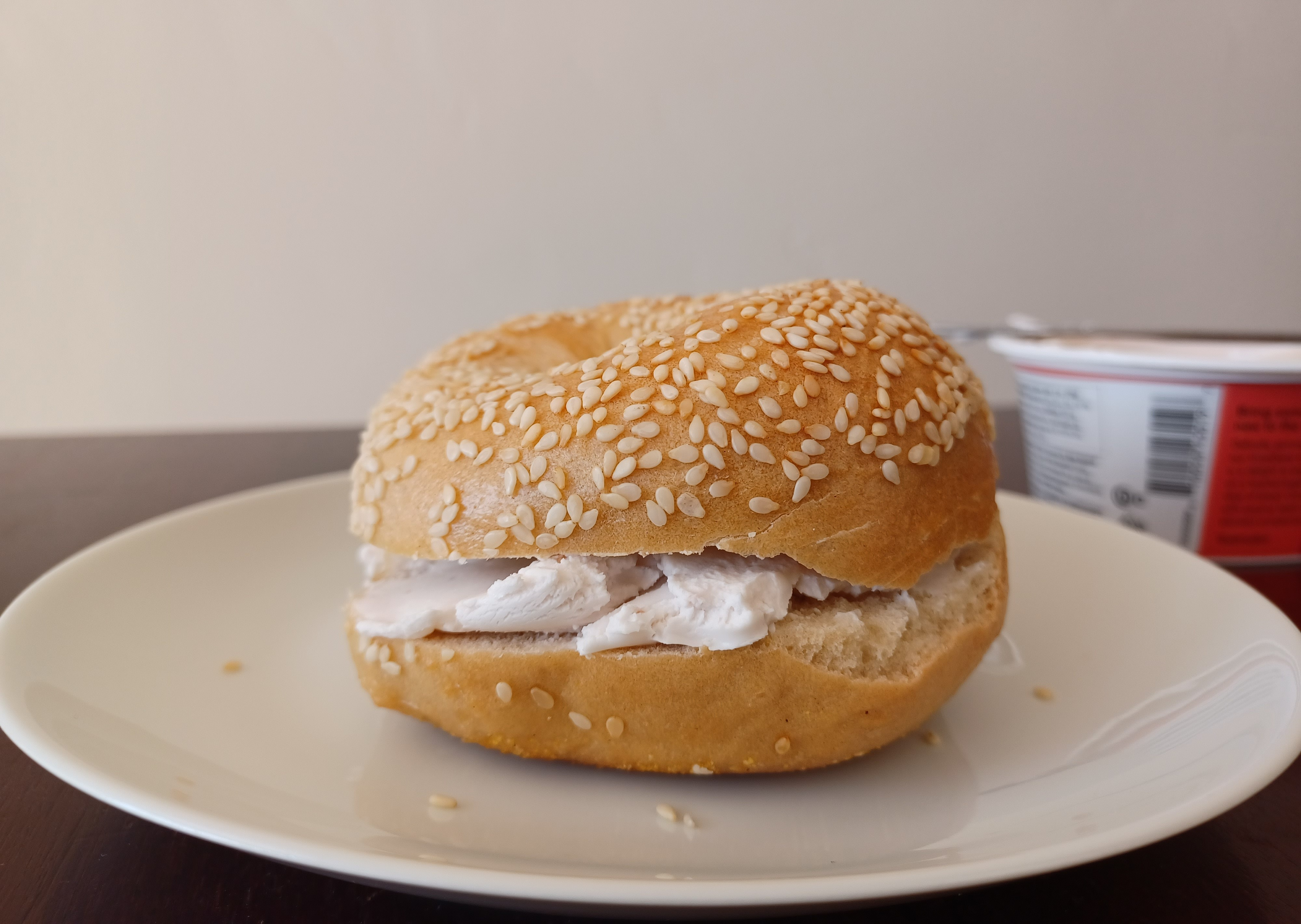
A bagel with Modern Kitchen strawberry cream cheese

In September 2021 Perfect Day started marketing an animal-free cream cheese under the brand Modern Kitchen.

In November 2021, Perfect Day announced its entrance into the sports nutrition market, offering vegan whey protein powders under the California Performance Co. brand.

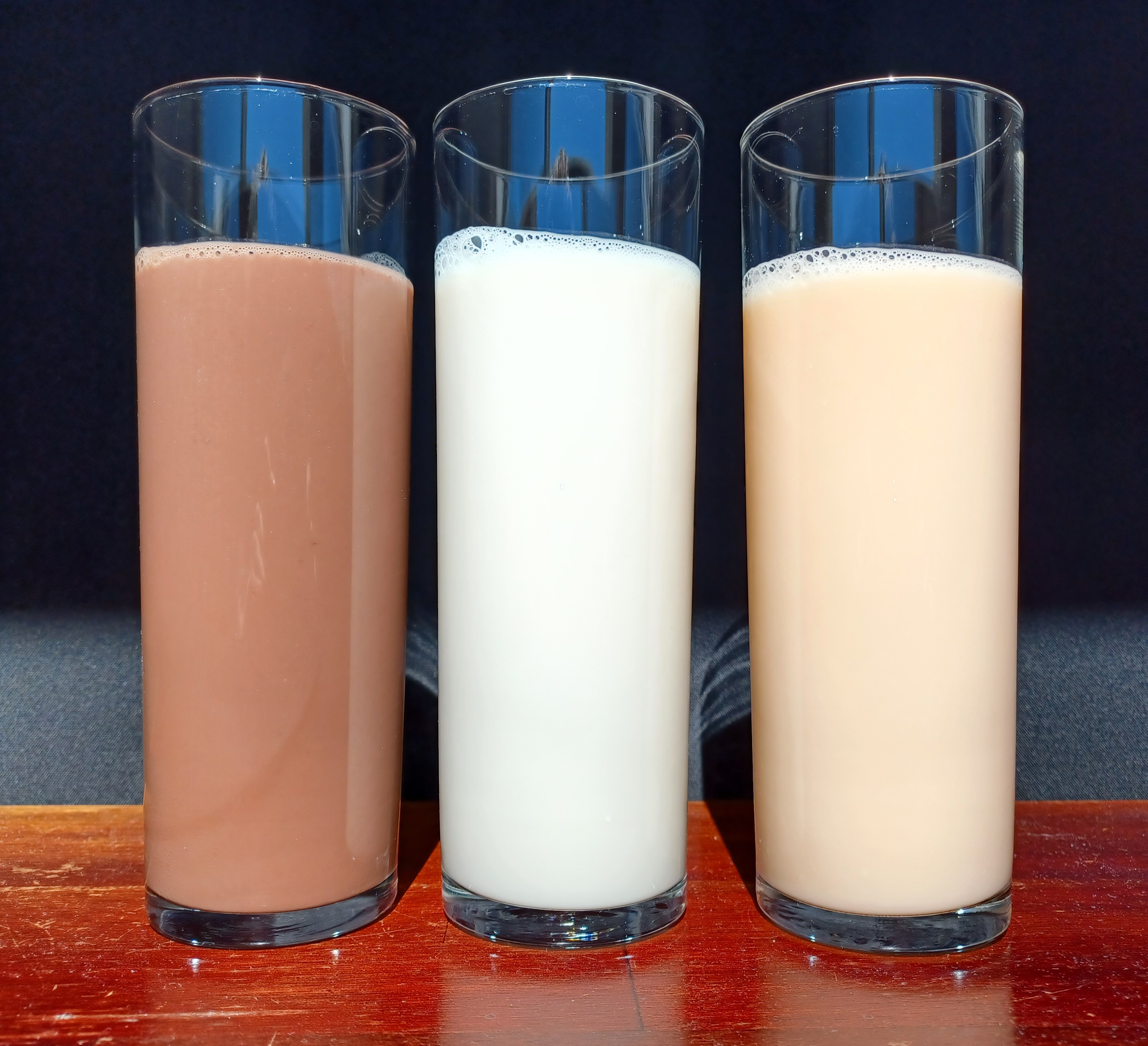
Chocolate, vanilla, and strawberry flavored milk sold with the Bored Cow brand

In 2022, the company Tomorrow Farms launched Bored Cow, a brand of chocolate, vanilla, and strawberry milk made with Perfect Day's whey.

== Technology ==
To produce whey proteins from non-animal sources, Perfect Day bioengineered microbiota to include DNA sequences that instruct the cells to produce proteins that are conventionally found in cow's milk. The microbiota are then grown in fermentation tanks where they convert a carbohydrate source such as corn syrup into flora-based dairy protein.

Similar recombinant technology is used elsewhere in the food industry, including to make rennet (a common cheesemaking enzyme) and heme. The resulting protein, once separated from the genetically modified microbiota, has the same organoleptic and nutritional properties as animal-derived proteins. After they are separated and dried into a powder, the proteins are used as ingredients in other foods that conventionally contain dairy protein.

== Backing ==
Perfect Day raised $61.5 million between 2014 and 2019, primarily supported by Horizons Ventures, a Hong Kong-based venture capital firm, and Temasek Holdings, the investment company that manages the government wealth of Singapore. For their Series C investment round, the company announced they had raised an additional $140 million in December 2019, and this amount was expanded to $300 million in July 2020. The CPP Investment Board has invested in Perfect Day. The total funding received was $360 million as of October 2020.

The Postcode Lottery Green Challenge awarded the company a runner-up prize of €200,000 in September 2015 (equivalent to US$310,000 in 2025).

== See also ==
- Cellular agriculture
