= The Good Food Institute =

Nonprofit promoting animal product alternatives

- Abbreviation: GFI
- Formation: February 1, 2016; 10 years ago
- Founder: Bruce Friedrich
- Type: 501(c)(3)
- Registration no.: EIN 81-0840578
- Purpose: Alternative protein advocacy
- Location: Asia Pacific, Brazil, Europe, India, Israel, U.S.
- Region served: Global
- President: Bruce Friedrich
- Key people: Gustavo Guadagnini (CEO, Brazil); Ilya Sheyman (CEO, United States); Mirte Gosker (Managing Director, Singapore); Nir Goldstein (CEO, Israel); Alex Mayers (Managing Director, Europe); Sneha Singh (General Manager, India)
- Staff: 150 (6 entities: US, India, Israel, Brazil, APAC, Europe)
- Website: gfi.org

The Good Food Institute (GFI) is a 501(c)(3) nonprofit organization that promotes plant- and cell-based alternatives to animal products, particularly meat, dairy, and eggs. It was created in 2016 by the nonprofit organization Mercy For Animals with Bruce Friedrich as the chief executive officer. GFI has more than 150 staff across six affiliates in the United States, India, Israel, Brazil, Asia Pacific, and Europe. GFI was one of Animal Charity Evaluators' four "top charities" for animal advocacy in 2022.

== Mission ==
A primary motivation for GFI's founding was to address the negative impacts of global animal agriculture, particularly the industry's contribution to climate change, antimicrobial resistance, and environmental degradation. To this end, GFI works to "make alternative proteins accessible, affordable, and delicious" since plant- and cell-based animal product alternatives contribute significantly less to the aforementioned problems.

== Activities ==
GFI engages scientists, policymakers, and entrepreneurs in a variety of activities to advance the alternative protein industry, which includes manufacturers and retailers of plant-based, cellular agriculture and protein fermentation products.

=== Strategic support ===
GFI provides strategic support to start-ups and established food companies, restaurants, and major meat producers to help them develop and advertise alternative proteins.

=== Scientific research ===
GFI creates open-access resources and publishes scientific research about plant-based and cell-based meat technology.

=== Market research ===
GFI publishes annual State of the Industry Reports for the plant-based, cellular agriculture and protein fermentation industries. The 2020 reports show that:

- Plant-based: U.S. plant-based meat, egg, and dairy companies raised $2.2 billion in 2020, tripling the amount from 2019. The value of the U.S. plant-based retail market equaled $7 billion in 2020.
- Cellular agriculture: Cell-based meat companies raised $366 million in 2020, increasing the 2019 figure by almost sixfold. The industry grew from 55 to more than 70 companies.
- Fermentation: The alternative protein fermentation industry consists of approximately 50 firms which have collectively attracted investments of $587 million in 2020.

In 2018, nonprofit research firm Faunalytics partnered with GFI to measure consumer attitudes towards cell-based meat when presented with information about its environmental and societal benefits. Sixty-six percent of respondents said they would try cell-based meat; 53% would eat it instead of conventionally produced meat; 46% would buy it regularly; 40% would be willing to pay more for it.

=== Grantmaking ===
GFI runs a competitive research grant program to fund open-access scientific research for the development of plant-based and cell-based meat. As of 2021, GFI has awarded 38 grants totalling more than $7 million.

=== The Good Food Conference ===
Every year in September, GFI holds a conference convening leaders across the plant-based and cell-based industries, research community, venture capital, tech sector, and traditional food industry.

=== Legal action ===
GFI has filed several lawsuits to contest policies and regulations implemented by several US states and federal agencies which ban producers of plant-based products from labeling that uses terminology conventionally associated with animal products, such as "soy milk" and "veggie burger".

== Governance ==
In 2021, GFI employees reported that they were scared to openly disagree with their seniors due to a fear of retaliation. For this reason, Animal Charity Evaluators removed GFI from its "top charity" list for one year, reinstating it in 2022.

Animal Charity Evaluators stated in 2022 that since their last review, "[GFI] leadership has taken a series of actions, such as training staff on how to use the anonymous reporting system, distributing an anonymous survey to staff asking for feedback about their comfort with voicing their opinions without fear of retaliation and using the anonymous reporting hotline, and providing anti-retaliation training to all supervisors and staff. Based on this limited information, our impression is that leadership is working on addressing these situations."

== Reception ==
In 2018, GFI participated in the startup accelerator Y Combinator, receiving funding and strategic support. Y Combinator lists "cellular agriculture and clean meat" as one of its funding priorities, stating that "the world will massively benefit from a more sustainable, cheaper and more healthy production of meat".

GFI has ties with the effective altruism movement, having received endorsements and financial support from several effective altruism-affiliated organizations. For instance, Open Philanthropy awarded GFI with several major grants in support of its general operations and international expansion, totalling $6.5 million as of August 2021.

Sam Harris' Waking Up Foundation recommends GFI as one of its top charities.

In 2022, GFI was chosen as one of four top charities by Animal Charity Evaluators.

== See also ==
- New Harvest
- Timeline of cellular agriculture
