= Modern Meadow =

Biofabricated materials company

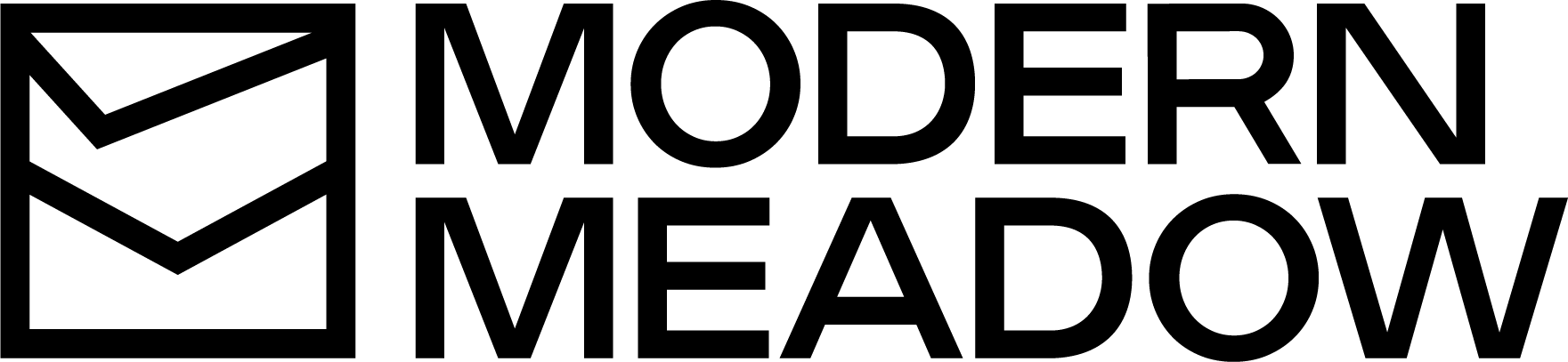
- Industry: Biotechnology
- Founded: 2011
- Founders: Andras Forgacs; Gabor Forgacs; Karoly Jakab; Francoise Marga
- Headquarters: Nutley, New Jersey, U.S.
- Key people: David Williamson (CEO)
- Website: modernmeadow.com

Modern Meadow is an American biotechnology company that uses biofabrication to create sustainable materials. The company was co-founded by Andras Forgacs, Gabor Forgacs, Karoly Jakab and Francoise Marga in 2011, and is based in Nutley, New Jersey.

== History ==
In 2011, Andras Forgacs and his father Gabor Forgacs, Jakab, and Marga co-founded Modern Meadow. The company’s initial goal was to create leather and meat in tissue cultures, without using live animals.

In 2018, Modern Meadow partnered with Evonik to commercially produce biofabricated materials.

Modern Meadow entered into a joint venture in 2021 with Limonta, an Italian textiles and materials company, to create BioFabric. The new company creates sustainable materials through a process called biofabrication.

In 2017, it was announced that Modern Meadow had plans to develop the “world’s first biofabricated leather”. The company displayed a prototype T-shirt made from the material at the Museum of Modern Art in an exhibit, “Items: Is Fashion Modern,” until 2018. In 2022, Catherine Roggero-Lovisi became the company’s CEO.

In 2023, the company received the EPA Green Chemistry award for the development of a dyeing technology that uses a mixture of plant-based proteins and biopolymers.

David Williamson was appointed CEO in 2024.

== Technology ==
The company makes plant-based protein biopolymers to create a variety of textiles. It combines plant-based proteins with bio-based polyurethane. The resulting polymer blend is called Bio-Alloy.

Bio-Alloy is used to create plant-based leather alternatives including Bio-Tex, which the company developed for the American fashion brand Tory Burch; as well as Bio-VERA, a blend of biomaterial and synthetic polymer substrate made for use in transportation, wall coverings, and interior design.
