= Jason Gaverick Matheny =

American national security expert

Jason Matheny
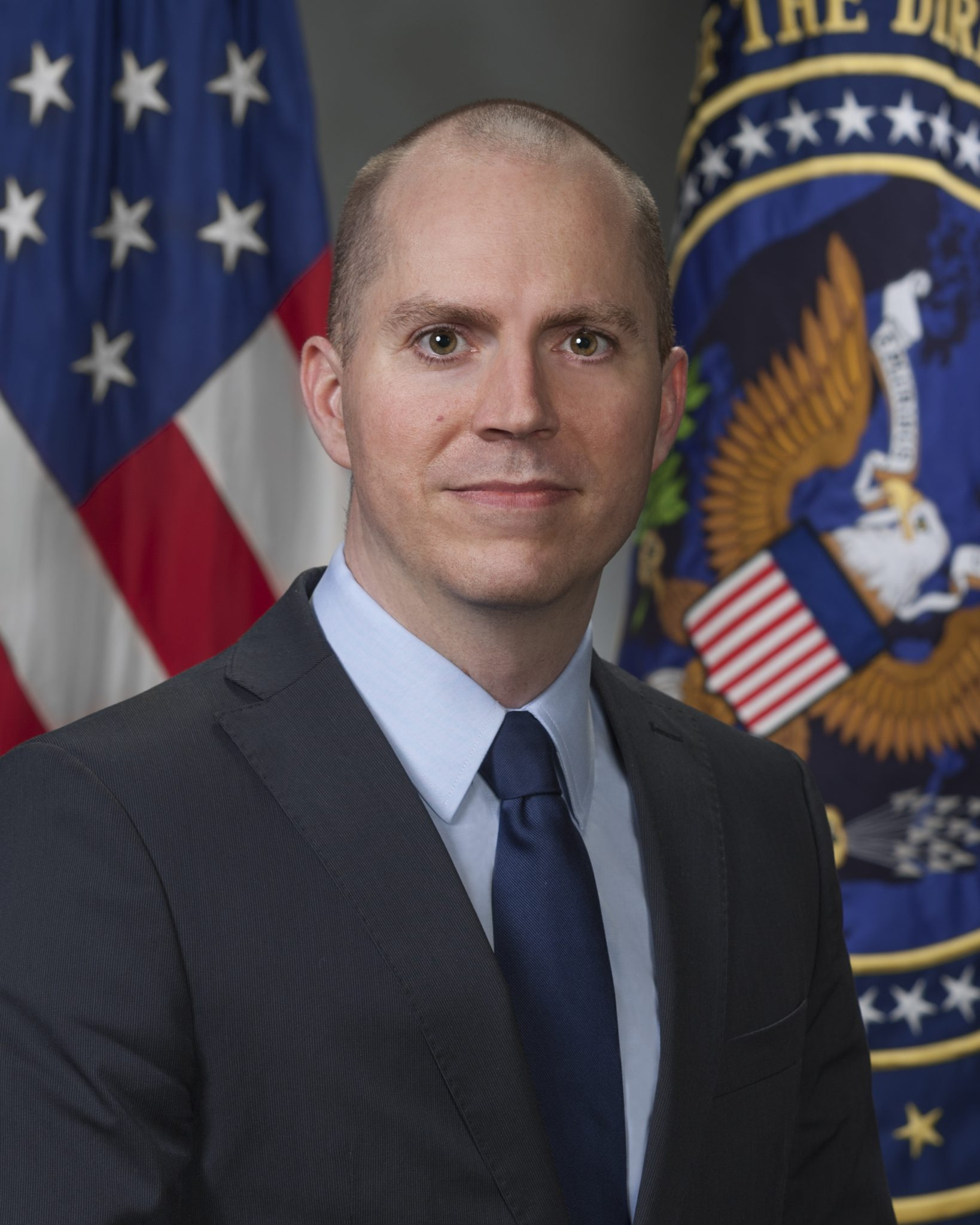

President and CEO of RAND Corporation
- Incumbent
- Assumed office July 5, 2022
- Preceded by: Michael D. Rich

Personal details
- Born: Jason Gaverick Matheny
- Education: University of Chicago (BA); Duke University (MBA); Johns Hopkins University (MPH, PhD)
- Scientific career
- Thesis: The Economics of Pharmaceutical Development: Costs, Risks, and Incentives (2013)
- Doctoral advisor: Bradley Herring

Jason Gaverick Matheny is an American national security expert who has been president and CEO of the RAND Corporation since July 2022. He was previously a senior appointee in the Biden administration from March 2021 to June 2022. He served as deputy assistant to the president for technology and national security, deputy director for national security in the White House Office of Science and Technology Policy, and coordinator for technology and national security at the White House National Security Council.

Matheny previously was the founding director of the Center for Security and Emerging Technology and a commissioner on the National Security Commission on Artificial Intelligence, to which he was appointed by Congress in 2018. Previously he was an assistant director of national intelligence, and director of the Intelligence Advanced Research Projects Activity (IARPA). Matheny has had ties with the Effective Altruist movement.

== Early life and education ==
Matheny grew up in Louisville, Kentucky. He obtained a Bachelor of Arts degree from the University of Chicago in 1996, where he majored in art history. He obtained an MBA from the Fuqua School of Business at Duke University in 2003, and a Master of Public Health degree from Johns Hopkins Bloomberg School of Public Health in 2004. He spent six months in India evaluating the efficacy of the HIV-prevention Avahan project, supported by the Bill & Melinda Gates Foundation. He received a PhD in applied economics from Johns Hopkins University. His doctoral dissertation is titled: "The Economics of Pharmaceutical Development: Costs, Risks, and Incentives".

== Career ==
Matheny joined IARPA in 2009, working as a program manager for the Aggregative Contingent Estimation Program and the Open Source Indicators Program. After working as a program manager, he was an associate office director, office director, and director.

Prior to joining IARPA, Matheny was director of research at the Future of Humanity Institute at Oxford University, where his work focused on existential risks.

He has also held positions at the World Bank, the Applied Physics Laboratory, the Center for Biosecurity, the Seva Foundation, and Princeton University, and has co-chaired the Networking and Information Technology Research and Development Task Force on Artificial Intelligence, which authored the National Artificial Intelligence Research and Development Strategic Plan, released by the White House in October 2016.

Besides his work on emerging technologies and catastrophic risks, Matheny is recognized for having popularized the concept of cultured meat, after co-authoring a paper on cultured meat production in the early 2000s and founding New Harvest, the world's first non-profit organization dedicated to supporting in vitro meat research.

== Recognition ==
Matheny's work was called one of the "ideas of the year" by The New York Times, and he was named one of Foreign Policy's top 100 global thinkers.

Matheny is a member of the National Academies' Intelligence Community Studies Board, the National Academies' Committee on Science and Innovation Leadership for the 21st Century, the Department of Commerce Emerging Technology Technical Advisory Committee, the Department of Energy AIML Working Group, the AAAS Committee on Science, Engineering, and Public Policy, the Nuclear Threat Initiative Science and Technology Advisory Group, the Center for a New American Security Task Force on AI and National Security, the Carnegie Endowment for International Peace Encryption Working Group, and is a Non-Resident Senior Associate at the Center for Strategic and International Studies. He is a recipient of the Intelligence Community's Award for Individual Achievement in Science and Technology, the National Intelligence Superior Service Medal, and the Presidential Early Career Award for Scientists and Engineers.
