= The EVERY Company =

U.S. vegan biotechnology company

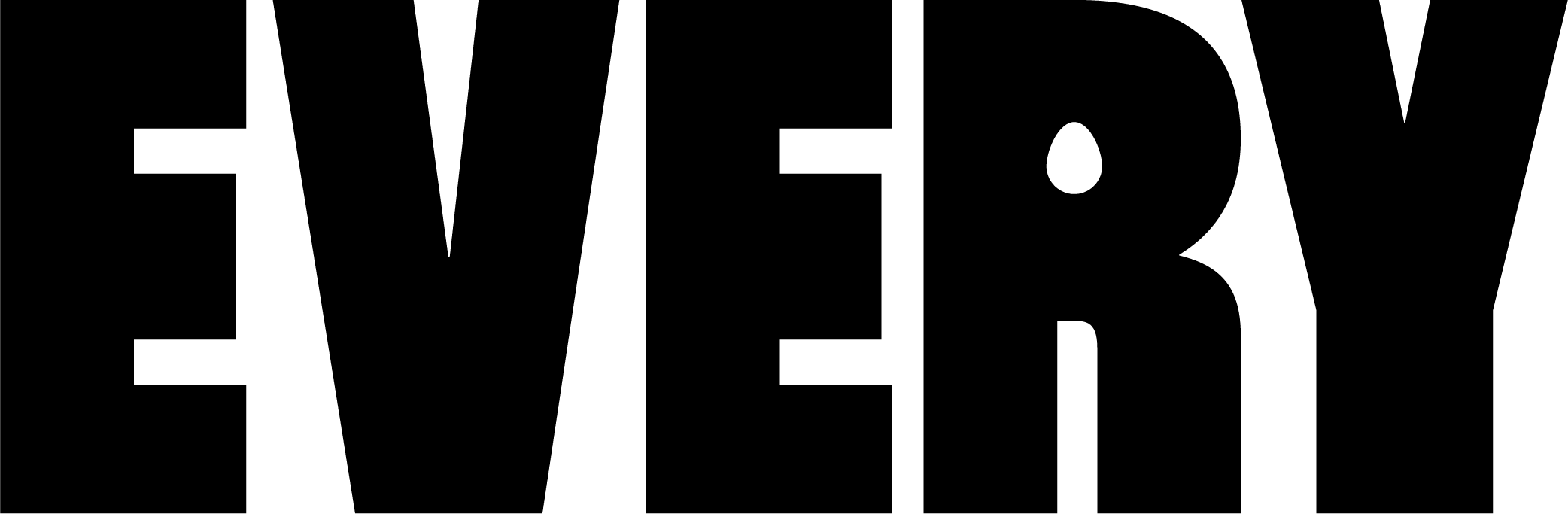
- Type: Private
- Industry: Biotechnology; Foodtech
- Founded: 2015; 11 years ago
- Founders: Arturo Elizondo; David Anchel
- Headquarters: South San Francisco, California, US
- Key people: Arturo Elizondo (CEO)
- Website: every.com

The EVERY Company (formerly Clara Foods Co.) is an American biotechnology company that develops proteins and other products traditionally sourced from animals. It does this by using yeast to convert sugar into proteins that are similar to those found in animals and animal products.

Founded in 2015 and headquartered in South San Francisco, California, The EVERY Company's mission is to accelerate the transition to animal-free and more sustainable proteins and reduce factory farming practices. They provide companies that rely on animal-based products with animal-free alternatives that taste the same and serve the same function.

== History ==
The EVERY Company was founded by Arturo Elizondo and Dave Anchel, who met at a conference in 2014. Soon after, the pair began working on their idea to use microbial fermentation that could create eggs without the need for a chicken. They were part of the inaugural cohort of SOSV's biotech accelerator IndieBio.

Grupo Bimbo, the world's largest bakery, invested in the company in 2019. In 2020, The EVERY Company released its first product, a digestive supplement.

In April 2021, the company announced a partnership with ZX Ventures, the innovation arm of the world's largest brewing company, AB InBev. The partnership will scale production of The EVERY Company's proprietary egg protein at volumes similar to those of AB InBev's breweries using fermentation. This was AB InBev's first partnership with a food company.

In 2023, EVERY company announced that the actress Anne Hathaway invested money in the company being her first B2B experience. She believes that the food system is desperately in need of change.

== Products ==
The EVERY Company developed the first animal-free egg white, which can be used instead of traditional eggs for use in baking, nutrition, and industrial use. It foams, gels and binds, similar to a traditional egg white and can be used to make vegan alternatives to popular egg-based foods, such as meringue or scrambled eggs.

The company has also launched the first animal-free bioidentical pepsin for industrial use in pharmaceuticals, enabling vegan alternatives to medications that use the ingredient.

In 2022, The EVERY Company launched Every EggWhite, an animal-free egg replacement ingredient for bakery customers. The ingredient's performance is demonstrated in the applications of macarons.

== See also ==
- Cellular agriculture
