= List of cultured meat companies =

This is a list of companies involved in the sale and development of cultured meat, along with information about them.

Because the commercial production of cultured meat is as of the 2020s still a developing industry, with unprecedented technological challenges and breakthroughs or failures, the progress of pioneers and early start-ups has received much attention in the media and the scientific community. The number of cultured meat companies increased from about 10 start-ups in 2016 to "98 cultured meat companies engaged in culture-related meat production" in December 2022. In addition to these companies, non-profit organisations such as New Harvest, the Good Food Institute, ProVeg International and the Cellular Agriculture Society advocate for, fund and research cultured meat.

== Cultured meat companies ==
Note: dates in italics refer to projected dates of achievement in the future; they may shift.

Name	Founded	Area	Focus	Proof of concept	Pilot plant	Regulatory approval	Market entry
Aleph Farms	2017	Israel	Beef	Dec 2018	Feb 2022	Jan 2024: Israel	
Appleton Meats	2016	Canada	Beef				2022~2024 (Dec 2022 claim)
Avant Meats	2018	Hong Kong	Fish protein	Nov 2019	Nov 2023		2030 (2025 claim)
BioCraft Pet Nutrition (formerly Because Animals)	2018	United States	Pet food	May 2019			2022 (Aug 2021 claim)
Believer Meats (formerly Future Meat Technologies)	2018	United States; Israel	Meat	2019	June 2021		December 2025 company shutdown: Claimed 2022 (Oct 2019 claim)
Bene Meat Technologies	2020	Czech Republic	Pet food	May 2024	Circa 2024		Late 2024 or early 2025 (2024 claim)
Biftek	2018	Turkey	Culture media				
BioBQ	2018	United States	Brisket				
BlueNalu	2018	United States	Seafood	Fall 2019	2022		2028 (2023 claim)
BioTech Foods (acquired by JBS)	2017	Spain	Pork		2020		mid-2024 (Dec 2021 claim)
CellX	2020	China	Pork	2021	August 2023		2025 (2023 claim)
Clear Meat	2019	India	Poultry				2022 (May 2019 claim)
Clever Carnivore	2021	USA	Pork, Beef, Lamb	May 2023	June 2024		
Cultured Hub (Note: The Cultured Hub, or Cultured Food Innovation Hub, located near Kemptthal railway station in Lindau, Canton of Zürich, is a joint ventrue of Migros, Givaudan and Bühler.)	2021	Switzerland	Meat		December 2024		
Eat Just (formerly Hampton Creek)	2011	United States	Meat	Dec 2017	Constructing (Jan 2020)	November 2020: Singapore; June 2023: United States	Dec 2020: restaurants Singapore; By Jan 2023: foodservices Singapore; July 2023: restaurants US; Commercial sales have been "paused"
Finless Foods	2016	United States	Tuna	Sep 2017	Constructing (Oct 2021)		
Forsea Foods	2021	Israel	Seafood	Jan 2024			
Higher Steaks	2017	United Kingdom	Pork	July 2020			
IntegriCulture, Inc.	2015	Japan	Foie gras	2021 (June 2018 claim)	2021 (July 2020 claim)		
Matrix Meats	2019	United States	Scaffolding	2020			
Meatable	2018	Netherlands	Pork	End 2020	Nov 2023		December 2025 Company shutdown after April 2024: public tasting in EU late 2024: restaurants in Singapore (Apr 2024 claim); 2025: United States (Apr 2024 claim)
Meatleo	2021	Canada	Beef				
Mewery	2020	Czech Republic	Pork	2023			
Mirai Foods	2020	Switzerland	Beef	June 2020			
Mission Barns	2018	United States	Fat	2021	Circa 2023		
Mosa Meat (emerged from Maastricht University)	2015	Netherlands	Beef	Aug 2013 (UM)	Installing (May 2020)	Mid-2026 (expected regulatory approval) (Jan 2025 claim)	
Motif FoodWorks	2019	United States	Beef	End 2020 (Aug 2020 claim)			Q4 2021 (beef flavouring) (Oct 2020 claim)
Multus Media	2019	United Kingdom	Culture media	October 2019			
New Age Eats (New Age Meats 2018–22)	2018– 2023	United States	Pork	Sep 2018	Constructing (Oct 2021)		March 2023: company shutdown
Omeat	2019	United States					
Orbillion Bio	2019	United States					
Parima (from merging of GOURMEY and VITAL MEAT in 2025)	2019	France	Duck and Chicken				2026
SavorEat	2016	Israel	Beef				Mid-2021 (restaurants) (May 2020 claim)
SCiFi Foods (formerly Artemys Foods)	2019	United States	Meat	Fall 2020			June 2024: company shutdown
Shiok Meats (acquired by Umami Bioworks 2024)	2018	Singapore	~~Shrimp~~; Beef	2019 (shrimp)			2021 (March 2020 claim)
Steakholder Foods (formerly MeaTech; subsidiary: Peace of Meat)	2019	Israel; Belgium	Foie gras	4 March 2020	Constructing; 2022 (May 2021 claim)		2023 (Dec 2019 claim)
SuperMeat	2015	Israel	Poultry	2018	November 2020		By 2022 (May 2020 claim); Test restaurant Nov 2020
Upside Foods (formerly Memphis Meats)	2015	United States	Poultry	Feb 2016	4 November 2021	June 2023: United States	July 2023: restaurants US; Commercial sales paused January 2024
Vow	2019	Australia	Kangaroo, Quail	Aug 2019	Oct 2022	April 2024: Singapore; April 2025: FSANZ	Apr 2024: SG approval and launch June 2025: AU & NZ market entry
Wildtype	2016	United States	Salmon	June 2019	24 June 2021	28 May 2025: United States	June 2025: U.S. market entry

== Pilot plants ==
Note: data in italics refer to unfinished projects or projected capacities in the future; they may shift.

Company	Location(s)	In service	Projected capacity
Aleph Farms	Rehovot, Israel	Feb 2022	(3,000 m^{2}). Fully operational by summer 2022
Believer Meats (Note: 2018–2022: Future Meat Technologies.) and GEA Group	Rehovot, Israel	June 2021	500 kilograms per day (182,625 kg/y)
Believer Meats and GEA Group	Wilson, North Carolina	Constructing (Sep 2024)	(12,000 tonnes annually)
BioTech Foods (acquired by JBS)	San Sebastián, Spain (production facility)	2020 mid-2024	1,000 tonnes annually (scalable to 4,000 tonnes annually)
BioTech Foods (acquired by JBS)	Florianópolis, Brazil	Constructing (Sep 2023)	(R&D facility)
Clever Carnivore	Chicago, USA	June 2024	2 x 500L bioreactors
Eat Just (Hampton Creek)	San Francisco, California	Constructing (Jan 2020)	(20+ 1200L bioreactors)
Eat Just (Hampton Creek)	Singapore	Constructing plant (Jan 2023)	Unknown number of 6000L bioreactors
Finless Foods	Emeryville, California	Constructing (Oct 2021)	
Meatable and DSM	Leiden, Netherlands (until 2023 Delft)	Nov 2023 (Leiden & Singapore)	5,000 kilograms per day by 2025; 200-litre bioreactors; scalable to 500-litre (Apr 2024)
Mosa Meat and NIZO food research	Cultivate at Scale, Maastricht	Installing (May 2020)	100 kilograms per month (1,200 kg/y) per 200L bioreactor (scalable to 180,000 kg/y)
Mosa Meat and NIZO food research	Biot. Ferm. Factory, Ede	Constructing (Jan 2025)	Scalable to 10,000 litres, open to all Dutch start-ups
Steakholder Foods (MeaTech / Peace of Meat)	Antwerp, Belgium	2 labs March 2020	700 grams per production run
Steakholder Foods (MeaTech / Peace of Meat)	Antwerp, Belgium	Constructing plant (May 2021)	
SuperMeat	Ness Ziona, Israel	November 2020	"Hundreds of kilograms" per week (June 2021)
Upside Foods (Memphis Meats)	Emeryville, California	4 November 2021	22,680 kilograms (50,000 pounds) per year (scalable to 400,000 lbs/y / 181,440 kg/y)
Wildtype	San Francisco, California	24 June 2021	50,000 pounds (22,680 kg) salmon per year (scalable to 200,000 lbs/y / 90,718 kg/y)

== See also ==
- List of vegetarian and vegan companies
