= Total Diet Study =

Hanbok ( Korean Traditional Clothing)

The Total Diet Study is the US FDA´s ongoing annual assessment of U.S. consumers' average dietary intake of about 800 contaminants and nutrients since 1961.

== Description ==
The Total Diet Study is the US FDA´s ongoing annual assessment of U.S. consumers' average dietary intake of about 800 contaminants and nutrients. To this effort its Center for Food Safety and Applied Nutrition at College Park, Maryland has been buying, preparing, and analyzing about "280 kinds of foods and beverages from representative areas of the country, four times a year". To make estimates as realistic as possible, foods are bought from the same places "as consumers do", in each of four regions of the country (North Central, West, South, and Northeast). The purchases or market baskets are identical as much as possible. It is bought in supermarkets, grocery stores, and fast-food restaurants in three cities per region, which change every year.

The FDA Kansas City District Laboratory in Lenexa, Kansas is the central lab for the country and prepares and analyzes each kind of food, combining samples from the 3 cities of a region to make one composite sample. Foods are prepared "as consumers typically would", which includes washing, peeling, cooking. Radionuclide analyses are only done from two market baskets per year at FDA's Engineering and Analytical Center in Winchester, Massachusetts.

With the analysis, FDA estimates the average consumption by the entire U.S. population, and split up by age and gender (from age 14 years onward) each year. The food list is adjusted about every 10 years to account for food trends, changing patterns of what people eat. Likewise data on how much of those foods consumers eat may be adjusted.

FDA states the purpose as tracking food trends and trends in the consumption of contaminants and nutrients in the average American diet, and developing interventions to reduce risks, as needed in its food safety and nutrition programs.

== Foods and analytes ==
Food categories include baby foods, beverages, dairy products, eggs, food mixtures, fruits and fruit juice, grain products, legumes & nuts & seeds, meat & poultry & fish, fats and oils, sweets, vegetables. A Food/Analyte Matrix displays all the specific foods and analytes. Determination methods for analysis including Strontium-90, a beta emitter and for Gamma emitters are published .

As of November 2017 the latest individual-year results for elements are from 2015 for pesticides are from 2012.

== History ==
In 1961, the US FDA began a program to monitor radioactive contamination of foods. Over time, it expanded to include pesticides, industrial and other toxic chemicals, and nutrients. Data are published annually, and electronic data since 1991 are available.

In 1991, the market baskets were updated, and the food list was chosen from the USDA 1987-88 "Nationwide Food Consumption Survey".

The 2003 food-list update used a food list from the USDA's 1994-96, 1998 "Continuing Survey of Food Intakes by Individuals" (CSFII) published in 2000.

In 2014, FDA updated methods of measuring elements in foods to detect and differentiate them at lower levels.
