= Mark Post =

Dutch scientist (born 1957)

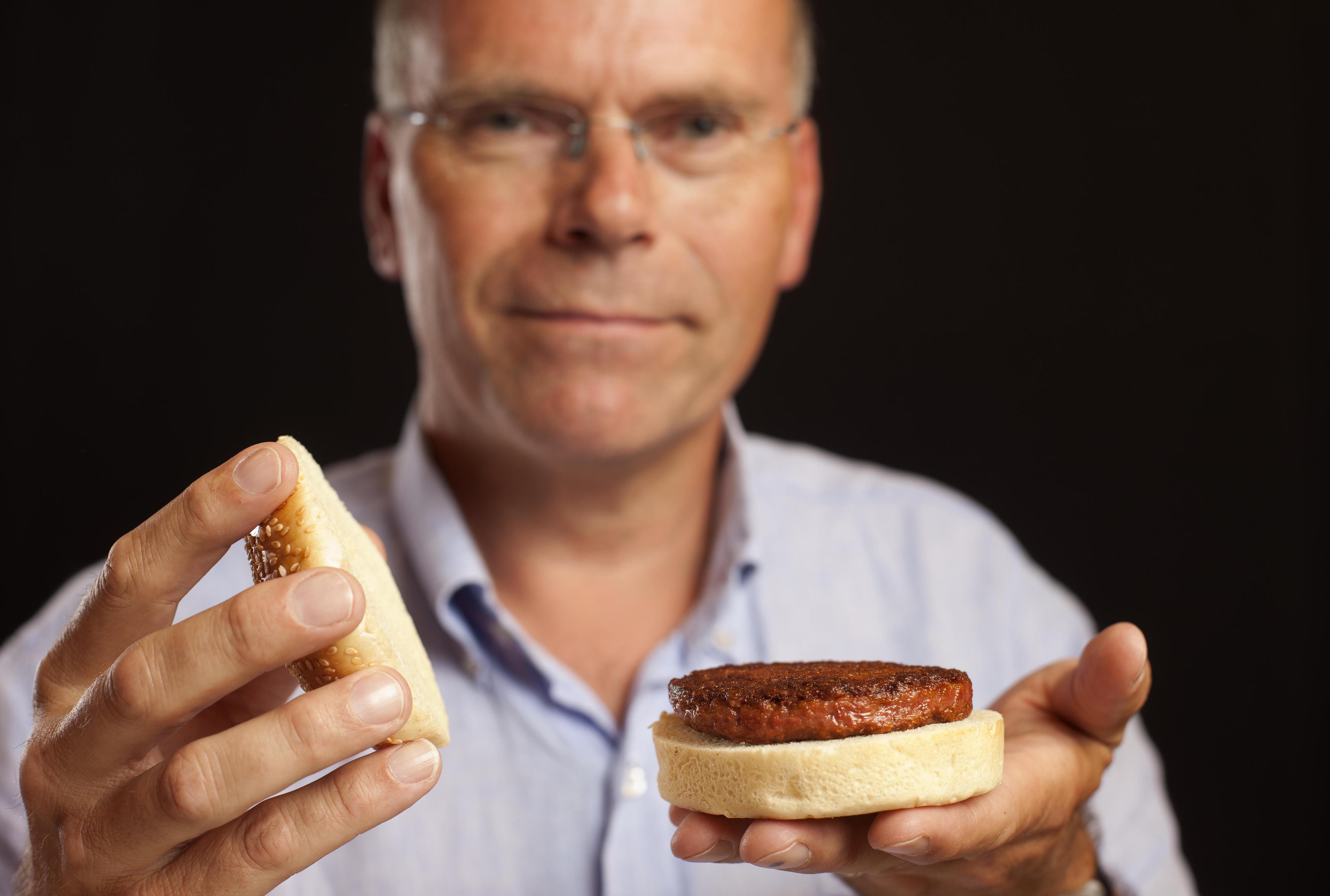
- Post with the first cell-cultured hamburger, 2013
- Born: 20 July 1957 (age 69); Amsterdam, Netherlands
- Education: Utrecht University
- Occupations: Professor of Vascular Physiology and Tissue Engineering; CSO of Mosa Meat
- Employer: Maastricht University
- Organisation: Mosa Meat
- Known for: Cultured meat research

Marcus Johannes "Mark" Post (born 20 July 1957) is a Dutch pharmacologist who is Professor of Vascular Physiology at Maastricht University and (until 2010) Professor of Angiogenesis in Tissue Engineering at the Eindhoven University of Technology. On 5 August 2013, he was the first in the world to present a proof of concept for cultured meat. In 2020, he was listed by Prospect as the ninth-greatest thinker for the COVID-19 era.

== Education ==
Post received his medical degree from the Utrecht University in 1982 and trained for a PhD in Pulmonary Pharmacology, graduating from the Utrecht University in 1989.

== Early career ==
Post joined the KNAW Interuniversity Cardiology Institute of the Netherlands in 1989 before being appointed full-time Assistant Professor in Medicine at Harvard Medical School, Boston, MA (1998–2001). Five years later, he moved with his lab to Dartmouth Medical School, Hanover, NH, and was appointed Associate Professor of Medicine and of Physiology (2001–2010).

In July 2002, Post returned to the Netherlands as a Professor of Vascular Physiology at Maastricht University and Professor of Angiogenesis in Tissue Engineering at Eindhoven University of Technology (until 2010). Since January 2004, he has been Chair of Physiology and Vice Dean of Biomedical Technology at Maastricht University.

== Cultured meat research ==
Post lectures at the 2015 World Economic Forum on cultured meat.

As the Dutch government cut down subsidies for cultured meat development at the universities of Utrecht, Amsterdam and Eindhoven in 2009, jeopardising the Netherlands' international leading role, Maastricht University was able to attract an anonymous foreign investor (in 2013 revealed as Google co-founder Sergey Brin) and resume the research. In December 2011, Post and his team announced plans to conduct practical experiment into the production of lab-grown meat. They planned to produce a cultured hamburger by September 2012. The costs of the world's first in-vitro burger were 250,000 euros. Eventually, it was presented to the public, cooked and eaten on 5 August 2013 at a press conference in London. Austrian nutritional scientist Hanni Rützler judged it to be just like meat, although not yet as juicy.

In June 2013 and October 2015, Post claimed that in the future, it would be possible for citizens themselves to grow their own meat at home within a period of 7 to 9 weeks. Also in October 2015, Post and food technologist Peter Verstrate announced the launch of their new company Mosa Meat, which seeks to bring cultured meat on the market in 2020. Post estimated that if the traditional meat industry were to be entirely replaced by lab-grown meat, the global cattle population could be reduced from 0.5 billion to about 30,000.

In 2016 he was selected to join the SingularityU The Netherlands faculty due to his pioneering work in cultured meat and the sustainability of food production.

From April 2017 on, Post's team was experimenting with tanks of 25,000 litres to grow meat in. The scientists were looking for an alternative for the foetal calf serum (a by-product of animal agriculture) to grow the cells in to be able to operate independently from the regular meat industry.
