= Hilcona =

Food company from Liechtenstein

- Type: Aktiengesellschaft
- Industry: Food processing
- Founded: 1935
- Headquarters: Schaan, Liechtenstein
- Key people: Toni Hilti
- Products: Convenience food
- Revenue: CHF 500 million (2016)
- Number of employees: 2,000
- Website: hilcona.com

Hilcona AG, based in Schaan in the Principality of Liechtenstein, is an international food manufacturer.

== History ==
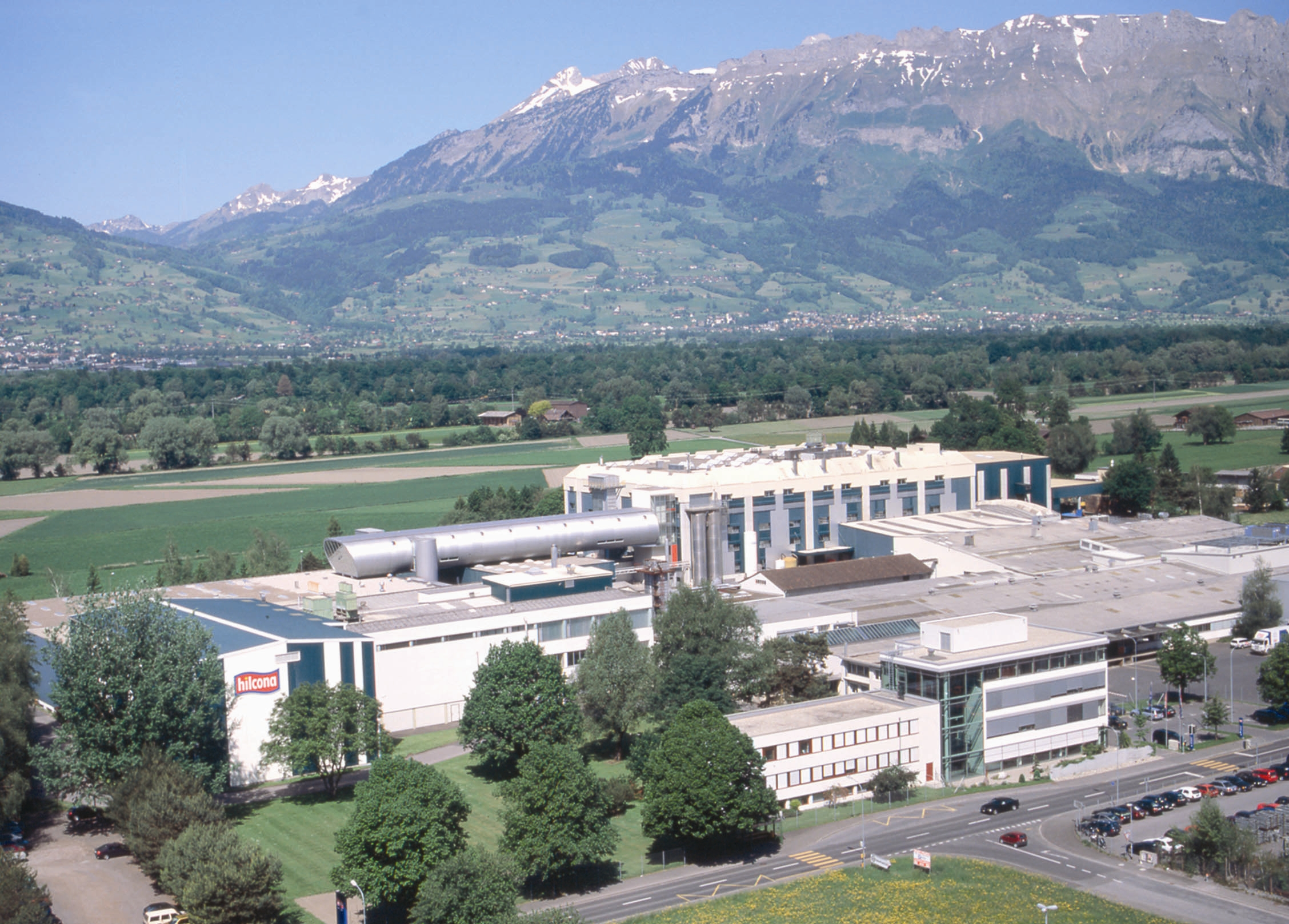
Headquarters of Hilcona in Schaan, Liechtenstein

Hilcona AG is a food processing company in Liechtenstein and one of the most important employers in the country. The company was founded by Toni Hilti in 1935 as Scana Konservenfabrik AG and operates from its headquarters in Schaan, the most populous town of Liechtenstein. Two of Toni Hilti's brothers, Eugen and Martin Hilti, would later found the power tool maker Hilti in 1941. In 1961 Hilcona began with the production of frozen food which makes up for 63% of Hilcona's revenue today. Ten years later, the founder's sons, Ekkehard and Jürgen Hilti, joined the management team. They developed new product ideas due to the worlds changing eating habits, as a result of which the company was renamed HILCONA, derived from Hilti Convenience Nahrungsmittel.

As the first company in Switzerland and Liechtenstein, Hilcona produced fresh pasta industrially from 1984 and therefore opened up a completely new market. Today, ready meals account for 63 percent of sales and have become the core business. In addition, the company manufactured frozen meals for the food service sector and industrial needs and produced canned products for the Swiss market.

After the introduction of fresh products in Switzerland, the next step was to expand into other European countries. A subsidiary was founded in Germany in 1988, followed by a branch in France in 1991.

In 1993, Hilcona AG took over Deni's Pizza in Yverdon-les-Bains (CH). 6 years later (1999) Hilcona AG began operating its fresh pizza factory in Orbe (CH).

At the beginning of the new millennium, Hilcona AG also advertised in Germany.

At the beginning of 2011, the Swiss Bell AG, which is majority owned by the Coop cooperative, took a 49% stake in Hilcona AG with the option to take over a further 2% (i.e. the majority ownership) in 2015.

In 2012, Gastro Star AG and schwarz viva AG, which had been associated with each other since 2011, were taken over, including the production sites in Dällikon and Villigen where they produce salad and vegetable products.

On 1 May 2015, Bell AG exercised its option to acquire a further 2% shareholding. Since then it has held the majority stake with 51%. The only other shareholder was the Toni Hilti family trust. The Zurich-based Eisberg Group, acquired by Bell on 1 April 2016, which produces lettuce with 400 employees in Switzerland and Eastern Europe and has a turnover of CHF 55 million, was organizationally attached to Gastro Star as an independent Hilcona subsidiary.

On 1 January 2017, the former Frostag Food-Centrum AG in Landquart was taken over 100% by Hilcona AG and developed into an internal start-up called Hilcona Taste Factory.

On 30 May 2017, Bell AG took over the 49% stake held by the Toni Hilti family trust in Hilcona AG with retrospective effect from 1 January 2017. In 2019, Bell AG announced that it intended to invest a total of CHF 120 million in several sectors in the Hilcona site in Schaan.

As of 1 August 2021, Hilcona took over the sandwich business from Aryzta Switzerland, including the production site in Schlieren. Hilcona is a.o. Member of IG Bio and SwissPasta. The members of SwissPasta are committed to the unhindered procurement of durum wheat, which is usually imported from the USA and Canada.

== Products ==
The company produces fresh pasta and sauces, frozen foods, ready meals, canned foods and sandwiches for the retail, foodservice and impulse markets. The most important export markets today are Germany, France, Austria, Great Britain and Benelux.

In April 2019, Hilcona launched a plant-based burger under the label The Green Mountain.

== Production sites ==
Hilcona AG has four production sites: Schaan (FL), Orbe (CH), Landquart (CH) and Bad Wünnenberg (DE). In addition to the group management, the central administration as well as the production of fresh, frozen and other non-perishable finished products are located in Schaan. There has been a fresh produce plant in Orbe in western Switzerland since 1999, in which, in addition to pizzas for the food retail trade, sandwiches and salads, Hilcona water and green tea are produced. The Hilcona Taste Factory in Landquart has established itself above all as a vegetarian competence center (hummus, tofu) and as a specialist for regional hand-made specialties. Hilcona took over and converted the plant in Bad Wünnenberg from Bell Germany in 2019.

== Criticism ==
In February 2013, undeclared amounts of horse meat were detected in some ready-made meat products on the market, including those from Hilcona (see 2013 horse meat scandal). Hilcona's direct upstream supplier was the German meat processor Vossko. The cooperation with the supplier was terminated immediately, prompting the conversion of all branded products to 100 percent Swiss beef.

== See also ==
- Economy of Liechtenstein
