= Yaakov Nahmias =

- יעקב נחמיאס
- Born: Apr, 1974; Tel Aviv, Israel
- Education: Technion – Israel Institute of Technology, University of Minnesota
- Awards: NIH Research Scientist Development Award (K01), 2008; Golda Meir Fellowship, 2009; Marie Curie Reintegration Grant, 2010; European Research Council Starting Grant, 2011; Rappaport Prize for Biomedical Sciences, 2014; European Research Council Consolidator Grant, 2016;
- Scientific career
- Fields: Liver Biology, Systems Biology, Biomedical Engineering
- Workplaces: Hebrew University of Jerusalem, Harvard Medical School
- Doctoral advisor: David Odde

Yaakov "Koby" Nahmias is an Israeli biomedical engineer and entrepreneur. Nahmias is a professor at the Hebrew University of Jerusalem and an affiliated member of the NIH-funded BioMEMS Resource Center at Massachusetts General Hospital.

Nahmias is the founding director of the Alexander Grass Center for Bioengineering. He is a co-founder of Israel's BioDesign Medical Innovation program, recently listed as a major reason for Boston Scientific's continued investment in Israel.

In 2014, he won the Rappaport Prize for Biomedical Sciences for his “groundbreaking work on liver tissue engineering” and the “development of nanotechnology therapies for the treatment of diabetes”.

Nahmias edited a book titled Microdevices in Biology and Medicine, and is currently serving as a technology consultant for L’Oreal, and a member of the European Research Council panel for applied life sciences and biotechnology.

In 2018, Nahmias became the co-founder and chief scientific officer of Future Meat Technologies.

== Career ==
Yaakov Nahmias received his B.Sc. in Chemical Engineering and Biology from the Technion – Israel Institute of Technology, graduating Magna Cum Laude. He completed his PhD at the University of Minnesota with David Odde, and his postdoctoral training at Harvard Medical School with Martin Yarmush. In 2006, he became an independent investigator at Harvard Medical School, winning a NIH Research Scientist Development Award (K01). Nahmias moved to the Hebrew University of Jerusalem in 2009, where he won two major European Research Council (ERC) Starting and Consolidator Grants, and founded the Alexander Grass Center for Bioengineering. In 2010, Nahmias became a Golda Meir fellow and a member of the ERC Starting Grant panel on applied life sciences and biotechnology (LS9). In 2012, Nahmias together with Chaim Lotan, established BioDesign Israel, a multi-disciplinary program in medical innovation taught at the Hebrew University of Jerusalem and its affiliated Hadassah Medical Center.

== Research ==
Nahmias is a liver biologist and a biomedical engineer who took part in the development of Lodamin, the first oral, broad-spectrum angiogenesis inhibitor and the first decellularization of an intact liver for transplantation. His own work showed that the Hepatitis C Virus (HCV) assembles on VLDL and that its production is blocked by the grapefruit flavonoid naringenin. Nahmias' work is leading to a growing understanding of the role of diet and nutrition on liver metabolism, including the first demonstration that gut bacteria affect liver development after birth, and explaining the toxic effects of acetaminophen using liver-on-chip technology.

== Personal life ==
Nahmias is married to Michal Haimov, an attorney specializing in real estate and securities. The couple met at the University of Minnesota, are currently living in Eden Prairie and have three children.
