= Bell Food Group =

Swiss food company

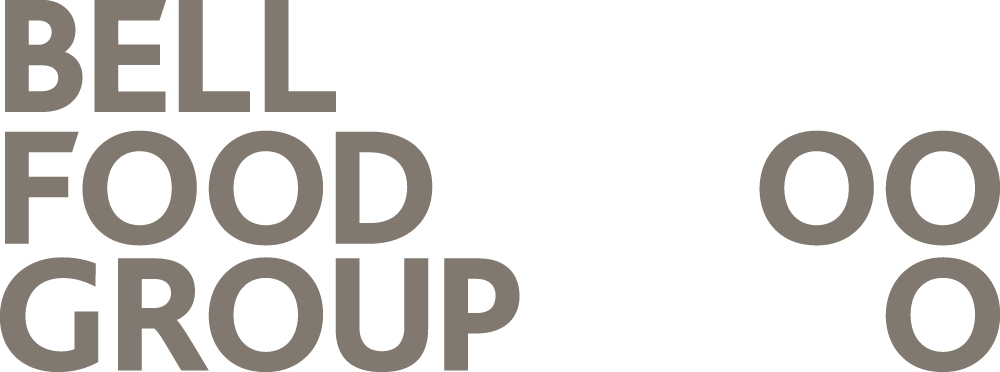
- Type: Aktiengesellschaft
- Traded as: SIX: BELL
- ISIN: CH0315966322
- Headquarters: Basel, Switzerland
- Number of locations: 65 (September 2020)
- Number of employees: 12,195 (September 2020)
- Website: bellfoodgroup.com

The Bell Food Group is the leading meat processor and manufacturer of convenience products in Switzerland. The company was founded in 1869 by Samuel Bell in Basel, where its headquarters is located. Its range of products includes meat, poultry, charcuterie, seafood and convenience products. Brands include Bell, Abraham, ZIMBO, Môssieur Polette and Hilcona. The Bell Food Group has 65 locations in 15 European countries and employs 11,960 people, as of 2019.

== History ==
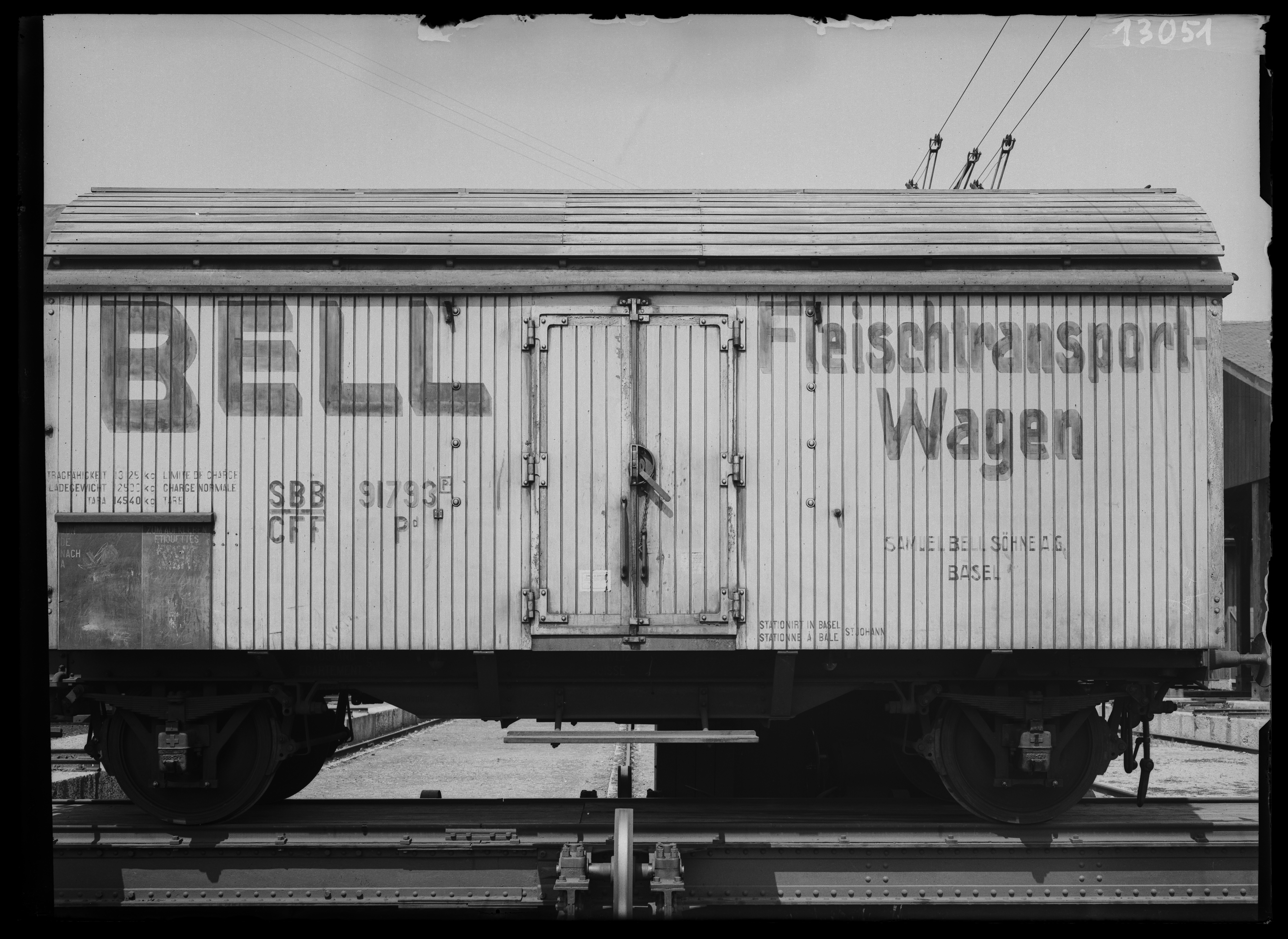
Bell on a railway waggon (1915)

On 29 March 1869, Samuel Bell-Roth (1840-1920) opened "Ochsenmetzg" (ox butchery) at Streitgasse 13 in Basel. The first store opened two decades later. The Samuel Bell Söhne company was founded in 1899 by Samuel Bell-Roth, Eduard Bell, Samuel Bell-Vollenweider and Rudolf Bell. It was converted into a stock corporation in 1907. In the same year, an area was acquired at Elsässerstrasse 174–188 in Basel, which still serves as the headquarters and production site today.

As early as 1912, Bell was the largest meat producer in Switzerland and one year later it entered into an alliance ("Bell Alliance") with what was then the Association of Swiss Consumers (now Coop).

The group of companies was converted into a holding company in 1999. In 2001, Bell took over all Coop butchers' headquarters. In 2002/2003, Bell took over SEG-Poulets AG in Zell (LU) and integrated it into Bell Holding. The chicken producers from Bell are united in the Mästerorganisation SEG (Organization of fatteners, MOSEG for short). Bell spun off its own butcher shops in 2004 by means of a management buyout. In 2005, Bell brought the retail division (Bell Gastro Service and Grande Boucherie du Molard), with the exception of Bell Catering, into the Transgourmet joint venture, which was newly founded between Coop and the German Rewe Group.

In 2006, Bell entered into foreign markets, at first by exporting meat to Luxembourg, and later by acquiring French charcuterie manufacturer Polette, and German sausage manufacturer Abraham. On 1 October 2008, Bell AG acquired a 70 percent stake in the German meat products manufacturer Zimbo in Bochum. In November 2008, 75 percent of Abraham Schinken was acquired. At the end of 2009, all catering activities were sold to the SV Group. With effect from the beginning of 2011, Bell incorporated the Convenience division into the Liechtenstein company Hilcona. In return, Bell took a 49% stake in Hilcona AG (the other of the two Hilcona shareholders were the Toni Hilti family trust). On 1 May 2015, Bell redeemed the agreed option for a further two percent of Hilcona AG and thus became the majority shareholder with 51 percent.

The majority shareholder of Bell Food Group AG, which is listed on the SIX Swiss Exchange, is the Coop Group Cooperative based in Basel, with a share of 66.29 percent. Another shareholder with a 3.01 percent stake is J. Safra Sarasin Investmentfonds AG (a subsidiary of Bank J. Safra Sarasin). The rest of the shares are in free float (as of 31 December 2014). In June 2022, Coop announced that it intended to increase its stake to 66.67 percent.

In 2014, the German Federal Cartel Office imposed a three-digit million fine on 21 sausage companies in the so-called sausage cartel, including Bell Deutschland, for illegal price fixing. On 23 June 2017, the German Federal Cartel Office dropped the proceedings against Bell Deutschland.

With effect from 1 March 2016, Austria's largest poultry meat producer, Hubers Landhendl, was taken over. On 1 April 2016, Bell acquired the Zurich-based Eisberg Group, which produces lettuce, employs 400 people in Switzerland and Eastern Europe and has a turnover of CHF 55 million. Also in 2016, Bell took over Cher-Mignon SA, which specializes in charcuterie and is based in the Valais municipality of Chermignon and has annual sales of CHF 13 million. On 1 October 2016, Bell acquired Geiser AG, which specializes in supplying caterers and is based in Schlieren (ZH). With 120 employees, the company achieves annual sales of around CHF 45 million.

Investments planned in Oensingen for the replacement of Bell's existing cattle slaughterhouse on Dünnernstrasse and the location of the pork cutting plant were not well received by the Swiss Traffic Club (VCS). The VCS criticized that the parking garage was being built for all of the future 1,200 employees. In the traffic forecast of the environmental impact report, it is assumed that all employees travel to work individually in a motor vehicle. As a result, the VCS argues that carpooling, public transport users or non-motorized traffic with bicycles and pedestrians were not taken into account in these calculations.

In 2018, Bell acquired the controlling stake in Swiss soup and sauce producer Hügli. by taking 50.2% of the share of Dr. A. Stoffel Holding and with it 65% of the voting rights in Hügli Holding. Hügli is to be continued as an independent business unit within Bell. Also in 2018, Bell took a 2 million euro stake in the Dutch company Mosa Meat; which plans to bring in vitro meat to market by 2021. The company now also offers meat substitutes.

On the night of 20-21 November 2018, the slaughterhouse in Oensingen was occupied by 134 activists from the animal rights movement 269 Libération Animale. The occupation was cleared by the police and more than 100 penal orders were issued by the public prosecutor's office. 34 activists have appealed the penal orders they received for coercion, trespassing and hindrance of an official act and are now facing court appearances.

At the end of February 2019, it was announced that former Federal Councilor Doris Leuthard was to take a seat on the Board of Directors of the Bell Food Group on 16 April 2019. At the Annual General Meeting on 23 March 2021, Hansueli Loosli resigned from the Board of Directors of the Bell Food Group after twelve years in office as Chairman. His successor was the previous Vice Chairman Joos Sutter. Doris Leuthard was elected as the new Vice President.

Bell Schweiz AG is a member of IG Bio. In 2022, Bell took over the Schötz based hatchery Stöckli AG in Ohmstal (Vertical Integration).

== Organization ==
The headquarters of the Bell Food Group is in Basel, Switzerland. In July 2019, the Bell Food Group was divided into three divisions: Bell Switzerland, Bell International, and Convenience and Services. The Bell International division is made up of Bell Germany, Bell Western/Eastern Europe and Hubers/Sütag divisions. The Convenience division comprises Eisberg, Hilcona and Hügli.

Around 8,000 employees generated consolidated sales of CHF 2.6 billion in the fiscal year 2014. Bell is listed on the SIX Swiss Exchange. The majority shareholder of Bell is Coop, one of Switzerland's largest retail and wholesale companies.

In June 2022, the Bell Food Group was ranked 53rd in the list of the largest Swiss companies. In Switzerland, Bell is the second largest market participant in poultry production, with a market share of 32.7% (as of 2018), after Micarna (market share of 41.5%) and ahead of FRIFAG Märwil AG (Frifag for short; market share of 14%).

Bell Schweiz AG is a member of the industry organization Proviande. Bell is also represented by Marco Tschanz on the board of directors of Centravo Holding AG, a group of companies specializing in the processing and disposal of slaughterhouse by-products.
