= Pilot line =

A pilot line is a pre-commercial production line that produces small volumes of new technology-based products, or employs new production technology, as a step towards the commercialisation of the new technology.

Pilot lines help bridge the gap between research and commercialisation, which is caused by the fact that new technology that has been proved only in a laboratory usually is not ready yet for application. They help bridge this gap in two ways:

- Pilot lines promote learning about a technology at a higher level of sophistication than in laboratories, that is, a level at which the technology is integrated in an early prototype and tested in an environment that is representative of the final operating environment.
- Pilot lines help reduce risk by providing information on the new technology and its application in many respects, including its technical feasibility, manufacturability, costs, and market and social acceptance.

In terms of the Technology readiness level framework, pilot plants validate production technology at levels TRL5-6: validation and demonstration of technology in a relevant environment.

== Terminology ==
A word similar to pilot line is pilot plant. Essentially, pilot plants and pilot lines perform the same functions, but 'pilot plant' is used in the context of (bio)chemical and advanced materials production systems, whereas 'pilot line' is used for new technology in general, e.g. by the European Union.

== Example ==
An industrial pilot line for micro-fabricated medical devices is established as part of the ECSEL JU project InForMed. The pilot line will be hosted by a large industrial end-user, and is specifically targeted and equipped to bridge the gap between concept creation and full-scale production.
