= Hanni Rützler =

Austrian nutritional scientist

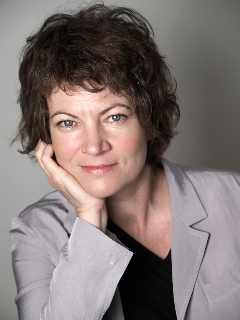
- Rützler, 2006.
- Born: 9 February 1962 (age 64); Bregenz, Vorarlberg, Austria
- Education: University of Vienna
- Occupations: Nutritional scientist, food trends researcher and health psychologist
- Spouse: Wolfgang Reiter

Hanni Rützler (born 9 February 1962) is an Austrian nutritional scientist, food trends researcher, author and health psychologist.

== Life ==
=== Education ===
Hanni Rützler was born in 1962 in Bregenz, the capital of Vorarlberg. She received her secondary education at the Sacré-Coeur in Bregenz, obtaining her Matura in 1981. After a one-year study visit in the United States at Michigan Technological University, Houghton, she began studying home economics and nutritional sciences, psychology and sociology, as well as food and biotechnology at the University of Vienna (completed as Master of Natural Sciences in 1988). Aside from an apprenticeship in person-centered interviewing (completed in 1991), she was an associate at the interdisciplinary research project "Ernährungskultur in Österreich" ("Nutritional Culture in Austria") at the Institut für Kulturstudien (IKUS). Since then, she has been working as a freelance nutritional scientist, a consultant of food & beverage enterprises and a food trends researcher.

=== Career ===
Rützler is the founder and leader of the futurefoodstudio in Vienna. She authors reference books and has been an advisor at the Zukunftsinstitut ("Future Institute") of Matthias Horx in Frankfurt am Main since 2004.

Rützler is a frequent speaker at international meetings and conferences (for example in Berlin, Zürich, Johannesburg and Dubai), as a workshop and seminar leader as well as a nutrition expert on the radio, on television and in written media.

She is the co-founder of the Verband der Ernährungswissenschafter Österreichs (VEÖ, "Association of Nutritional Scientists of Austria") and was from 1999 until 2005 the vice-president of the Österreichische Gesellschaft für Ernährung (ÖGE, "Austrian Society for Nutrition"). She was a lecturer at the Medical University of Graz (college course Public Health) and is a member of numerous scientific advisory committees (VEÖ, Forum Ernährung heute, Denkwerk Zukunft, amongst others).

=== Cultured meat test ===
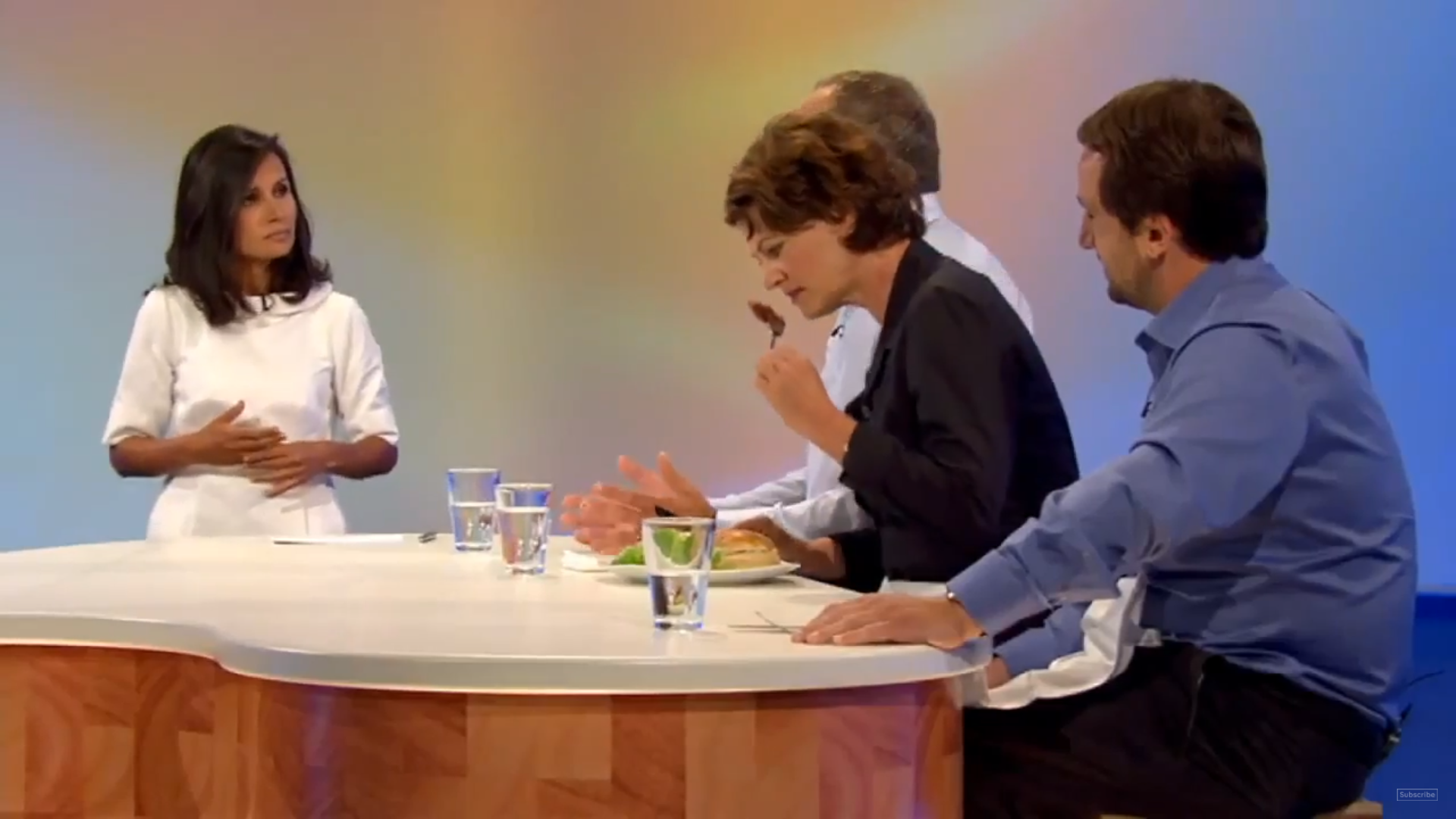
Rützler tastes the world's first cultured hamburger, 5 August 2013.

On 5 August 2013, Rützler took part in food testing the world's first lab-grown burger, which was cooked and eaten at a news conference in London. Scientists from Maastricht University in the Netherlands, led by professor Mark Post, had taken stem cells from a cow and grown them into strips of muscle which they then combined to make a burger. Tissue for the London demonstration was cultivated in May 2013, using about 20,000 thin strips of cultured muscle tissue. Funding of around €250,000 came from an anonymous donor later revealed to be Sergey Brin. The burger was cooked by chef Richard McGeown of Couch's Great House Restaurant, Polperro, Cornwall, and tasted by critics Rützler and Josh Schonwald, as well as lead researcher Post. Rützler stated,

There is really a bite to it, there is quite some flavour with the browning. I know there is no fat in it so I didn't really know how juicy it would be, but there is quite some intense taste; it's close to meat, it's not that juicy, but the consistency is perfect. This is meat to me... It's really something to bite on and I think the look is quite similar.

Rützler added that even in a blind trial she would have taken the product for meat rather than a soya copy.

=== Personal life ===
Rützler is married to cultural scholar, playwright and journalist Wolfgang Reiter and lives in Vienna and Primmersdorf in Lower Austria. She is a flexitarian.

== Publications ==
Hanni Rützler speaks at the 2016 Swiss Food Service Forum.

- Bewusst essen – gesund leben. Ueberreuter, Vienna 1995, ISBN 3-8000-3563-4.
- Ist mein Kind zu dick? Gewichtsreduktion und gesundes Essverhalten bei Kindern und Erwachsenen leicht gemacht. htp, Vienna 1997, ISBN 3-7004-3751-X.
- Future Food – Die 18 wichtigsten Trends für die Esskultur der Zukunft. Zukunftsinstitut, Frankfurt am Main 2003, ISBN 3-937131-13-2.
- Was essen wir morgen? – 13 Food Trends der Zukunft. Springer, Vienna, New York 2005, ISBN 3-211-21535-2.
- Kinder lernen essen - Strategien gegen das Zuviel. Krenn, Vienna 2007, ISBN 978-3-902351-94-2.
- Anja Kirig, Hanni Rützler: Food-Styles. Zukunftsinstitut, Frankfurt am Main 2007, ISBN 978-3-938284-34-6.
- Harry Gatterer, Hanni Rützler et al.: Österreich 2025 - Trend- und Chancenfelder in und für Österreich. Zukunftsinstitut, Vienna 2010, ISBN 978-3-938284-56-8.
- Hanni Rützler, Wolfgang Reiter: Food Change – 7 Leitlinien für eine neue Esskultur. Krenn, Vienna 2010, ISBN 978-3-99005-031-6.
- Hanni Rützlers FOODREPORT 2014. Zukunftsinstitut, Frankfurt am Main 2013, ISBN 978-3-938284-76-6.
- Hanni Rützlers FOODREPORT 2015. Zukunftsinstitut, Frankfurt am Main 2014, ISBN 978-3-938284-86-5.
- Hanni Rützler, Wolfgang Reiter: Muss denn Essen Sünde sein? Orientierung im Dschungel der Ernährungsideologien. Brandstätter, Vienna 2015, ISBN 978-3-85033-857-8.
- Hanni Rützlers FOODREPORT 2016. Zukunftsinstitut, Frankfurt am Main 2015, ISBN 978-3-945647-00-4.
