= Pilot plant =

Pre-commercial production system

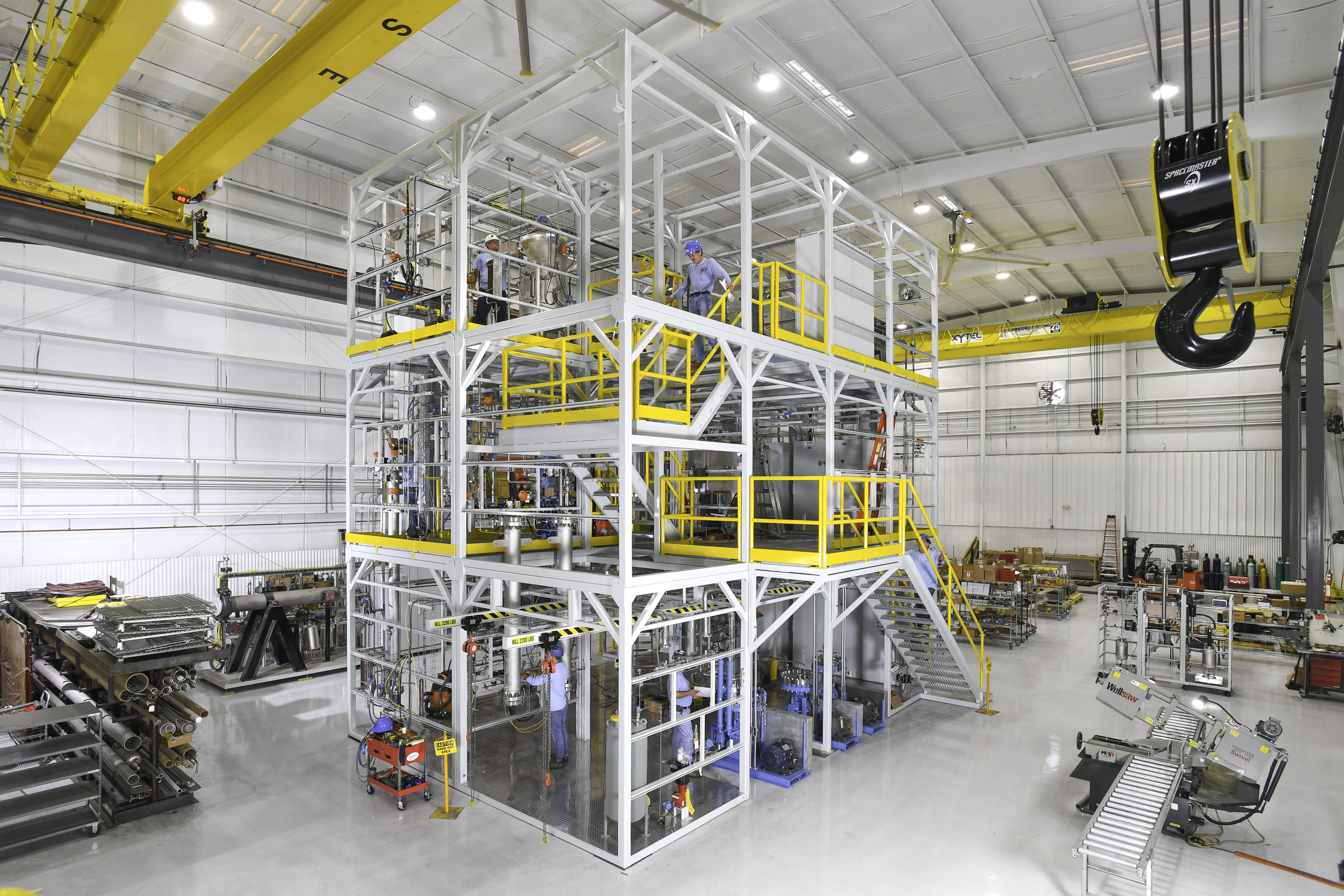
Large pilot plant under construction

A pilot plant is a pre-commercial production system that employs new production technology and/or produces small volumes of new technology-based products, mainly for the purpose of learning about the new technology. The knowledge obtained is then used for design of full-scale production systems and commercial products, as well as for identification of further research objectives and support of investment decisions. Other (non-technical) purposes include gaining public support for new technologies and questioning government regulations. Pilot plant is a relative term in the sense that pilot plants are typically smaller than full-scale production plants, but are built in a range of sizes. Also, as pilot plants are intended for learning, they typically are more flexible, possibly at the expense of economy. Some pilot plants are built in laboratories using stock lab equipment, while others require substantial engineering efforts, cost millions of dollars, and are custom-assembled and fabricated from process equipment, instrumentation and piping. They can also be used to train personnel for a full-scale plant. Pilot plants tend to be smaller compared to demonstration plants.

== Terminology ==
A word similar to pilot plant is pilot line. Essentially, pilot plants and pilot lines perform the same functions, but 'pilot plant' is used in the context of (bio)chemical and advanced materials production systems, whereas 'pilot line' is used for new technology in general. The term 'kilo lab' is also used for small pilot plants referring to the expected output quantities.

== Risk management ==
Pilot plants are used to reduce the risk associated with construction of large process plants. They do so in several ways:

- Computer simulations and semi-empirical methods are used to determine the limitations of the pilot scale system. These mathematical models are then tested in a physical pilot-scale plant. Various modeling methods are used for scale-up. These methods include:
  - Chemical similitude studies
  - Mathematical modeling
    - Chemical process simulation
    - Finite Elemental Analysis (FEA)
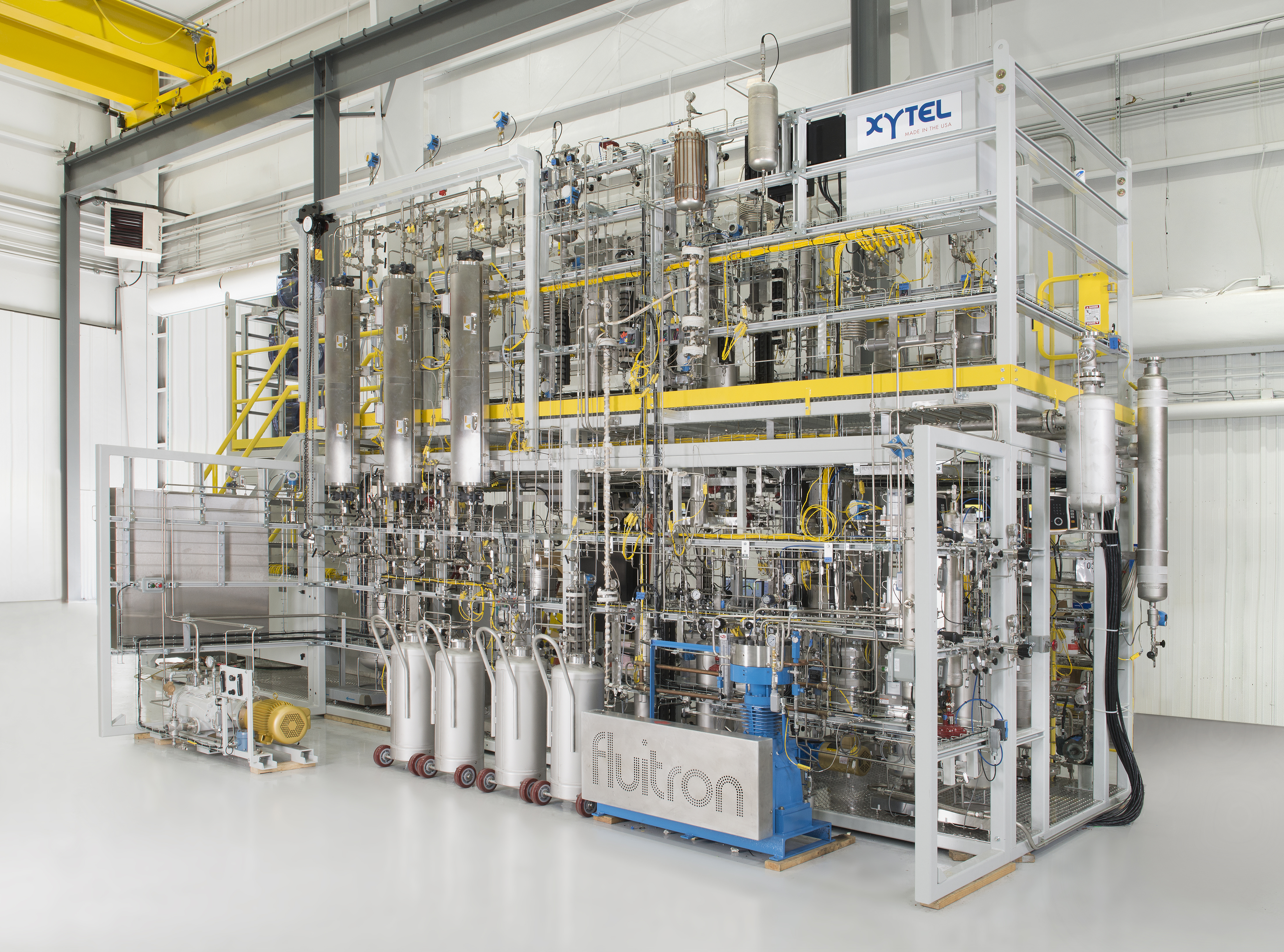
      Hydrocracking pilot plant
    - Computational Fluid Dynamics (CFD)

These theoretical modeling methods return the following:
- Finalized mass and energy balances
- Optimized system design and capacity
- Equipment requirements
- System limitations
- The basis for determining the cost to build the pilot module

- They are substantially less expensive to build than full-scale plants. The business does not put as much capital at risk on a project that may be inefficient or unfeasible. Further, design changes can be made more cheaply at the pilot scale and kinks in the process can be worked out before the large plant is constructed.
- They provide valuable data for design of the full-scale plant. Scientific data about reactions, material properties, corrosiveness, for instance, may be available, but it is difficult to predict the behavior of a process of any complexity. Engineering data from other process may be available, but this data can not always be clearly applied to the process of interest. Designers use data from the pilot plant to refine their design of the production scale facility.

If a system is well defined and the engineering parameters are known, pilot plants are not used. For instance, a business that wants to expand production capacity by building a new plant that does the same thing as an existing plant may choose to not use a pilot plant.

Additionally, advances in process simulation on computers have increased the confidence of process designers and reduced the need for pilot plants. However, they are still used as even state-of-the-art simulation cannot accurately predict the behavior of complex systems.

== Scale dependence of plant properties ==
As a system increases in size, system properties that depend on quantity of matter (with extensive properties) may change. The surface area to liquid ratio in a chemical plant is a good example of such a property. On a small chemical scale, in a flask, say, there is a relatively large surface area to liquid ratio. However, if the reaction in question is scaled up to fit in a 500-gallon tank, the surface area to liquid ratio becomes much smaller. As a result of this difference in surface area to liquid ratio, the exact nature of the thermodynamics and the reaction kinetics of the process change in a non-linear fashion. This is why a reaction in a beaker can behave vastly differently from the same reaction in a large-scale production process.

=== Other factors ===
Other factors that may change during the transformation to a production scale include:

- Reaction kinetics
- Chemical equilibrium
- Material properties
- Fluid dynamics
- Thermodynamics
- Equipment selection
- Agitation
- Uniformity / homogeneity

After data has been collected from operation of a pilot plant, a larger production-scale facility may be built. Alternatively, a demonstration plant, which is typically bigger than a pilot plant, but smaller than a full-scale production plant, may be built to demonstrate the commercial feasibility of the process. Businesses sometimes continue to operate the pilot plant in order to test ideas for new products, new feedstocks, or different operating conditions. Alternatively, they may be operated as production facilities, augmenting production from the main plant.

== Bench scale vs pilot vs demonstration ==
The differences between bench scale, pilot scale and demonstration scale are strongly influenced by industry and application. Some industries use pilot plant and demonstration plant interchangeably. Some pilot plants are built as portable modules that can be easily transported as a contained unit.

For batch processes, in the pharmaceutical industry for example, bench scale is typically conducted on samples 1–20 kg or less, whereas pilot scale testing is performed with samples of 20–100 kg. Demonstration scale is essentially operating the equipment at full commercial feed rates over extended time periods to prove operational stability.

For continuous processes, in the petroleum industry for example, bench scale systems are typically microreactor or CSTR systems with less than 1000 mL of catalyst, studying reactions and/or separations on a once-through basis. Pilot plants will typically have reactors with catalyst volume between 1 and 100 litres, and will often incorporate product separation and gas/liquid recycle with the goal of closing the mass balance. Demonstration plants, also referred to as semi-works plants, will study the viability of the process on a pre-commercial scale, with typical catalyst volumes in the 100 - 1000 litre range. The design of a demonstration scale plant for a continuous process will closely resemble that of the anticipated future commercial plant, albeit at a much lower throughput, and its goal is to study catalyst performance and operating lifetime over an extended period, while generating significant quantities of product for market testing.

In the development of new processes, the design and operation of the pilot and demonstration plant will often run in parallel with the design of the future commercial plant, and the results from pilot testing programs are key to optimizing the commercial plant flowsheet. It is common in cases where process technology has been successfully implemented that the savings at the commercial scale resulting from pilot testing will significantly outweigh the cost of the pilot plant itself.

== Steps to creating a custom pilot plant ==
Custom pilot plants are commonly designed either for research or commercial purposes. They can range in size from a small system with no automation and low flow, to a highly automated system producing relatively large amounts of products in a day. No matter the size, the steps to designing and fabricating a working pilot plant are the same. They are:

1. Pre-engineering - completing a process flow diagram (PFD), basic piping and instrumentation diagrams (P&ID's) and initial equipment layouts.
2. Engineering modeling and optimization - 2D and 3D models are created, using a simulation software to model the process parameters and scale the chemical processes. These modeling software help determine system limitations, non-linear chemical and physical changes, and potential equipment sizing. Mass and energy balances, finalized P&ID's and general arrangement drawings are produced.
3. Automation strategies for the system are developed (if needed). Controls system programming begins and will continue through fabrication and assembly
4. Fabrication and assembly - after an optimized design has been determined, the custom pilot is fabricated and assembled. Pilot plants can either be assembled on-site or off-site as modular skids that will be constructed and tested in a controlled environment.
5. Testing - testing of completed systems, including system controls, is conducted to ensure proper system function.
6. Installation and startup - if constructed offsite, pilot skids are installed onsite. After all equipment is in place, full system startup is completed by integrating the system with existing plant utilities and controls. Full operation is tested and affirmed.
7. Training - operator training is complete and full system documentation is handed over.

== See also ==
- Chemical engineering
- Operations research
- Process engineering
- List of cultured meat companies § Pilot plants

== Bibliography ==
- M. Levin (Editor), Pharmaceutical Process Scale-Up (Drugs and the Pharmaceutical), Informa Healthcare, 3rd edition, ISBN 978-1616310011 (2011)
- M. Lackner (Editor), Scale-up in Combustion, ProcessEng Engineering GmbH, Wien, ISBN 978-3-902655-04-2 (2009).
- M. Zlokarnik, Scale-up in Chemical Engineering, Wiley-VCH Verlag GmbH & Co. KGaA, 2nd edition, ISBN 978-3527314218 (2006).
- Richard Palluzi, Pilot Plants: Design, Construction and Operation, McGraw-Hill, February, 1992.
- Richard Palluzi, Pilot Plants, Chemical Engineering, March, 1990.
