= Bene Meat Technologies =

Czech cultured meat company

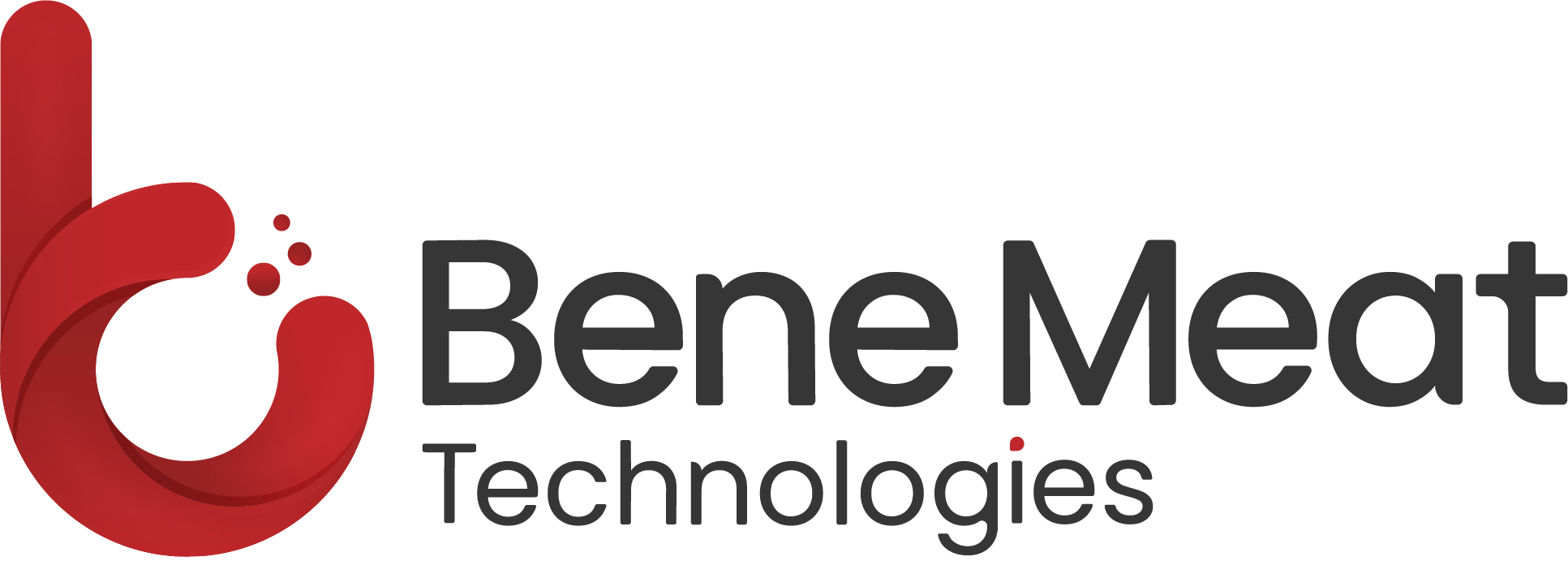

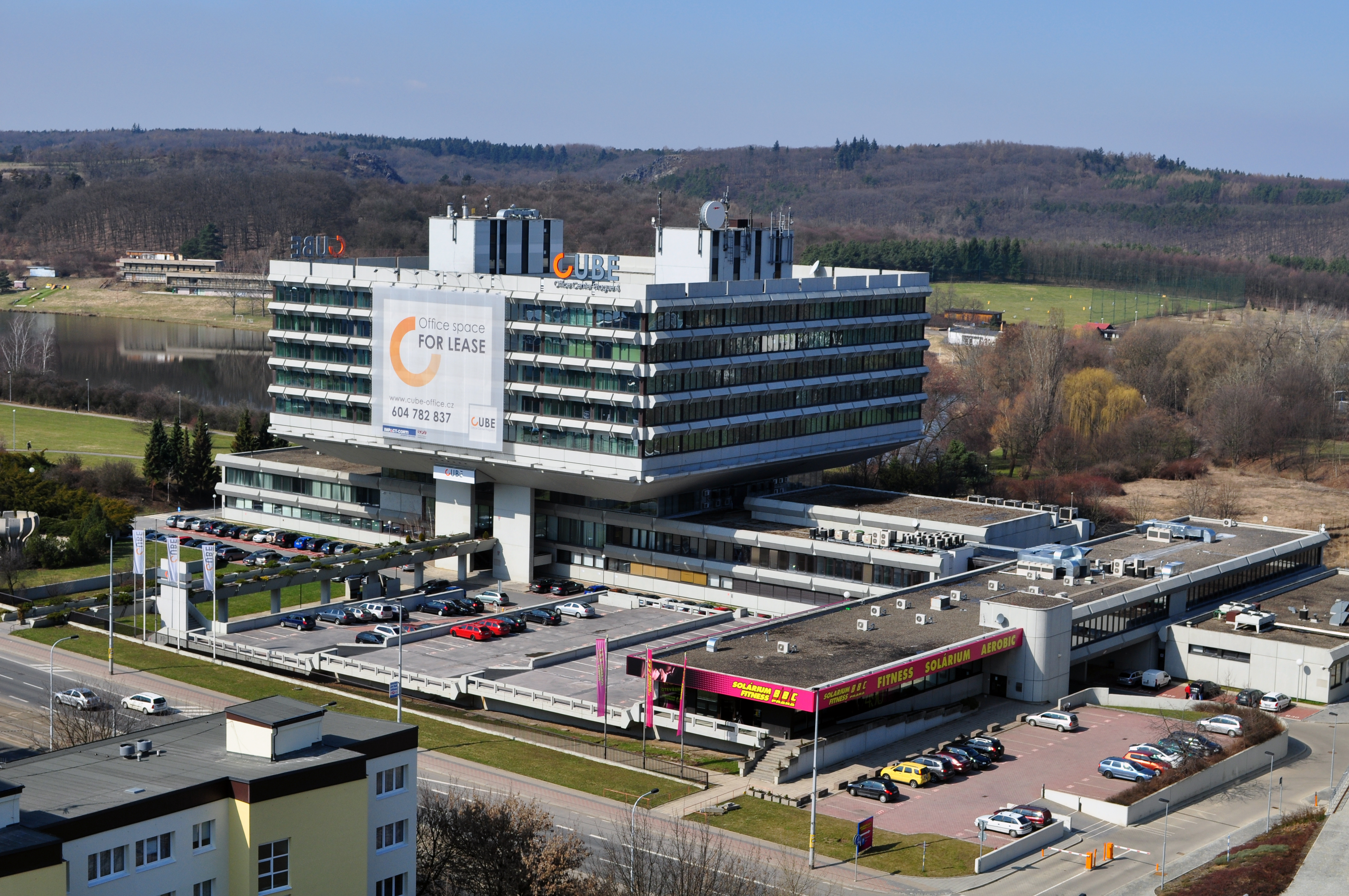
- Industry: Biotechnology
- Founded: 16.1.2020
- Headquarters: Kamenice, Czech Republic
- Website: https://www.benemeat.com/en (in English)

Bene Meat Technologies a.s. (BeneMeat) is a Czech biotechnology start-up focused on research and development of technology for the production of cultivated meat on an industrial scale. Rather than positioning itself as a producer of cultivated meat, the company acts as a technology partner, providing manufacturers with a complete technological ecosystem from cell line development and culture media, through bioprocess optimization, to scalable production. As part of its collaborations, Bene Meat also shares expert knowledge, including regulatory know-how, to help partners bring their products to market more efficiently.

The company cooperates with scientific institutions and companies in the Czech Republic and abroad. Bene Meat is headquartered in Prague, occupying several floors of the Cube office building in the Vokovice district.

== History ==
Bene Meat Technologies a.s. was founded in 2020 by Mgr. Roman Kříž, who is the project leader. The main biologist of the scientific team is Jiří Janoušek and one of the external scientists involved in the ongoing research is the immunologist Prof. RNDr. Jan Černý, Ph.D. In 2022, the BMT research team consisted of 70 scientists By 2025, the team had grown to include more than 100 members.

In 2024, the company received the Industrie Award as part of the Česká hlava project, in recognition of its innovative research and technology in cultivated meat. In 2025, the company was included in the prestigious FoodTech 500 ranking, which recognizes the world’s most innovative companies in the food and agri-tech sectors.

== Research objective ==
Developing a technology to produce cultured meat by propagating animal cells without using fetal bovine serum, ideally with growth factors from their own production. Bene Meat claims that their final technology will allow its operators to produce and offer the product at prices affordable to consumers.

In March 2023, the company said that the first cultured meat product launched on the market may not be fit for human consumption, but would be for pet food. However, Bene Meat states that the creation of meat meant for human consumption is one of their goals.

== Progress ==
BeneMeat is the first company registered in European Feed Materials Register for the production and sale of cultivated meat for pet food; specifically cat and dog food. BeneMeat claims to be the only entity in the world that can produce and sell this product for the pet food market. By 2024, BeneMeat plans to make several metric tons per day of cultivated meat meant for pet food.

In 2024, with the aim of demonstrating the sustainability of its cultivated meat process, BeneMeat commissioned a Life Cycle Assessment (LCA) of its production system. In 2026, a follow-up scientific study assessing the environmental impacts of this technology was published in the journal The International Journal of Life Cycle Assessment. The authors based their calculations on operational data from the pilot phase of the project and on manufacturing process models of the future industrial facility. The results confirmed a significant reduction in land use and lower greenhouse gas emissions compared to conventional meat production. According to the analysis, greenhouse gas emissions under the current production setup amount to 5.3 kg of CO₂ equivalent per kilogram of cultivated meat, which is lower than conventional beef and pork farming. Furthermore, the research models future technological optimizations that could reduce the carbon footprint to 3.3 kg CO₂ eq/kg. Achieving these targets would render the product more environmentally friendly than average European poultry production. The energy required to produce one kilogram of cultivated meat was calculated at 66 MJ, with the study projecting a future decline in consumption to 61.5 MJ.

In 2025, BeneMeat launched the Try & Share Program, in which participating dog owners tested pet food containing cultivated meat. According to data reported by the company, approximately 90% of participating dogs accepted the product during the trial.

In 2026, a research team from Ghent University, in collaboration with BeneMeat, published a study evaluating the digestibility and acceptance rate of cultivated meat-based feed in cats. The collected data demonstrated that nine out of ten tested cats accepted the diet without difficulty. Furthermore, the animals left fewer leftovers compared to the control group, which received a diet containing human-grade chicken meat. The body's capacity to digest and utilize nutrients from the cultivated meat was comparable to the chicken-based diet, with researchers noting no meaningful differences in protein or lipid absorption. Monitored physiological indicators, including body weight, muscle condition, and stool consistency, remained unchanged throughout the experiment.

At the 2026 Interzoo trade fair in Nuremberg, the Italian brand FORZA10 introduced a complete dog food named Coolty Meat, containing 26% cultivated meat produced by BeneMeat. The formula is designed as a single-protein diet and is free from antibiotics, hormones, and preservatives. Due to these characteristics, the product is primarily intended for dogs with food allergies and intolerances. BeneMeat published a peer-reviewed study on the safety parameters of cultivated meat in the journal Physiological Research. The paper, titled "Shaping the Future Plate: Exploring the Safety Concerns of Cultivated and Conventional Meat Production," reviews existing scientific literature regarding potential health and regulatory considerations of cell-cultivated food products in comparison to conventional meat, while outlining key areas for future empirical research.
