= Believer Meats =

Israeli food technology company

- Formerly: Future Meat Technologies (2018-2022)
- Type: Privately held company
- Industry: Food technology
- Founded: 2018
- Founder: Yaakov Nahmias
- Headquarters: Chicago, USA
- Website: believermeats.com

Believer Meats, was a biotechnology firm which produced cultivated meat from animal cells. Based in United States, its main office was located in Chicago, while its primary production facility was built in Wilson, NC. In November 2022, Future Meat Technologies rebranded to Believer Meats.

== History ==
Future Meat Technologies was founded in 2018 by Yaakov Nahmias, a biomedical engineering professor of the Hebrew University of Jerusalem. He became Future Meat's chief scientific officer. The company was founded in Israel and built a 10,700 square-foot facility in Rehovot, just south of Tel Aviv.

The company presented its cultured meat prototype to the public in 2019. In October 2019, it raised $14 million to build its pilot plant, and estimated that it could bring its products to the market in 2022. To achieve this, Future Meat stated in February 2020 that it sought to bring down the price of producing cultured meat to $10 per pound by 2022.

In January 2020, Quartz found around 30 cultured meat startups, and that Memphis Meats, Just Inc. and Future Meat Technologies were the most advanced because they were building pilot plants.

In June 2021, the construction of Future Meat's pilot plant in Rehovot was completed, and it entered into service. As of November 2021, the facility was capable of producing 500 kilograms of cultured meat per day, or 182,625 kilograms a year. That year it raised a Series B investment round of US$347M.

In December 2022, the company broke ground on a new factory in North Carolina. In 2024, the company partnered with GEA Group to co-develop cultured meat technologies.

In December 2025, Believer Meats' HR director stated that the company had ceased operations, shortly after receiving FDA and USDA approval and announcing the completion of its North Carolina facility.

== Technology ==
The company extracts cells from live animals. It cultures those cells in stainless steel fermenters, where they reproduce and develop into edible tissues. The company claims that reproduction rates are 10x greater than others, while generating 20% of their greenhouse gas emissions. Compared to animal husbandry, it uses 1% of the land and 4% of the water.

In 2021, it reduced the production cost of a cultured chicken breast from US$7.50 to $1.70, and a cultured chicken to $7.70/lb ($17.0/kg).
