= Aleph Farms =

Cellular agriculture company

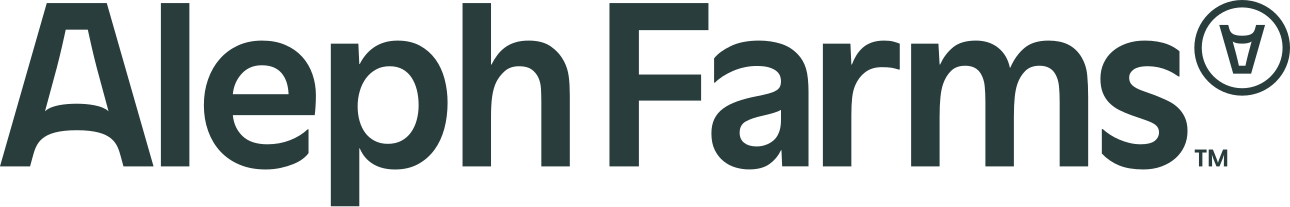
- Type: Private
- Industry: Cellular agriculture; Food technology
- Founded: 2017; 9 years ago
- Founder: Shulamit Levenberg; Didier Toubia
- Headquarters: Rehovot, Israel
- Key people: Didier Toubia (CEO)
- Number of employees: 150 (2023)
- Website: aleph-farms.com

Aleph Farms is a cellular agriculture company active in the food technology space. It was co-founded in 2017 by the Israeli food-tech incubator "The Kitchen Hub" of Strauss Group Ltd., and Prof. Shulamit Levenberg of the Faculty of Biomedical Engineering at Technion – Israel Institute of Technology and is headquartered in Rehovot, Israel.

== History ==
In December 2018, Aleph Farms released its prototype, a steak grown directly from cow cells. In February 2021, Aleph Farms unveiled the world's first cell-based ribeye steak, produced through 3D bioprinting.

In May 2019, the company announced a US$12M funding round led by Vis Vires New Protein. Other investors were Cargill and M-Industry (Industrial Group of Migros). In July 2021, the company received $105 million in a Series B investment round. The round was led by L Catterton's Growth Fund and DisruptAD, a sovereign fund based in Abu Dhabi. Other participants include Temasek, Skyviews Life Science and an international consortium of food giants Thai Union, BRF, and CJ CheilJedang. Additional participants include existing investors like Strauss Group, Cargill, Vis Vlires New Protein, Peregrine Ventures and CPT Capital.

In September 2021, actor and environmentalist Leonardo DiCaprio announced that he had funded Mosa Meat and Aleph Farms for undisclosed amounts of money, stating: 'One of the most impactful ways to combat the climate crisis is to transform our food system. Mosa Meat and Aleph Farms offer new ways to satisfy the world's demand for beef, while solving some of the most pressing issues of current industrial beef production.'

In January 2024, the company received the first approval by the Israeli Ministry of Health to sell lab-grown steaks in Israel. The steaks were rabbinically declared kosher. In 2024, the company also submitted (as the first one) an application in Thailand.

== Cost and scale ==
Aleph Farms aimed to reach price parity with conventional meat within five years from its initial market launch.

Aleph Farms has signed Memorandum of Understanding (MoU) with global food and meat companies to bring cultivated meat to local markets. The agreements were signed with BRF in Brazil, Mitsubishi Corporation in Japan, Thai Union in Thailand and CJ CheilJedang in South Korea.

In February 2022, Aleph Farms reportedly moved into a 65,000-sq-ft facility to increase its operations sixfold. The move allowed the company to launch a pilot production facility and build an R&D center.

== Technology ==
The cellular agriculture technique used by Aleph Farms for their cultured meat is based on a process naturally occurring in cows to regrow and build muscle tissue.

The company isolates the cells responsible for this process and grows them in bioreactors, in the same conditions as inside the cow, to form muscle tissue typical to steaks. To mimic the natural environment and the 3D structure, cultivated meat companies, and Aleph Farms in particular, use a scaffold which is required to achieve the appropriate characteristics that allow cell adhesion and subsequent proliferation and tissue development. The extent to which the biology of the muscle is replicated, determines the complexity of the tissue engineering process that must be utilised. Like-for-like pieces of muscle (e.g. steak) require a system containing multiple cell types growing in an organised manner, on a structure that is similar to the extracellular matrix, composed mainly by collagen.

The company developed a technique that enables different cell types to grow together. In order to grow the meat without the need for raising livestock, a small amount of cells is extracted from an animal through a small sample and is placed afterward in a nutrient-rich broth. Within a cultivator designed to mimic the internal environment of the animal's body, the cells then multiply, differentiate, and form the same tissue as inside the animal's body. After the steak in the cultivator has grown to the desired size and characteristics, the steak is harvested and ready for cooking.

To produce thick vascularized tissues, Aleph Farms developed a technology based on 3D-Bioprinting. It involves the printing of actual living cells that are then incubated to grow, differentiate, and interact, in order to acquire the texture and qualities of a real steak. A proprietary system, similar to the vascularization that occurs naturally in tissues, enables the perfusion of nutrients across the thicker tissue and grants the steak with the similar shape and structure of its native form as found in livestock before and during cooking. This technology enables Aleph Farms to produce thicker and fattier steaks.

In March 2022, Aleph Farms announced that it was able to produce several types of collagen and the extracellular matrix directly from cow cells using a similar method as for steaks. The company claimed its cell-cultured collagen was superior to plant-based and fermentation-based products, and hoped to eventually produce animal products replacing the entire cow.

== Sustainability ==
A study published by CE Delft in January 2023 — the first ever to be based on data from cultivated meat companies — found that cultivated beef has the potential to reduce greenhouse gas emissions by 92%, land use by 95%, and water use by 78% compared to intensive livestock farming.

In April 2020, Aleph Farms became the first cultivated meat company to announce net zero carbon goals, which are to reach net zero carbon within its operations by 2025, and throughout its supply chain by 2030. In November 2021, it shared its strategy for achieving these goals along with key partnerships it has established to support its efforts.

The company signed a Memorandum of Understanding (MoU) with ENGIE Impact, the sustainability consulting arm of ENGIE, one of the world's leading energy providers. Engie will ensure that Aleph's operations are net zero compatible from the get-go, integrating energy efficiency, circularity in energy, as well as renewable energy and other strategic investments across its production line and supply chain.

In January 2022, Aleph Farms announced its partnership with Federation University Australia and Professor Harpinder Sandhu, an Ecological Economist with expertise in food and farming systems. The partnership focuses on examining the role of cultivated meat in a Just Transition of the livestock farming industry. Together, the entities will conduct a comparative study focused on the US, Europe and the Global South, examining different types of livestock systems (intensive and extensive) and exploring the impacts and potential benefits cultivated meat could bring to the table. Based on the findings, they will develop tailored business models that include synergies between cultivated meat and traditional livestock farming systems in each of these regions.

== Space program ==
In September 2019, Aleph Farms conducted the world's first experiment of meat cultivation aboard the International Space Station. It worked with 3D Bioprinting Solutions to produce a small-scale muscle tissue, the building block of its cultivated steak. The focus of this experiment was on establishing the cell-cell contacts, the structure, and the texture of a muscle tissue.

In October 2020, Aleph Farms announced the launch of its space program, Aleph Zero. The focus of the program is on developing a technological platform for the production of cultivated beef steaks in a process that consumes a significantly smaller portion of the resources needed to raise an entire animal for meat. Understanding these processes in such an extreme environment, will advance Aleph's ability to develop a complete process of cultivated meat production for long-term space missions and build an efficient production process that reduces the environmental footprint on Earth.

In April 2022, Aleph Farms carried out its second experiment in space as part of the Rakia Mission and Ax-1. Its experiment makes use of a special microfluidic device, developed by SpacePharma, that enables cow cells to grow and mature into cells that build muscle tissue, the cultivated steak, under microgravity conditions.
