= Mosa Meat =

Dutch food technology company

Mosa Meat B.V.
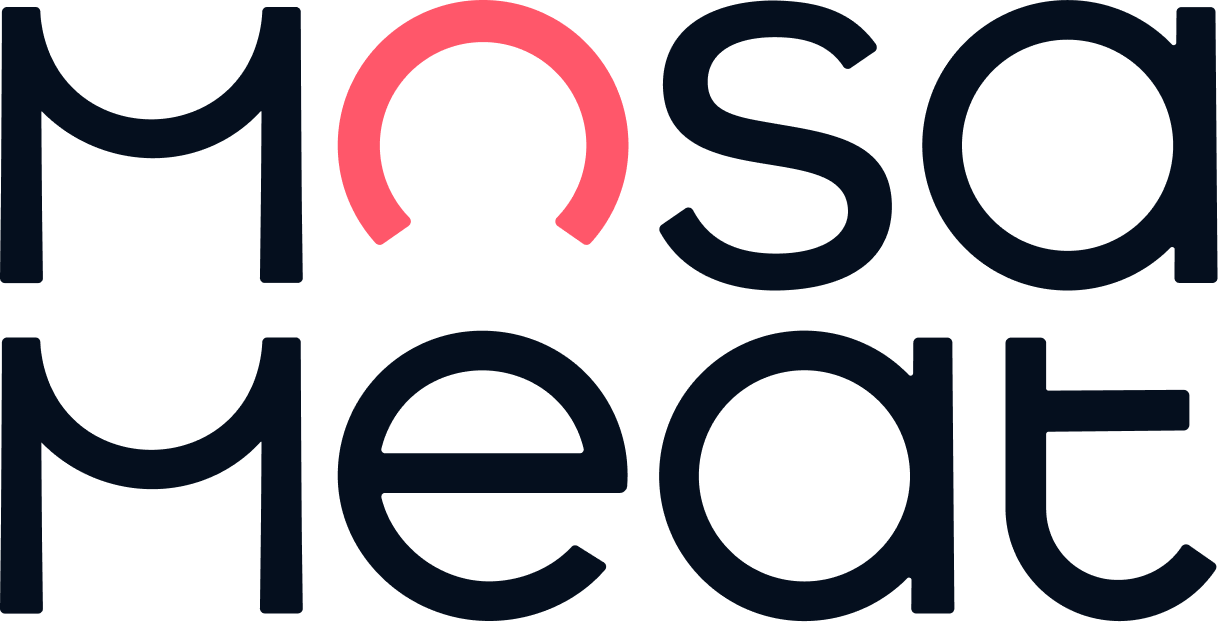
- Type: Privately held company (B.V.)
- Industry: Food technology
- Founded: May 2016
- Founders: Peter Verstrate, Mark Post
- Headquarters: Maastricht, The Netherlands
- Website: mosameat.com

Mosa Meat B.V. is a Dutch food technology company, headquartered in Maastricht, Netherlands, creating production methods for cultured meat. It was founded in May 2016.

== Organisation ==
Post lectures at the 2015 World Economic Forum on cultured meat.

Co-founder Mark Post is a professor of Sustainable Industrial Tissue Engineering at Maastricht University and serves as Chief Scientific Officer at Mosa Meat. Co-founder Peter Verstrate is a food technologist with a background in the processed meat industry, holding different positions at Sara Lee Corporation, Ahold, Smithfield Foods, Campofrío Food Group, Jack Links, and Hulshof Protein Technologies. He first served as CEO at Mosa Meat, and as of July 2019 is its chief operating officer, Maarten Bosch having succeeded him as CEO. Mosa Meat has several divisions including the Fat Team (led by Laura Jackisch), the Muscle Team, the (stem cell) Isolation Team and the Scale Team. The company had grown to about 120 employees (representing 23 nationalities) by February 2022 across science, engineering, operations and business roles.

== History ==
'We proved already in 2013 that we can make a hamburger. Now it's all about scaling up and getting the cost where it should be. That's exactly what this phase is all about.'

— Maarten Bosch, Mosa Meat (2020), Bloomberg

The team of scientists headed by Post and Verstrate developed the world's first cultured meat hamburger in 2013, which cost €250,000 (US$330,000) to produce and was funded by Google co-founder Sergey Brin. The production process took three laboratory technicians three months to grow the 20,000 individual muscle fibers that made up the burger.

In February 2017, the company set itself the goal to reduce the production costs to 60 euros per kilogram by 2020.

In July 2018, Mosa Meat announced that it had raised a €7.5 million Series A funding round. The round was led by M Ventures and Bell Food Group.

In February 2020, the startup estimated it could enter the market in 2022. In May 2020, Mosa Meat had begun installing its pilot plant in Maastricht. In 2020, Mosa Meat announced an 88 times cost reduction of their medium (the broth that feeds the cells) and in 2021, Mosa Meat announced a 65 times cost reduction of their fat medium, making animal fat that is 98% cheaper than their previous method.

In September 2020, the company obtained €45.4 million (55 million US dollars) from various investors, and in December 2020, it attracted another 16.5 million euros (20 million US dollars). Investors included Blue Horizon Ventures, the Bell Food Group, and Mitsubishi. Mosa Meat said it would spend the money on expanding its pilot plant in Maastricht and hiring more personnel. In January 2021, Mosa Meat indicated it would initiate the regulatory approval procedure for its product with the European Food Safety Agency (EFSA) during that year.

In February 2021, Mosa Meat closed its Series B funding round at $85 million. The round included Jitse Groen from Just Eat Takeaway.

By March 2021, Mosa Meat had secured over 70 million euros in funding from various investors including Nutreco and Just Eat Takeaway CEO Jitse Groen. In September 2021, actor and environmentalist Leonardo DiCaprio announced that he had funded Mosa Meat and Aleph Farms for undisclosed amounts of money, stating: 'One of the most impactful ways to combat the climate crisis is to transform our food system. Mosa Meat and Aleph Farms offer new ways to satisfy the world's demand for beef, while solving some of the most pressing issues of current industrial beef production.'

In September 2021 Leonardo DiCaprio joined Mosa Meat as an investor and an advisor.

One month later in October 2021, the European Union invested €2 million towards developing cultured beef for commercial markets.

Originally, the start-up worked with a 100-millilitre tank. By November 2021, Mosa was producing a few kilograms of meat a month (in 40-litre tanks) in order to prepare for submitting an application for the EFSA's regulatory approval within the next six months. In the near future, they sought to produce 100 kilograms per month (or 1,200 kilograms year) per 200-litre bioreactors. The last step would be 10,000-litre tanks, which would be scalable to 180,000 kilograms a year.

In January 2022, Mosa Meat published a peer-reviewed paper on how to achieve muscle differentiation in cultured meat without the use of fetal bovine serum (FBS) and without genetically modifying the cells. In May 2023, the new production hall at the Randwyck-Zuid business park in Maastricht was opened by Limburg's governor Emile Roemer and Maastricht's mayor Annemarie Penn-te Strake; top chef Hans van Wolde was presented as a member of the development team. The new production facility reportedly had a capacity of several tens of thousands of cultured meat burgers per year, scalable to hundreds of thousands. Production time had been reduced to 4–6 weeks: muscle cells matured within a week, while fat cells took longer.

In January 2025, a consortium of parties including NIZO food research and Mosa Meat announced to build two new pilot plants to develop cultured meat, with financial support from the Ministry of Agriculture, Fisheries, Food Security and Nature, the Perspective Fund Gelderland and the National Growth Fund. NIZO would set up a new Biotechnology Fermentation Factory (BFF) at its campus in Ede, which would focus on scaling up precision fermentation of animal proteins, in order to make cheese or milk without using cattle.

== Product ==
Mosa Meat is focused on making ground beef products. The meat-making process begins by taking peppercorn-size samples of cells from Limousin cows. The cells are then isolated into muscle or fat and fed on a nutrient-dense growth medium, eventually resembling ground hamburger meat with the exact same genetic code as the cows. In May 2021, Mosa Meat hosted a tasting of its cultivated fat. Co-founder Peter Verstrate described Mosa fat as having an "overwhelming animal signature" even more potent than conventional fat.
