= NIZO food research =

Dutch food research company

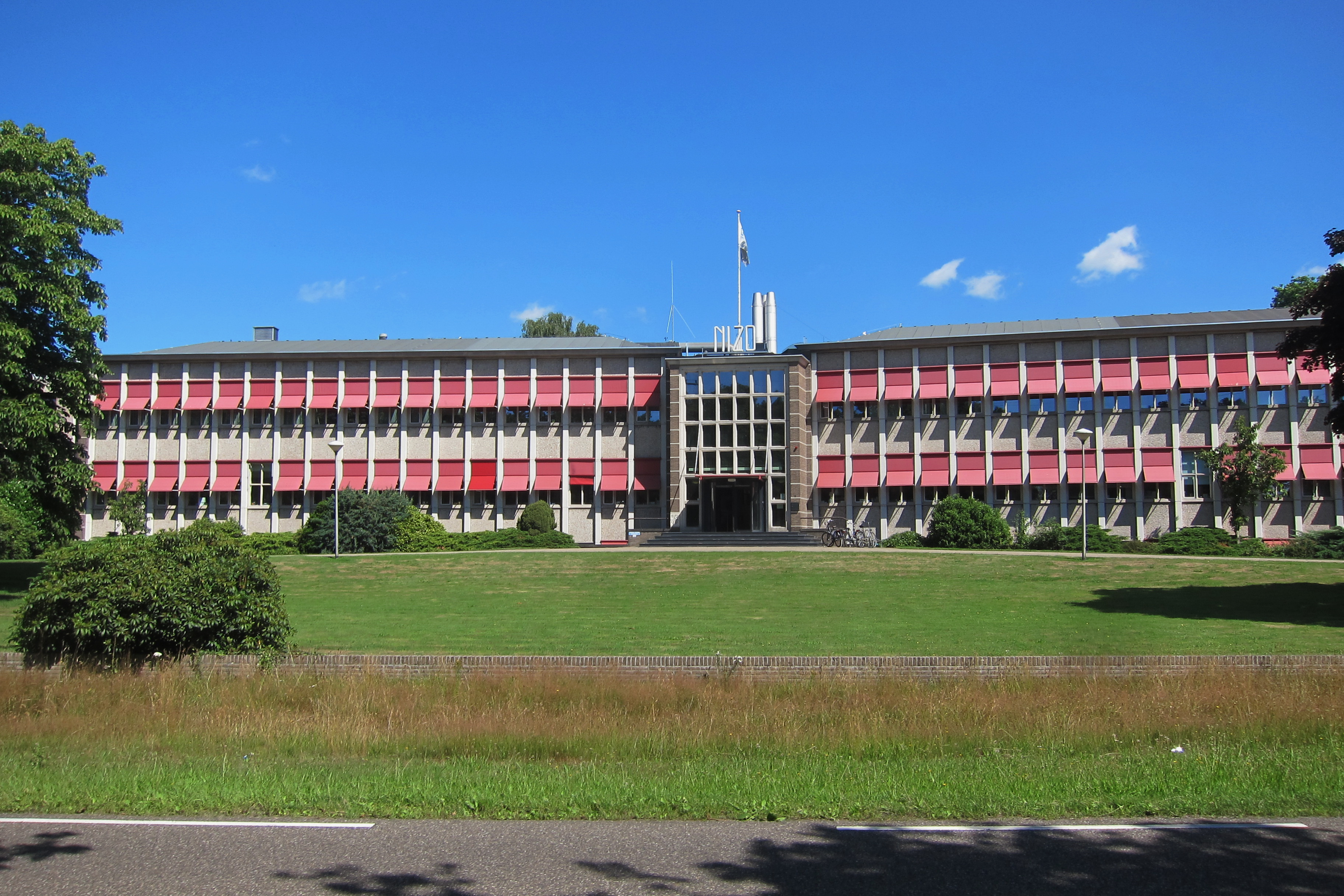
- NIZO food research main building in Ede
- Company type: Privately held company (B.V.)
- Industry: Food technology
- Predecessor: Stichting Nederlands Instituut voor Zuivelonderzoek (NIZO), 1948–2003
- Founded: 2003
- Founders: Dutch dairy cooperatives
- Headquarters: Ede, the Netherlands
- Owner: Gilde Healthcare
- Website: nizo.com

NIZO food research, previously Nederlands Instituut voor Zuivelonderzoek (NIZO, "Dutch Institute for Dairy Research"), is a testing institute for food and beverage products in Ede, Netherlands. It strives for innovation in food and health products. The institute began as a non-profit foundation in 1948. In the years 2003–2009, it was gradually transformed into an independent commercial company.

== History ==
=== Stichting Nederlands Instituut voor Zuivelonderzoek (1948–2003) ===
1955: Agriculture Minister Mansholt opening the NIZO lab in Ede.

In the late 1940s, there were many, usually small-scale dairy cooperatives in the Netherlands which had no research and development (R&D) facilities. An agreement was reached to jointly found an institute to host such capabilities for all cooperatives to use. The Nederlands Instituut voor Zuivelonderzoek (NIZO, "Dutch Institute for Dairy Research") was therefore established by the Dutch dairy cooperatives as a non-profit foundation in 1948.

The institute was initially located in Hoorn in the province of North Holland. In 1953, it was decided to move to Ede in the province of Gelderland, where a laboratory was founded on part of the Kernhem estate. This new lab was housed in a modern building formally opened on 2 June 1955 by the Minister of Agriculture, Sicco Mansholt. At the time, newspaper NRC Handelsblad quoted the Minister as saying: "The institute [shall] have to serve the community in two ways. Through research on the one hand, but also by seeking new outlets on the other."

The name "NIZO food research" has been in use since at least 1963, initially only in English-language publications, but from around the 1990s also in Dutch-language texts.

=== Company NIZO food research (2003–present) ===
In 2003, the NIZO foundation became a company. The increase in scale of the Dutch dairy companies, due to repeated mergers, also changed the position of the institute. Moreover, since the late 1980s, companies started doing more and more product development themselves and setting up their own research departments.

After the merger of Friesland Foods and Campina in 2007, this FrieslandCampina merger company held 80% of NIZO's shares. Consequently, there was no future for the institute as owned by the "joint" Dutch dairy companies. In 2009, the institute was made independent by a management buyout. Gilde Healthcare became a shareholder in 2016. NIZO food research has grown into a commercial research organisation carrying out assignments for the food industry.

In January 2025, a consortium of parties including NIZO food research and Mosa Meat announced to build two new pilot plants to develop cultured meat, with financial support from the Ministry of Agriculture, Fisheries, Food Security and Nature, the Perspective Fund Gelderland and the National Growth Fund. NIZO would set up a new Biotechnology Fermentation Factory (BFF) at its campus in Ede, which would focus on scaling up precision fermentation of animal proteins, in order to make cheese or milk without using cattle.

== Business ==
NIZO is a private and independent player with its headquarters in Ede and other offices in France, the United States and Japan. It employs about 100 scientists and support staff. The company conducts research into the quality of food products and ingredients and is an expert in proteins, bacteria and processing.

== Bibliography ==
- van der Meer, Tom (2011). "Ad Juriaanse: 'Nizo is ontmoetingsplaats'" [Ad Juriaanse: 'Nizo is a meeting place']. Eisma Voedingsmiddelenindustrie: Magazine voor Management in de Voedingsmiddelenindustrie (3): 13–15.
