= Food trends =

Widespread changes in food preferences

Food trends are the changes and shifts in consumer preferences, behaviors, and consumption patterns related to food and beverages. These trends can encompass a wide range of factors, including ingredients, flavors, cooking techniques, dining habits, and nutritional considerations. Some such trends prove to be long-lasting. Food trends are often discussed in magazines devoted to cuisine and on the internet.

Food trends have a profound impact on the culinary industry, transforming the way restaurants, cafés, and food businesses operate. Culinary experts, including visionary chefs and food entrepreneurs, play a pivotal role in driving and responding to these trends. They bring their creativity to the forefront, pushing boundaries and redefining culinary norms.

The influence of food trends extends beyond the boundaries of individual establishments. Entire food markets are shaped by the demand for specific trends, giving rise to specialty stores that cater to niche preferences. Food festivals and events showcase the latest culinary innovations, acting as platforms for food enthusiasts and professionals to connect and explore exciting flavors together.

== Duration ==
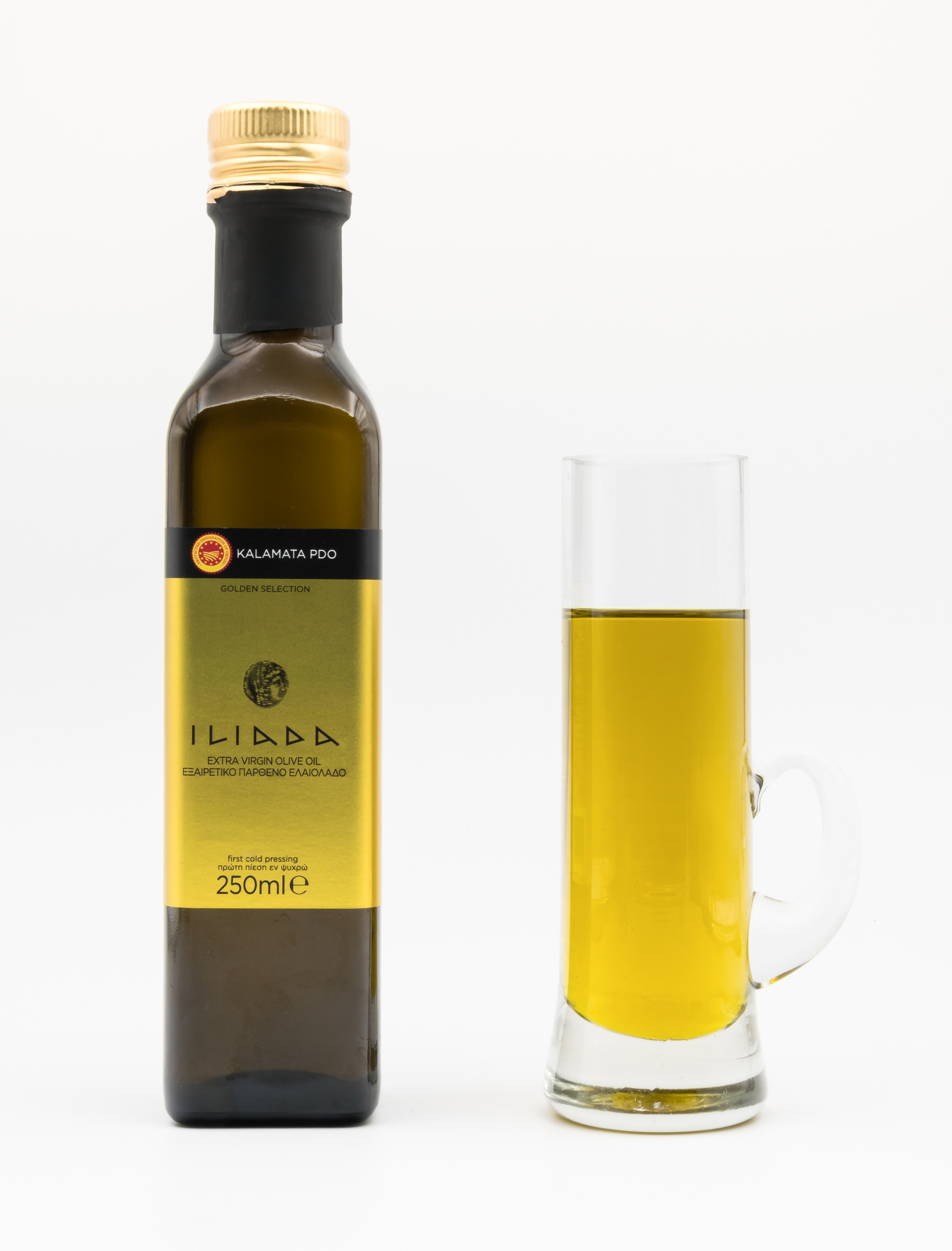
A bottle of extra virgin olive oil

Although certain food trends may be more of a fad (such as a fad diet), some become long-lasting and, at times, a permanent fixture in the culture of food. In an article in Bon Appétit the difference between a food trend versus a fad is discussed.

Canadian journalist David Sax states, "Think about extra virgin olive oil—with the gourmands it hit big in the late '70s, early '80s, and it trickled down to everyone else in the '90s. It became the 'thing.' Now it's not a trend, nobody really talks about it. But it's the default oil. Food trends last a long time and are often good."

== Negative Effects ==
When a popular food trend arises and it seems to be beneficial on the surface level, many people may neglect the unforeseen negatives. It is true that, in reality, many recent trends come with food-safety challenges.

Sustainability-driven trends like zero-waste and backyard production often conflict with best sanitary practices. The popular at home-fermentation is another that raises concerns. Its popularity has increased due to perceived health benefits and pandemic-era behavior changes. Improper fermentation can lead to foodborne illness, especially in unregulated or artisanal settings. With plastic-reduction being a worldwide effort, reusable bags have become widely used. These, along with informal reuse of food containers can harbor pathogens if not cleaned properly.

== Discussions of trends ==
Austrian researcher Hanni Rützler speaks about food trends.

Authorities from Bon Appétit and Food & Wine magazines to the top chefs of the world have driven and reported on these trends. For instance, Bon Appétit recently released their top 25 food trends for 2013 in their article "The BA 25: What to eat, drink, and cook in 2013",

Pinterest and Twitter give links to sites listing what to serve this season. Pinterest is designed to display trends, and food is one of its biggest categories.
