= Finless Foods =

American food technology company

- Type: Privately held company
- Industry: Food technology
- Founded: March 2017
- Founders: Michael Selden and Brian Wyrwas
- Headquarters: Emeryville, California, United States
- Key people: Brandon Chen (CEO)
- Website: finlessfoods.com

Finless Foods, or Finless for short, is an American biotechnology company aimed at cultured fish, particularly bluefin tuna.

== History ==
=== Origins ===
Finless Foods was founded in June 2016 and is headquartered in Emeryville, California. At the time, co-founders Mike Selden (CEO) and Brian Wyrwas (CIO) were both molecular biologists (biochemists) in their mid-20s who met each other at the University of Massachusetts Amherst. They decided to focus on cultivating bluefin tuna because this species is under threat, and as an expensive food product it is easier to achieve price parity with this fish species. Wyrwas stated in an interview: 'For me, this stems from making something out of nothing and creating an abundance. This is going to be no mercury, no microplastics, more sustainable seafood. In a sense this will be the most pure sample of protein of muscle that you could ever get.'

=== Proof of concept ===
In March 2017 the company commenced laboratory operations. CEO Mike Selden said in July 2017 to expect cultured fish products on the market by the end of 2019. He found the term "lab-grown meat" to be inaccurate for the end product Finless was aiming for, comparing cultivating fish with brewing beer. Product development of beer also starts from laboratories, but nobody calls the end product "lab-grown" anymore either: 'So if we're lab-grown meat, then beer is lab-grown beer. We're not going to have armies of scientists sitting over petri dishes forever.'

Finless Foods presented its proof of concept, fish croquettes, in September 2017. Guardian journalist Amy Fleming, who attended the tasting, wrote: "I find it both delicious and disappointing. It’s only 25% fish and the subtle carp flavour is eclipsed by the potato. I just about detect a pleasant aftertaste of the sea, though not fish as such. But then, far from a polished product from a development kitchen, this is a first prototype – a benchmark of scientific progress."

By September 2017, production costs were about $19,000 per pound of fish, not including labour. By February 2018, the company claimed to have been able to reduce production costs to $7,000 per pound. The same year, Selden reported having received $3.5 million in venture capital.

=== Seeking regulatory approval ===
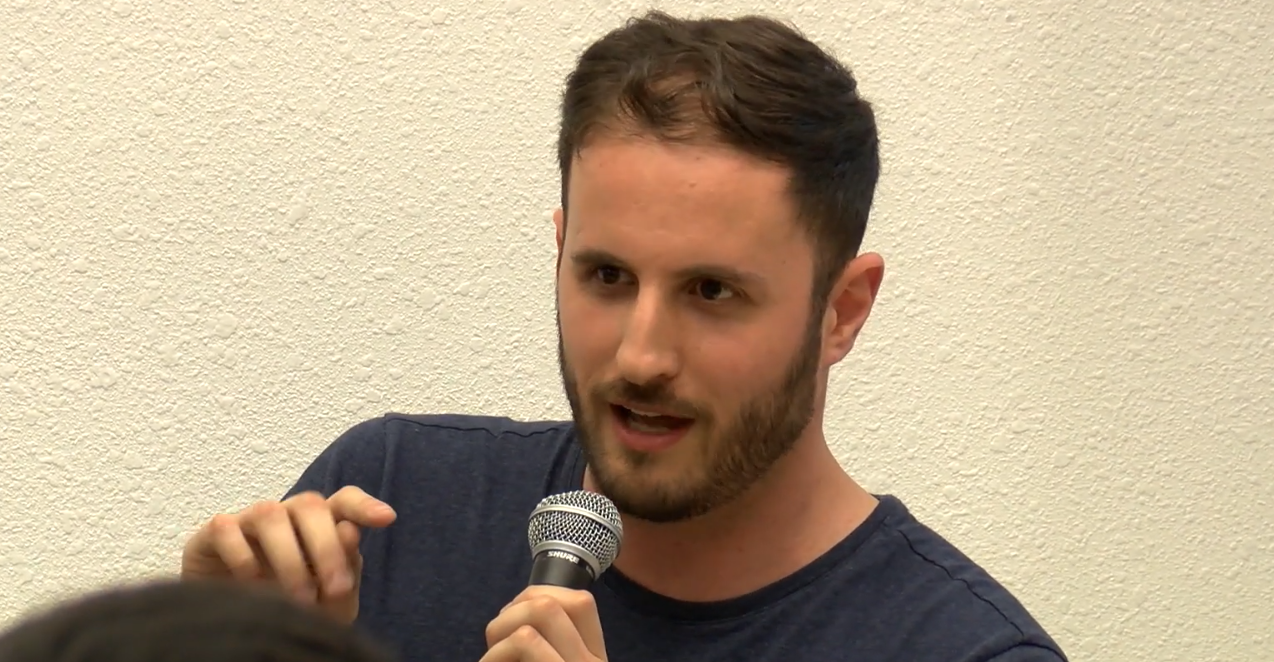
CEO Mike Selden in April 2019

In August 2019, five startups – Eat Just, Memphis Meats, Finless Foods, BlueNalu, and Fork & Goode – announced the formation of the Alliance for Meat, Poultry & Seafood Innovation (AMPS Innovation), a coalition seeking to work with regulators to create a pathway to market for cultured meat and seafood.

In October 2021, Selden stated that he thought Finless might obtain regulatory approval from the FDA to sell its products within months, perhaps before the end of 2021. FDA officials were said to be very helpful in explaining regulations and giving advice on how to build and operate safe and efficient production facilities, which Finless promptly implemented during the construction of its pilot plant.

=== Products launched ===
In May 2022, Finless Foods launched a plant-based "tuna analogue" product, made from nine plant-based ingredients, at the National Restaurant Association's Show, with national availability. One of the company's plant-based tuna options is created using winter melon as the main ingredient.

== Sources ==
- Barreira, Alex (14 October 2021). "The cell-cultivated meat revolution is starting, and these Bay Area startups are ready". San Francisco Business Times.
- Broad, G. M. (2020). "Making Meat, Better: The Metaphors of Plant-Based and Cell-Based Meat Innovation". Environmental Communication. 14 (7). Routledge: 919–932. Bibcode:2020Ecomm..14..919B. doi:10.1080/17524032.2020.1725085.
- Card, Jon (24 July 2017). "Lab-grown food: 'the goal is to remove the animal from meat production'". The Guardian.
- Carman, Tim (13 November 2018). "Can we save the prized bluefin tuna, and its habitat, by growing it in a lab?". The Washington Post.
- Fleming, Amy (20 September 2017). "Could lab-grown fish and meat feed the world – without killing a single animal?". The Guardian.
- Mellon, Jim (2020). Moo's Law: An Investor's Guide to the New Agrarian Revolution. Harriman House Limited. pp. 144–145. ISBN 9780993047879.
- Watson, Elaine (11 February 2020). "Cell-based meat in focus: In conversation with Meatable, Finless Foods, New Age Meats". Food Navigator.
- Wiley, Frieda (2019). "Will Your Burger Soon Be Grown in the Lab?". BioScience. 69 (11): 948. doi:10.1093/biosci/biz096.
