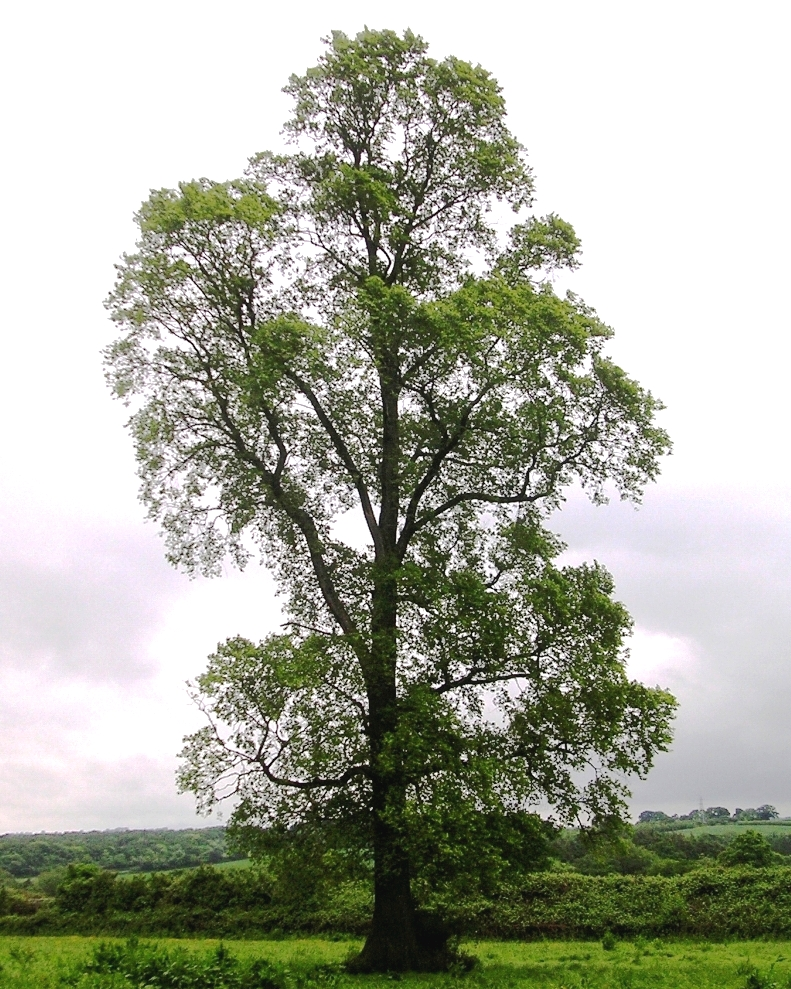
- U. minor, East Coker

Scientific classification
- Kingdom: Plantae
- Clade: Tracheophytes
- Clade: Angiosperms
- Clade: Eudicots
- Clade: Rosids
- Order: Rosales
- Family: Ulmaceae
- Genus: Ulmus; L.

Species
- See: List of elm species; List of elm cultivars, hybrids and hybrid cultivars; List of elm synonyms and accepted names

= Elm =

Elm Temporal range: Maastrichtian - Recent

Flowering, deciduous trees, family Ulmaceae

Elms are deciduous and semi-deciduous trees comprising the genus Ulmus in the family Ulmaceae. They are distributed over most of the Northern Hemisphere, inhabiting the temperate and tropical-montane regions of North America and Eurasia, ranging southward in Western Asia to Iran, in Africa to Libya, and in Southeast Asia into Indonesia.

Elms are components of many kinds of natural forests. Moreover, during the 19th and early 20th centuries, many species and cultivars were also planted as ornamental street, garden, and park trees in Europe, North America, and parts of the Southern Hemisphere, notably Australasia. Some individual elms reached great size and age. However, in recent decades, most mature elms of European or North American origin have died from Dutch elm disease, caused by a microfungus dispersed by bark beetles. In response, disease-resistant cultivars have been developed, capable of restoring the elm to forestry and landscaping.

== Description ==
The genus is hermaphroditic, having apetalous perfect flowers which are wind-pollinated. Elm leaves are alternate, with simple, single- or, most commonly, doubly serrate margins, usually asymmetric at the base and acuminate at the apex. The fruit is a round wind-dispersed samara flushed with chlorophyll, facilitating photosynthesis before the leaves emerge. The samarae are very light, those of British elms numbering around 50,000 to the pound (454 g). (Very rarely anomalous samarae occur with more than two wings.) All species are tolerant of a wide range of soils and pH levels but, with few exceptions, demand good drainage. The elm tree can grow to great height, the American elm in excess of 30 metres (98 feet), often with a forked trunk creating a vase profile.

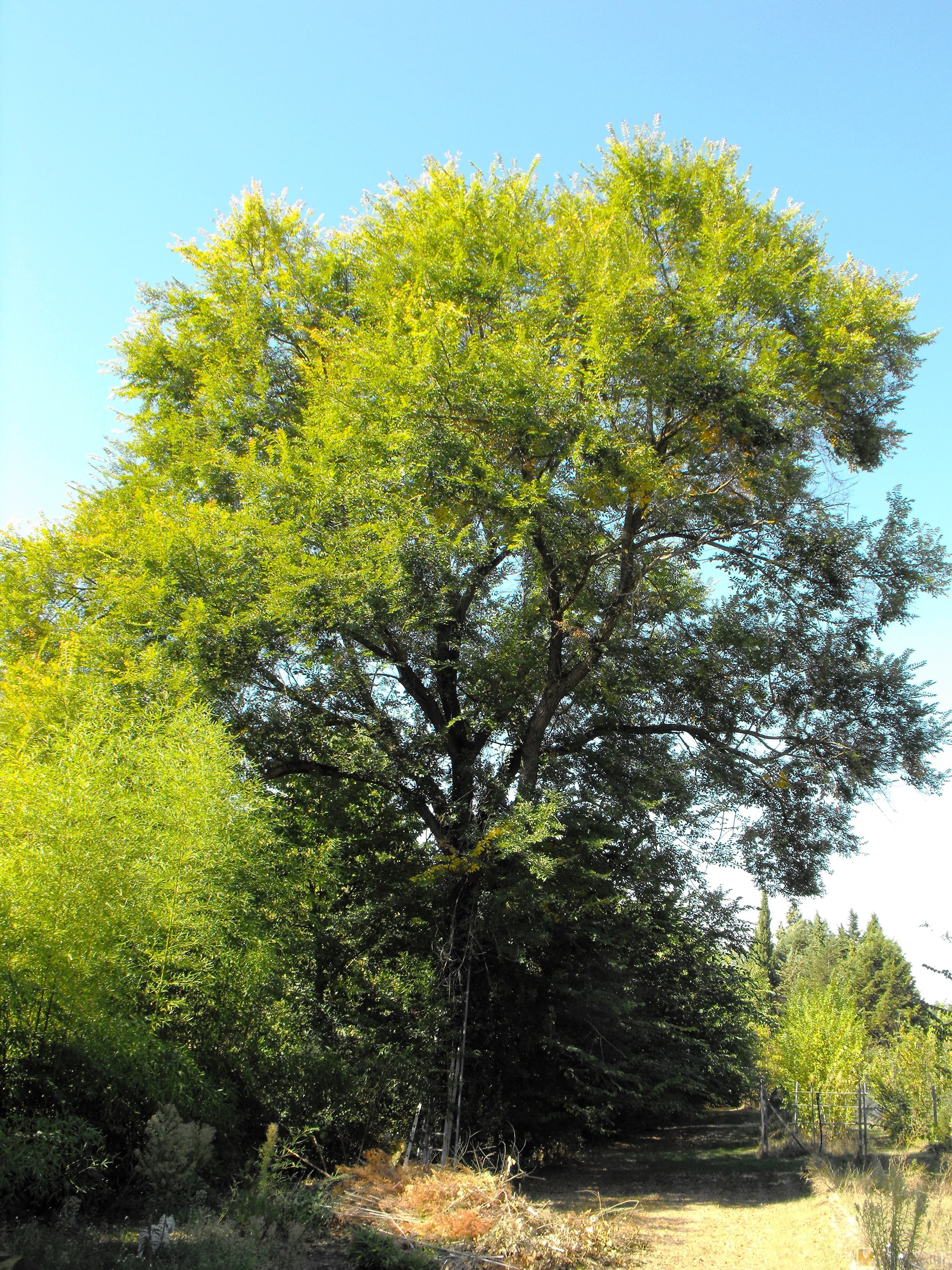
'Sapporo Autumn Gold', Antella, Florence

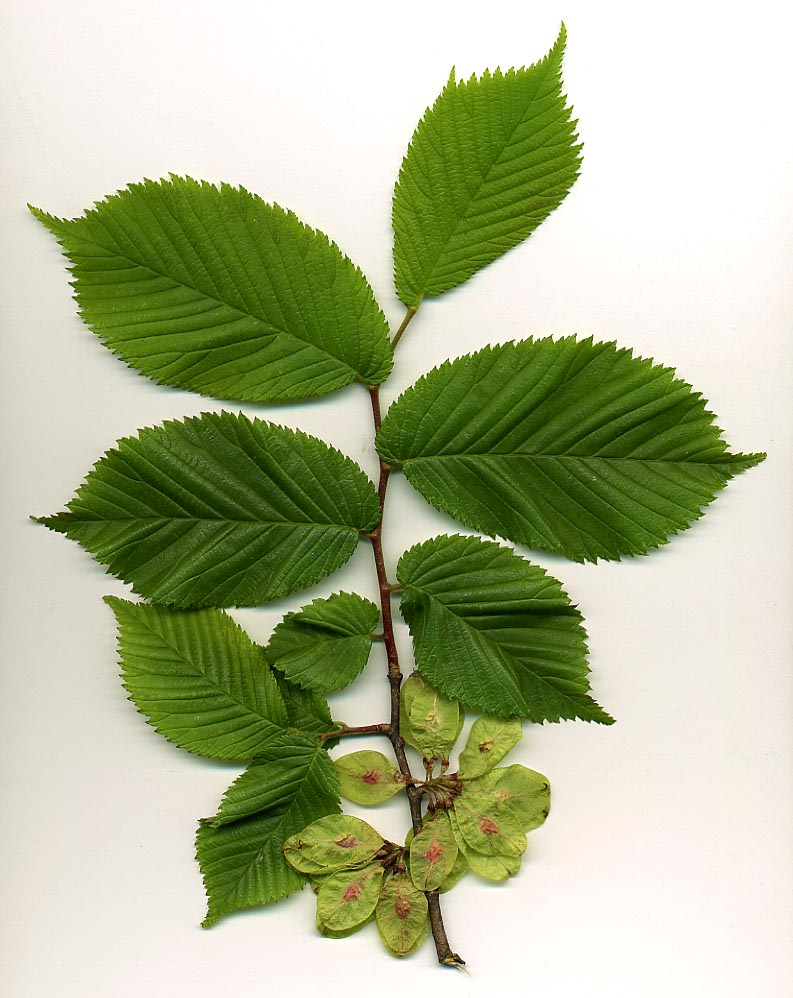
Wych elm (Ulmus glabra) leaves and seeds

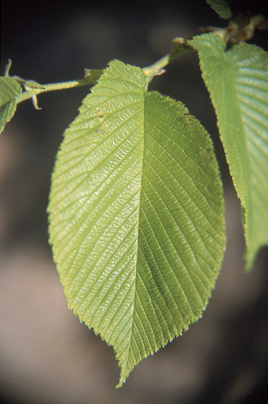
Asymmetry of leaf, slippery elm U. rubra

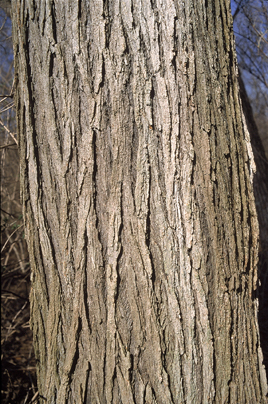
Mature bark, slippery elm U. rubra

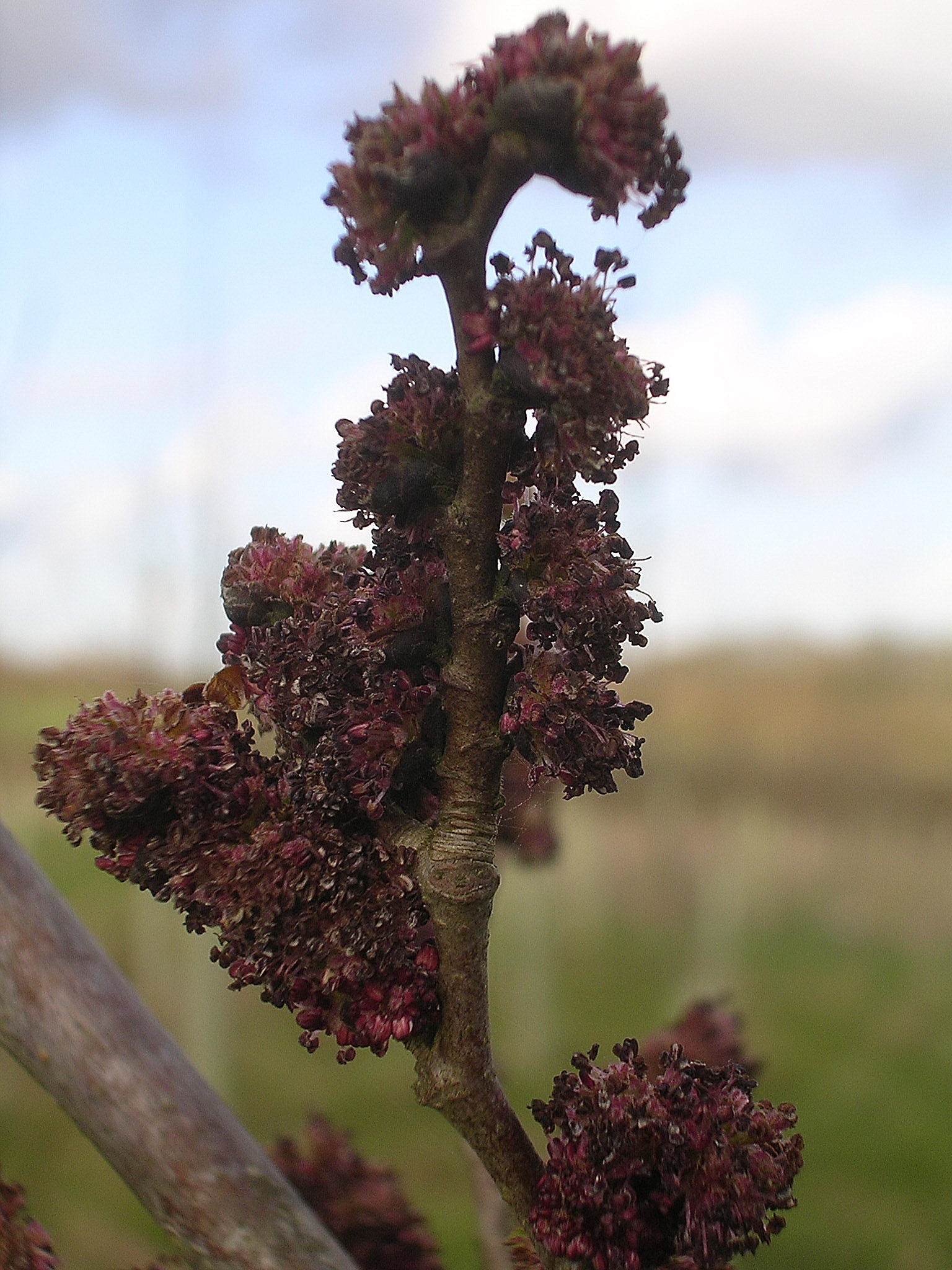
Flowers of the hybrid elm cultivar 'Columella'

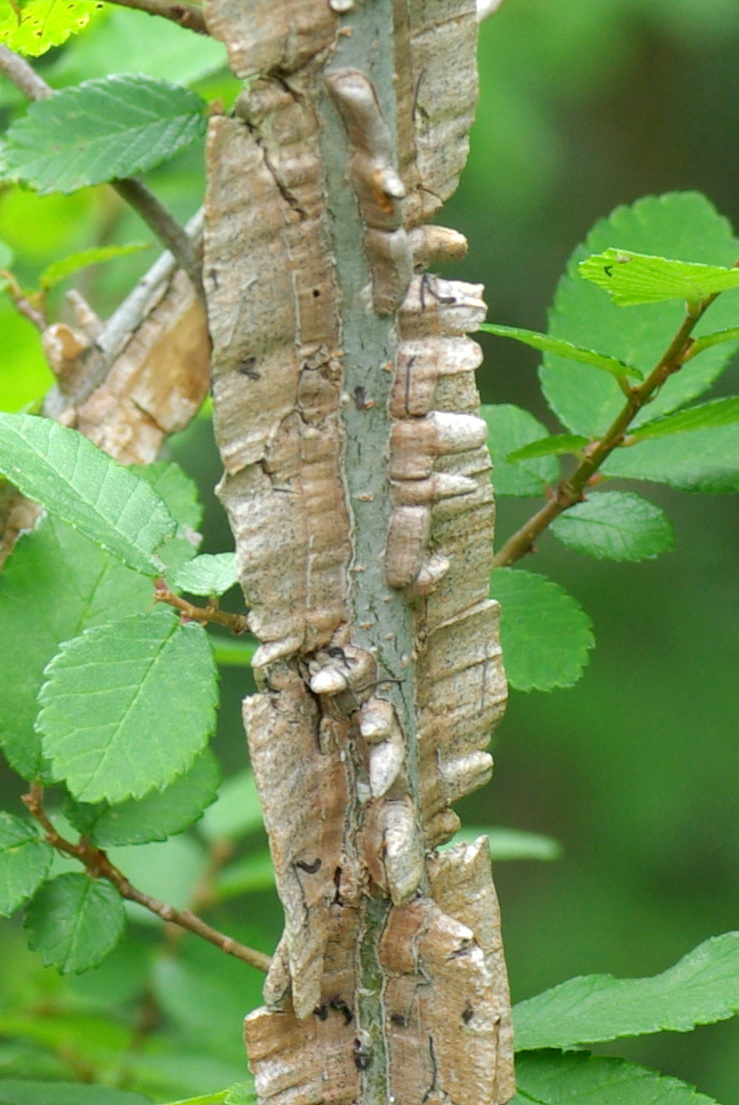
Corky wings, Cedar elm, U. crassifolia

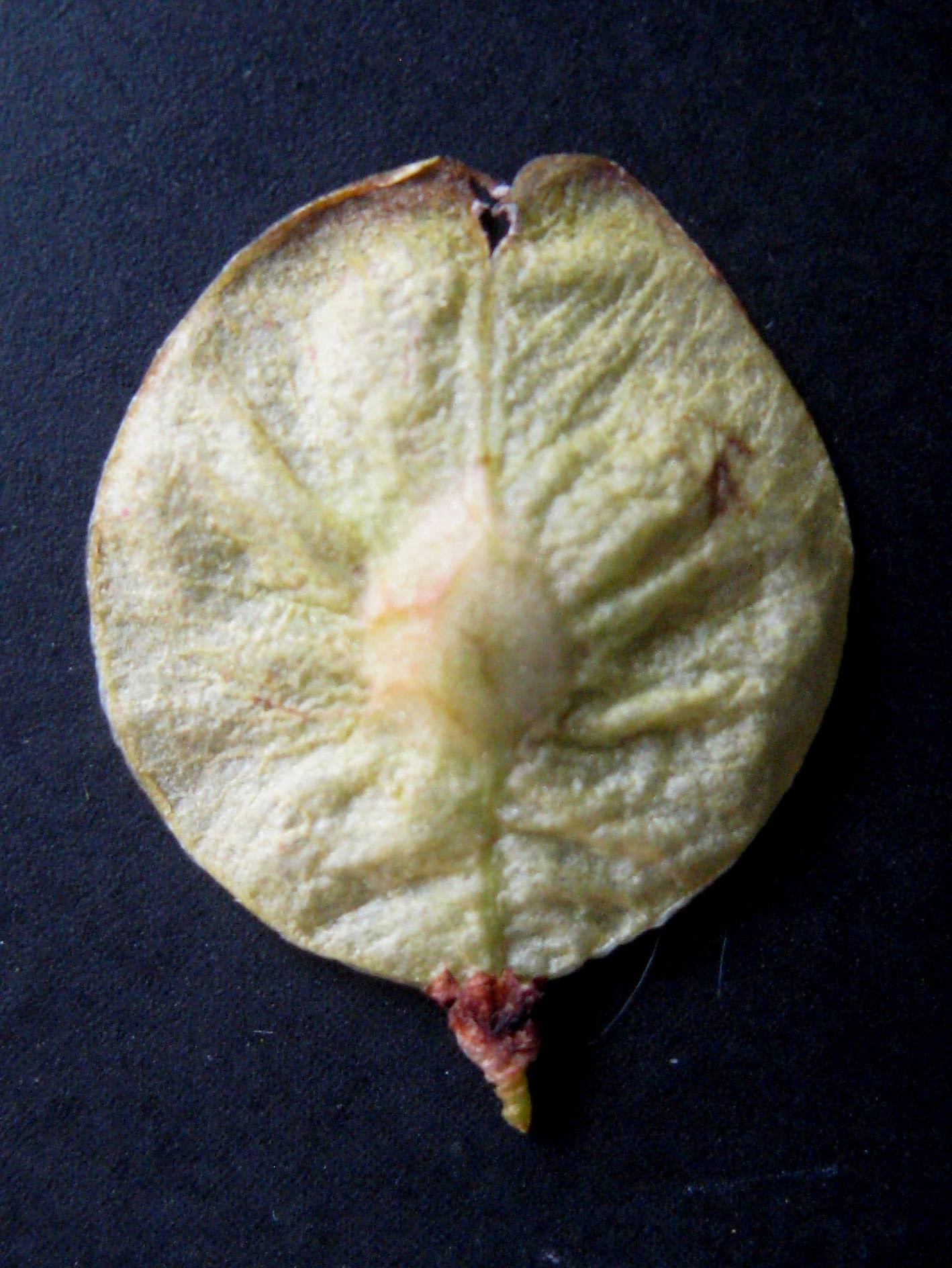
U. laciniata samara

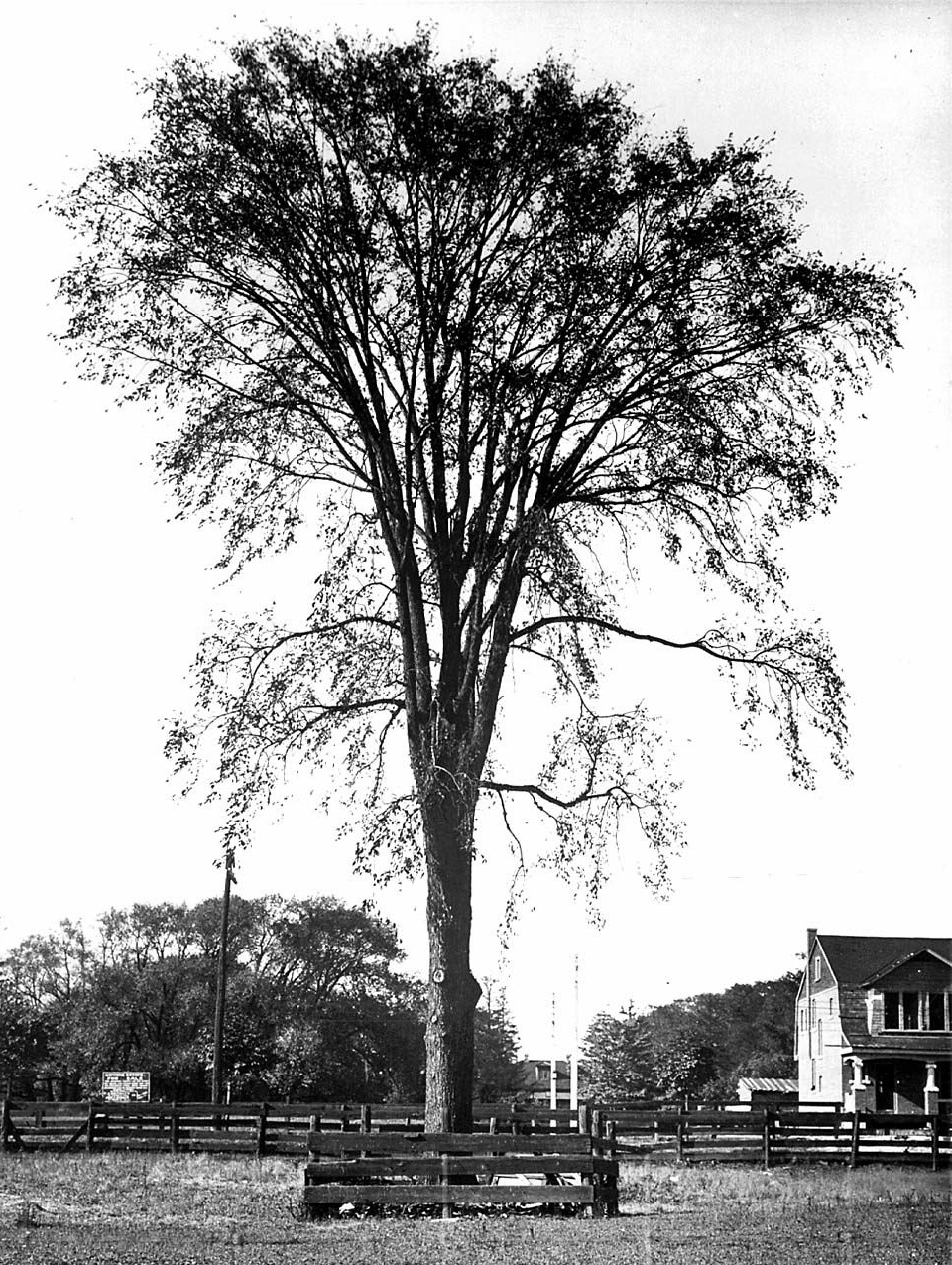
U. americana, Dufferin St., Toronto, c. 1914

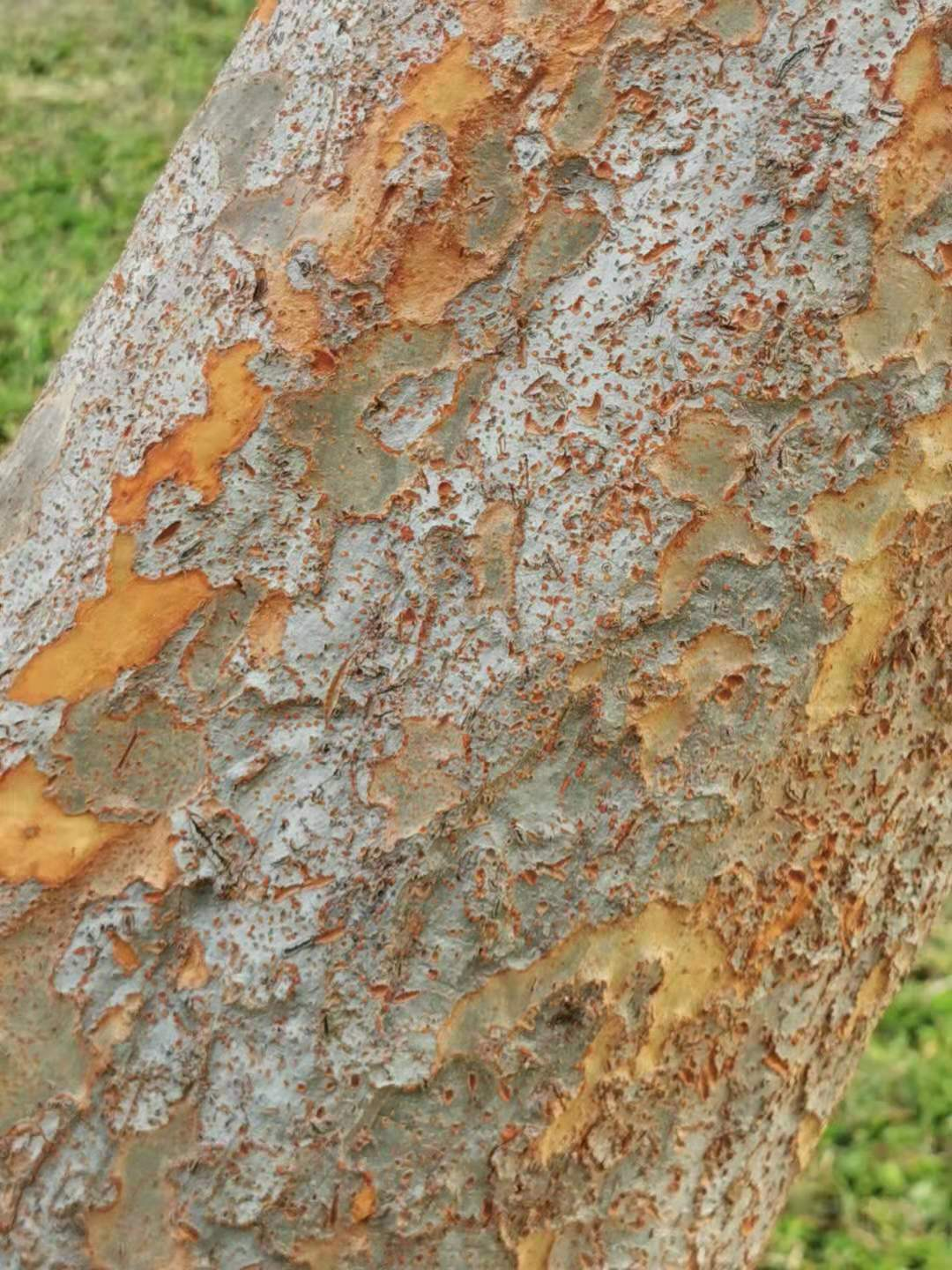
Ulmus parvifolia bark

== Taxonomy ==
There are about 30 to 40 species of Ulmus; the ambiguity in number results from difficulty in delineating species, owing to the ease of hybridization between them and the development of local seed-sterile vegetatively propagated microspecies in some areas, mainly in the field elm (Ulmus minor) group. Oliver Rackham describes Ulmus as the most critical genus in the entire British flora, adding that 'species and varieties are a distinction in the human mind rather than a measured degree of genetic variation'. Eight species are endemic to North America and three to Europe, but the greatest diversity is in Asia with approximately two dozen species. The oldest fossils of Ulmus are leaves dating Paleocene, found across the Northern Hemisphere.

The classification adopted in the List of elm species is largely based on that established by Brummitt. A large number of synonyms have accumulated over the last three centuries; their currently accepted names can be found in the list of Elm synonyms and accepted names.

Botanists who study elms and argue over elm identification and classification are called "pteleologists", from the Greek πτελέα (elm).

As part of the urticalean rosid clade, formerly order Urticales, they are distantly related to cannabis, mulberries, figs, hops, and nettles.

== Ecology ==
=== Propagation ===
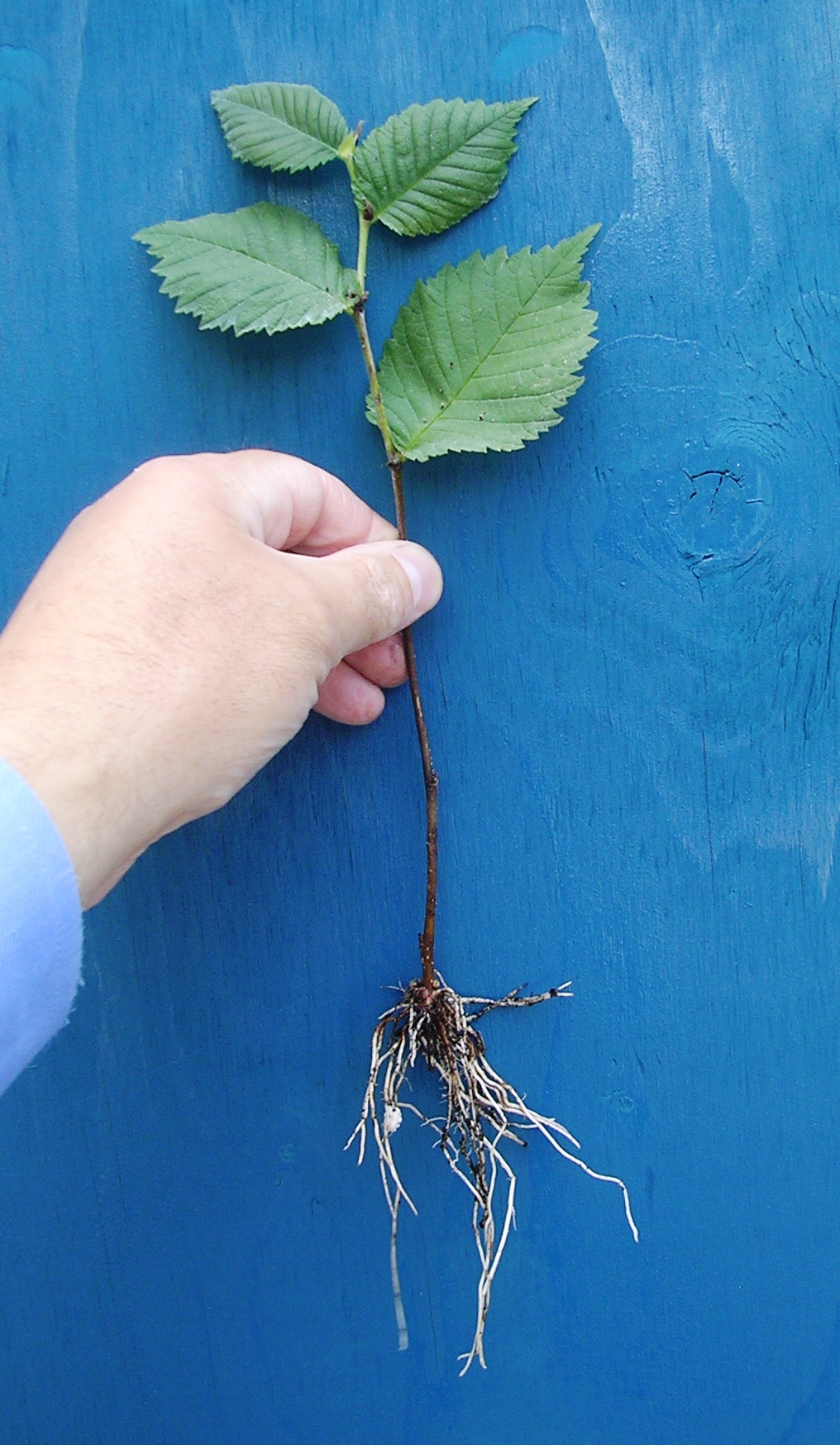
A rooted cutting of European white elm (July)

Elm propagation methods vary according to elm type and location, and the plantsman's needs. Native species may be propagated by seed. In their natural setting, native species, such as wych elm and European white elm in central and northern Europe and field elm in southern Europe, set viable seed in "favourable" seasons. Optimal conditions occur after a late warm spring. After pollination, seeds of spring-flowering elms ripen and fall at the start of summer (June); they remain viable for only a few days. They are planted in sandy potting soil at a depth of 1 cm, and germinate in three weeks. Slow-germinating American elm will remain dormant until the second season. Seeds from autumn-flowering elms ripen in the fall and germinate in the spring. Since elms may hybridize within and between species, seed propagation entails a hybridisation risk. In unfavourable seasons, elm seeds are usually sterile. Elms outside their natural range, such as English elm U. minor 'Atinia', and elms unable to pollinate because pollen sources are genetically identical, are sterile and are propagated by vegetative reproduction. Vegetative reproduction is also used to produce genetically identical elms (clones). Methods include the winter transplanting of root suckers; taking hardwood cuttings from vigorous one-year-old shoots in late winter, taking root cuttings in early spring; taking softwood cuttings in early summer; grafting; ground and air layering; and micropropagation. A bottom heat of 18 °C and humid conditions are maintained for hard- and softwood cuttings. The transplanting of root suckers remains the easiest and most common propagation method for European field elm and its hybrids. For specimen urban elms, grafting to wych-elm rootstock may be used to eliminate suckering or to ensure stronger root growth. The mutant-elm cultivars are usually grafted, the "weeping" elms 'Camperdown' and 'Horizontalis' at 2–3 m (7–10 ft), the dwarf cultivars 'Nana' and 'Jacqueline Hillier' at ground level. Since the Siberian elm is drought tolerant, in dry countries, new varieties of elm are often root-grafted onto this species.

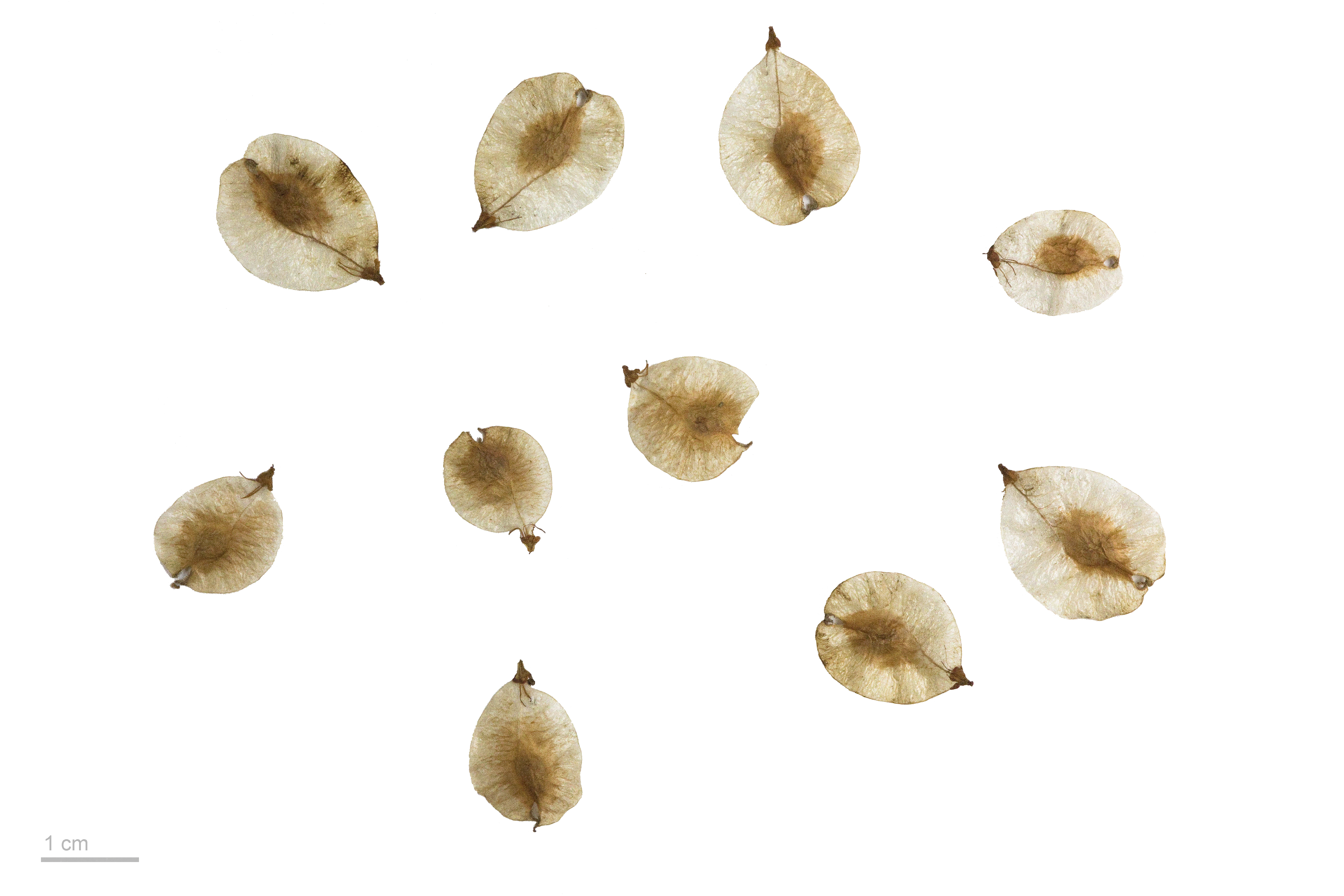
Ripe samarae of field elm

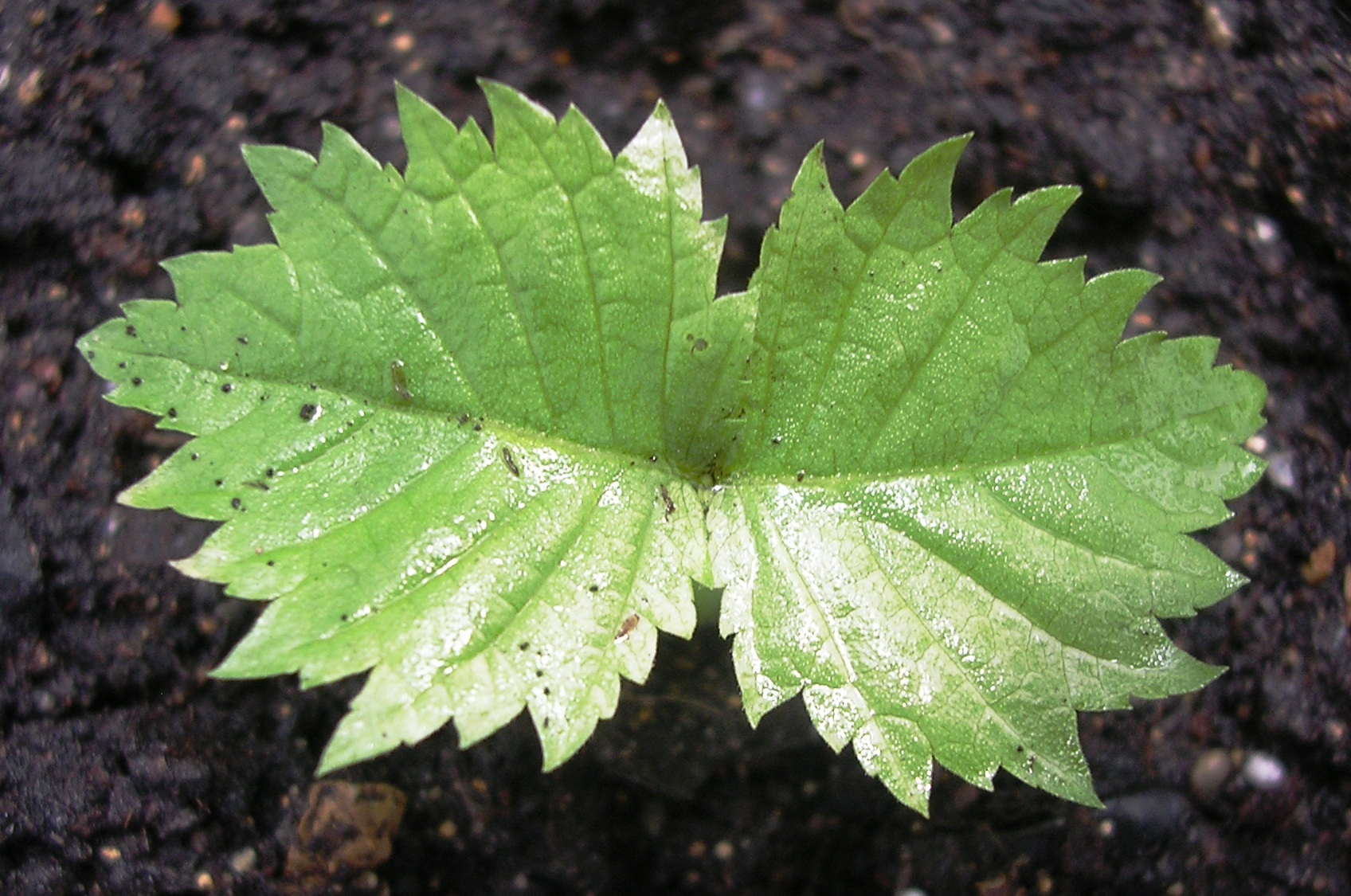
Rock elm Ulmus thomasii germinating

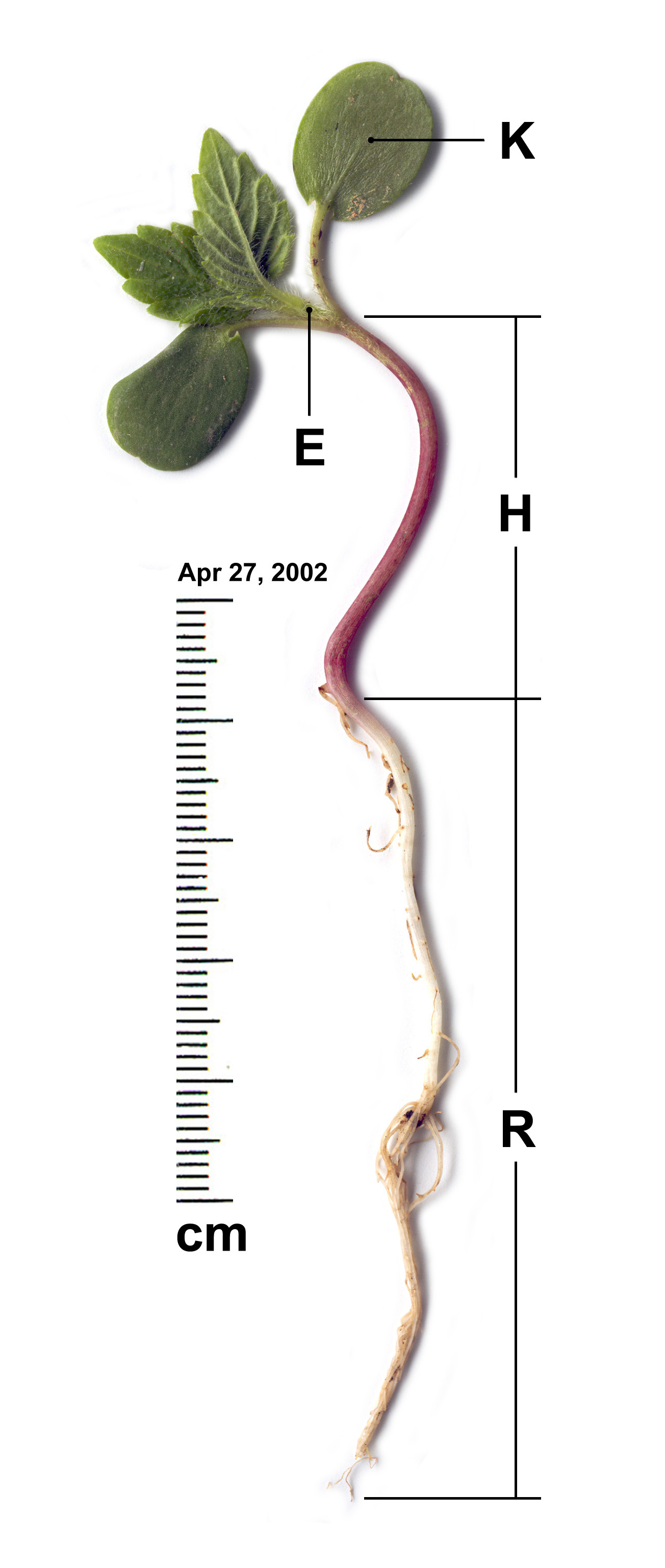
Seedling of wych elm U. glabra

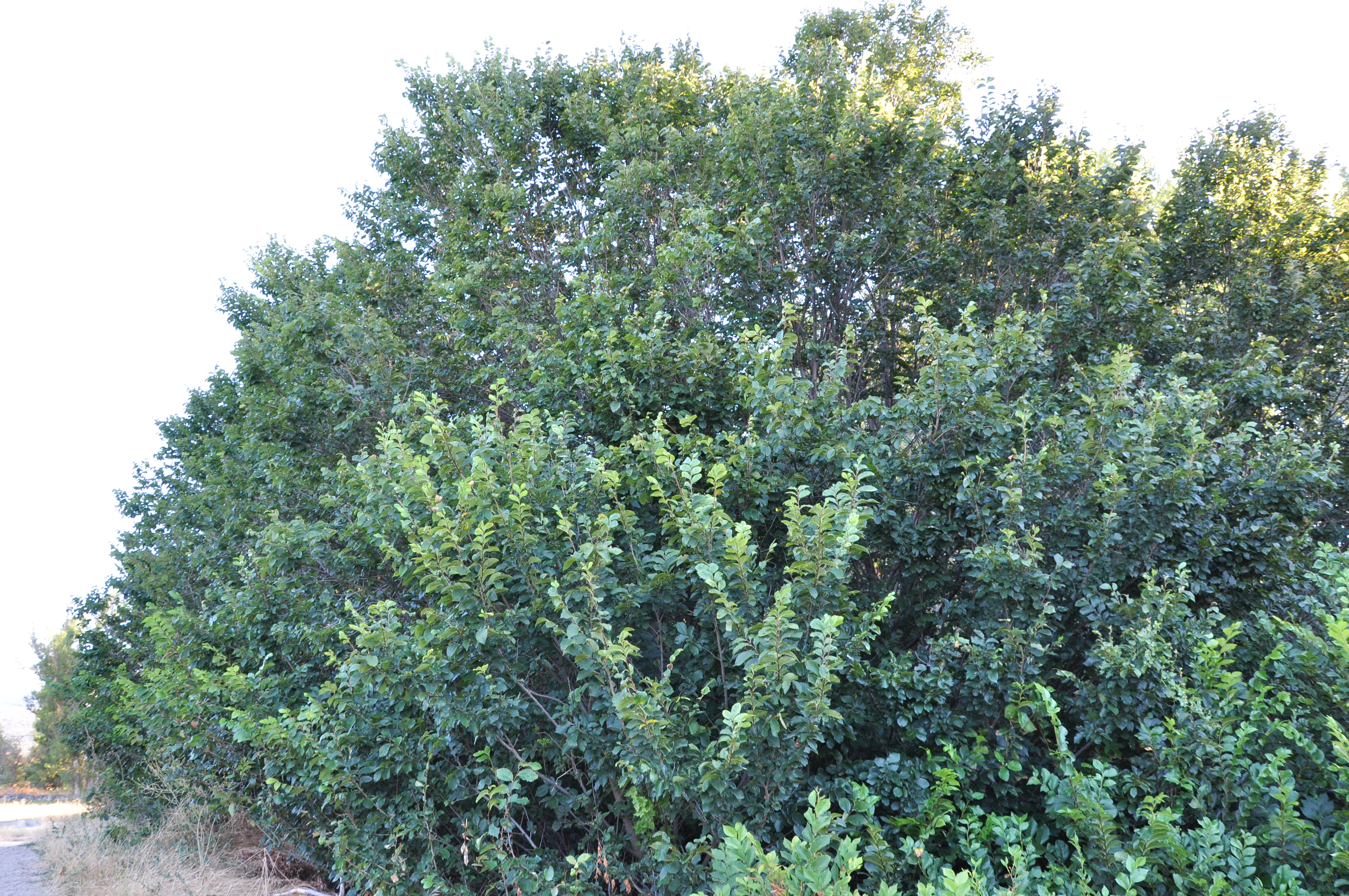
Root-suckers spreading from field elm U. minor

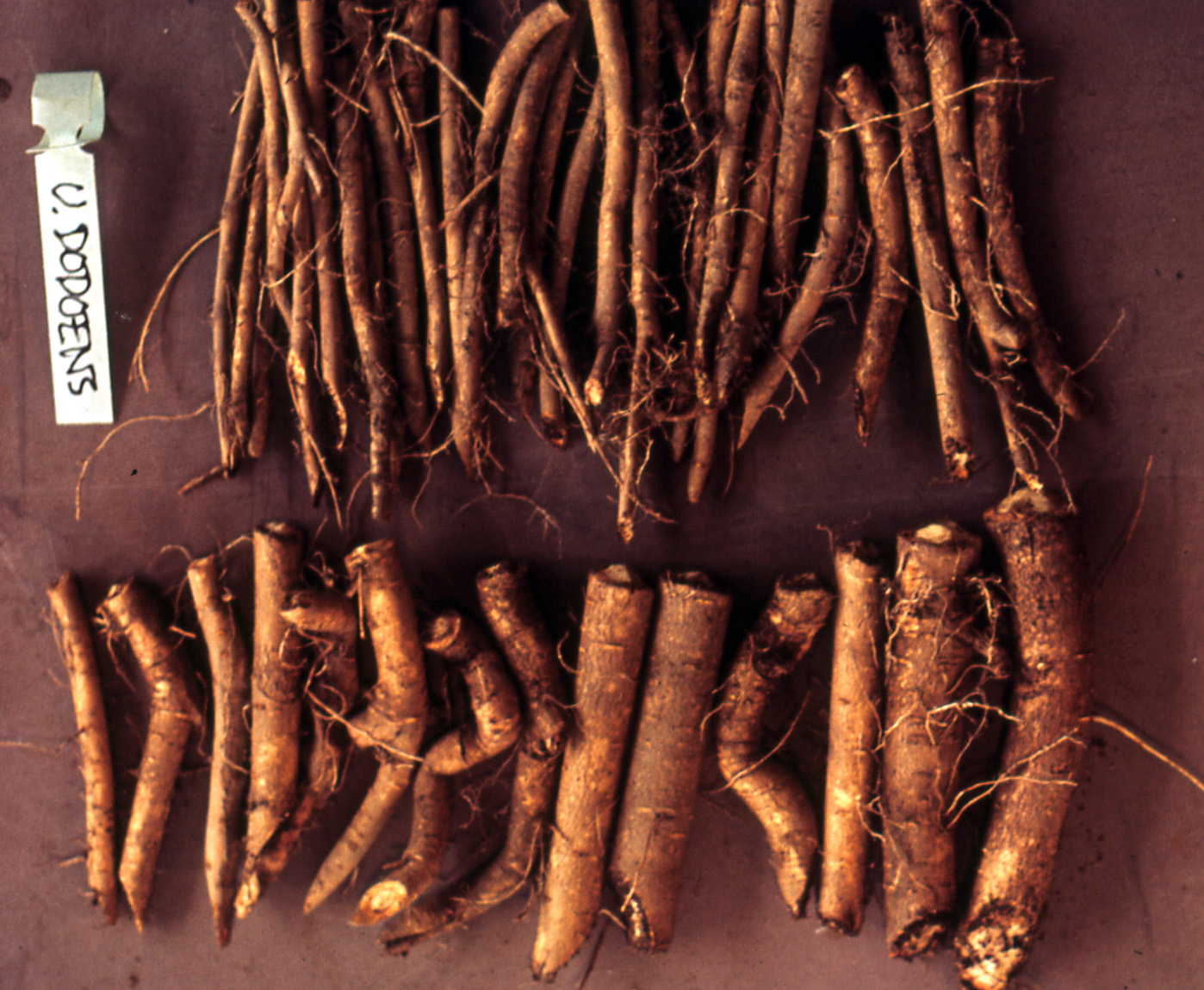
Root cuttings of U. 'Dodoens'

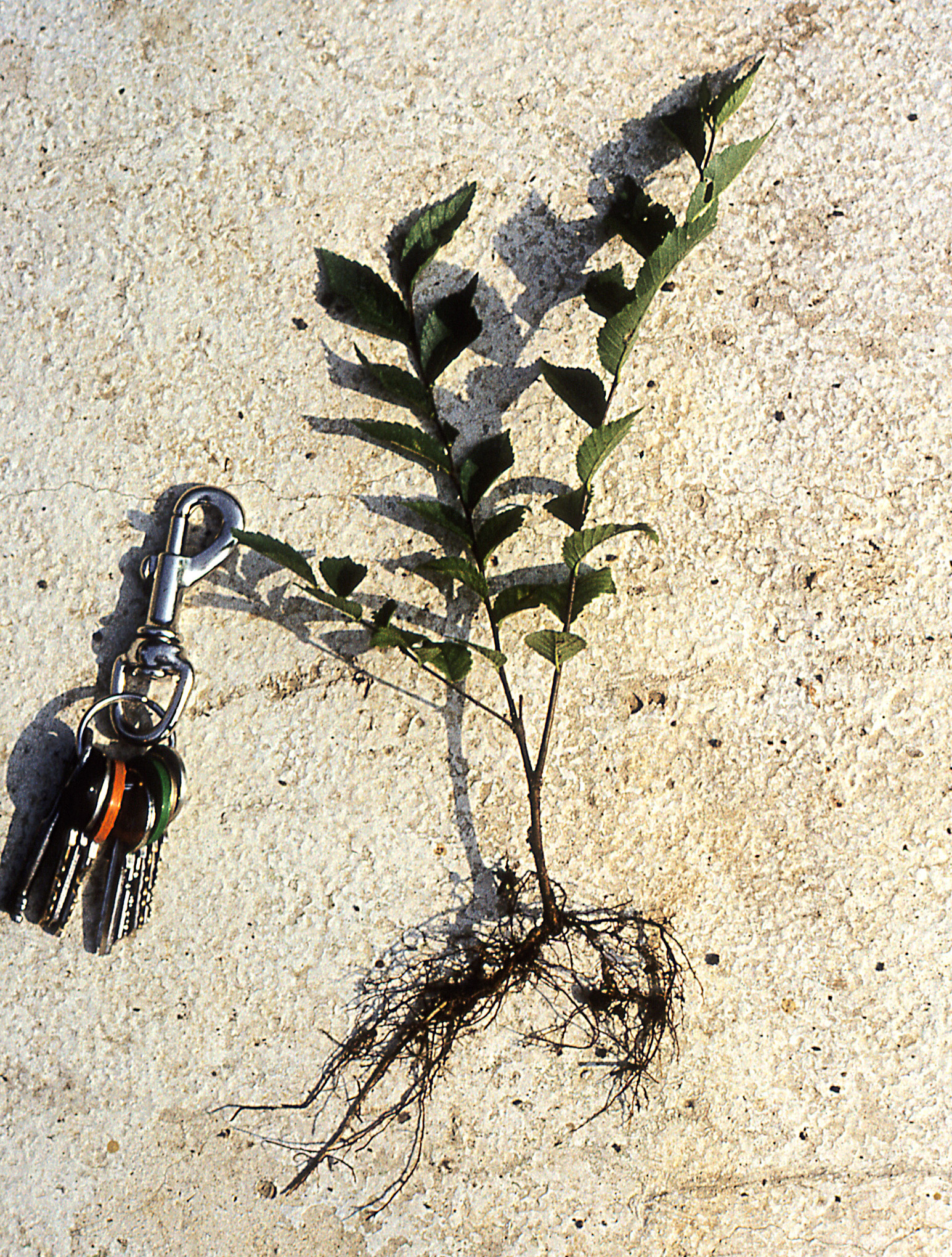
Rooted hardwood elm cutting

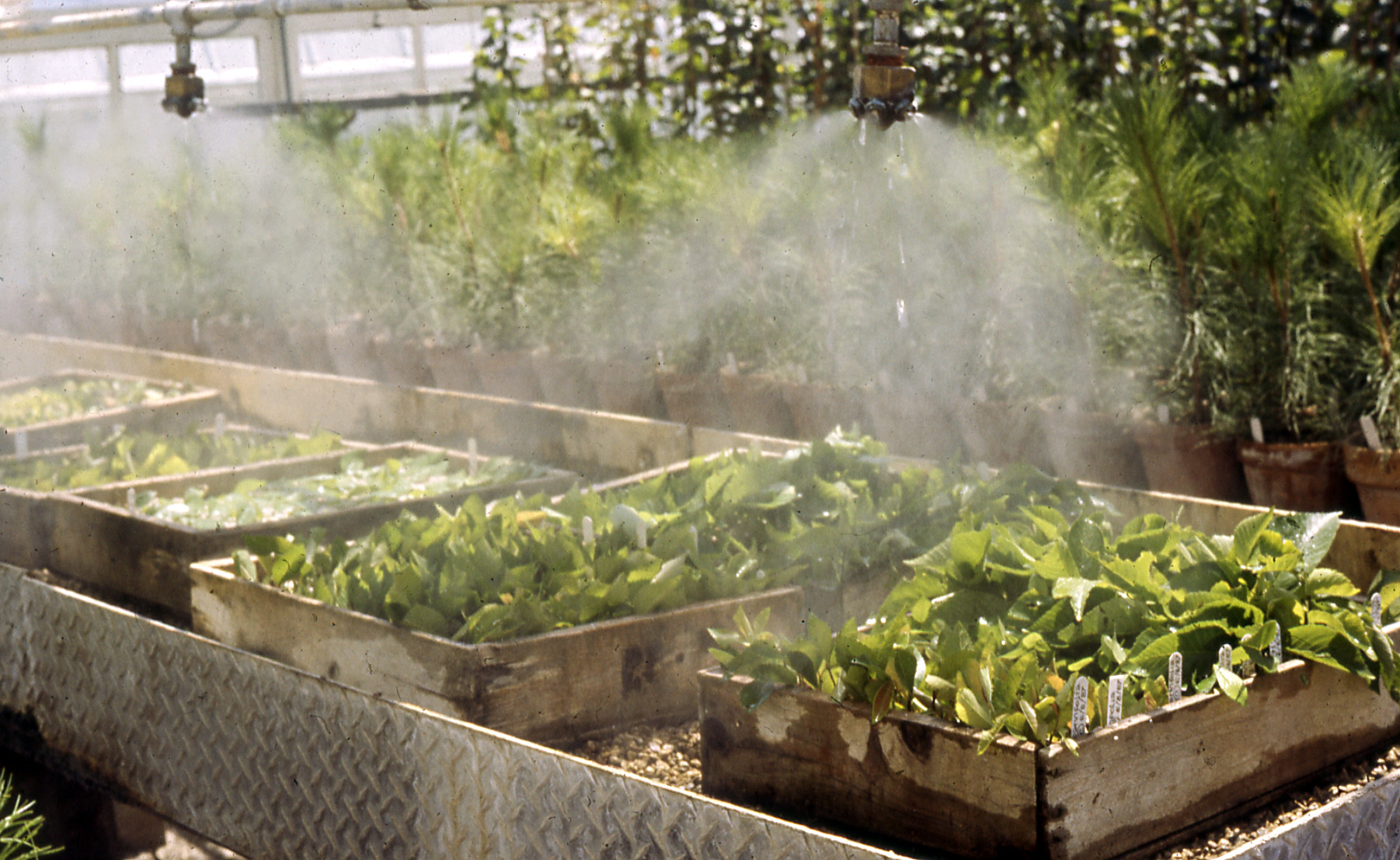
Rooting of softwood cuttings under mist

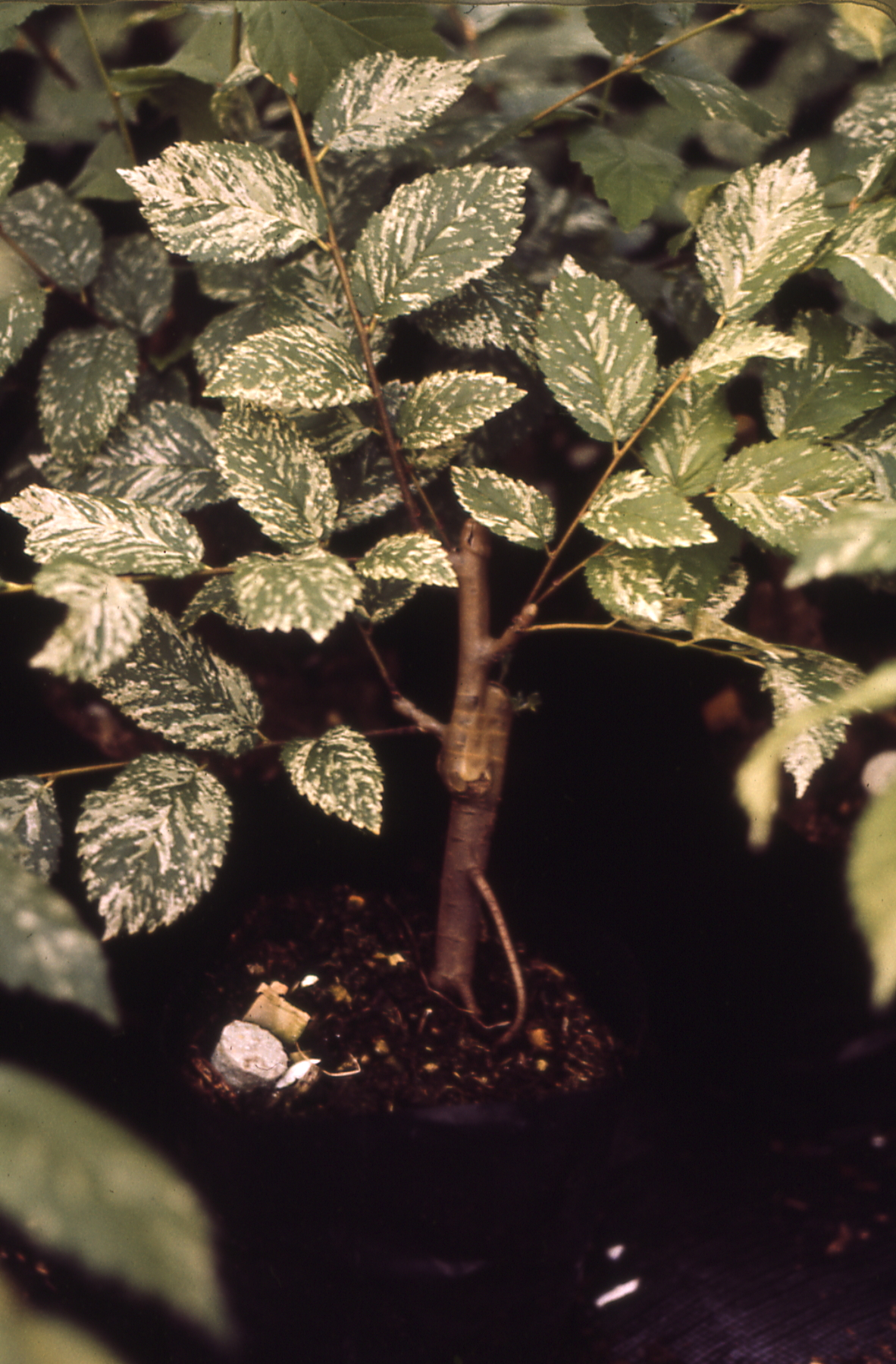
Mutant variegated smooth-leafed elm graft

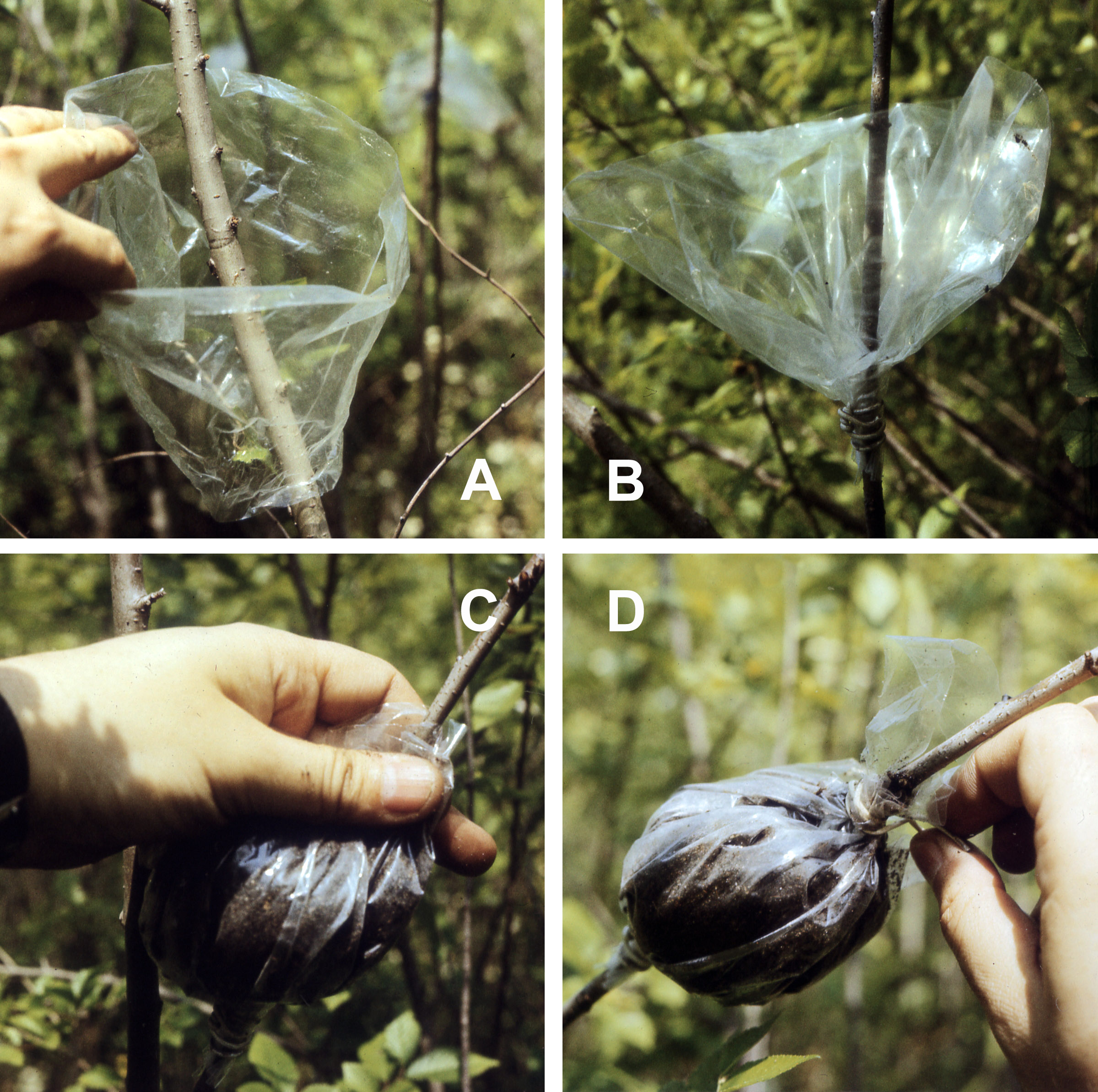
Air layering of U. pumila

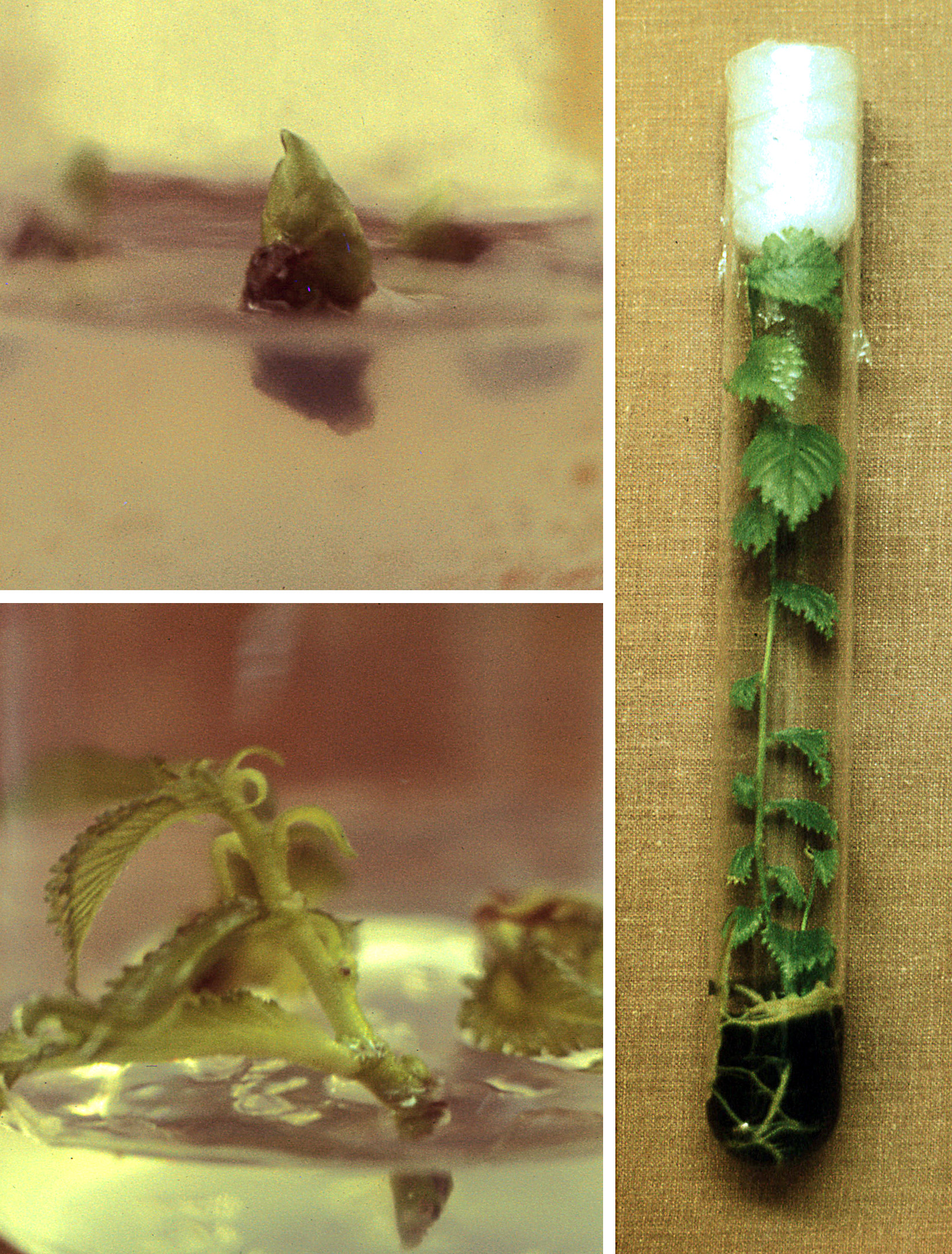
In vitro propagation of U. chenmoui by bud meristem

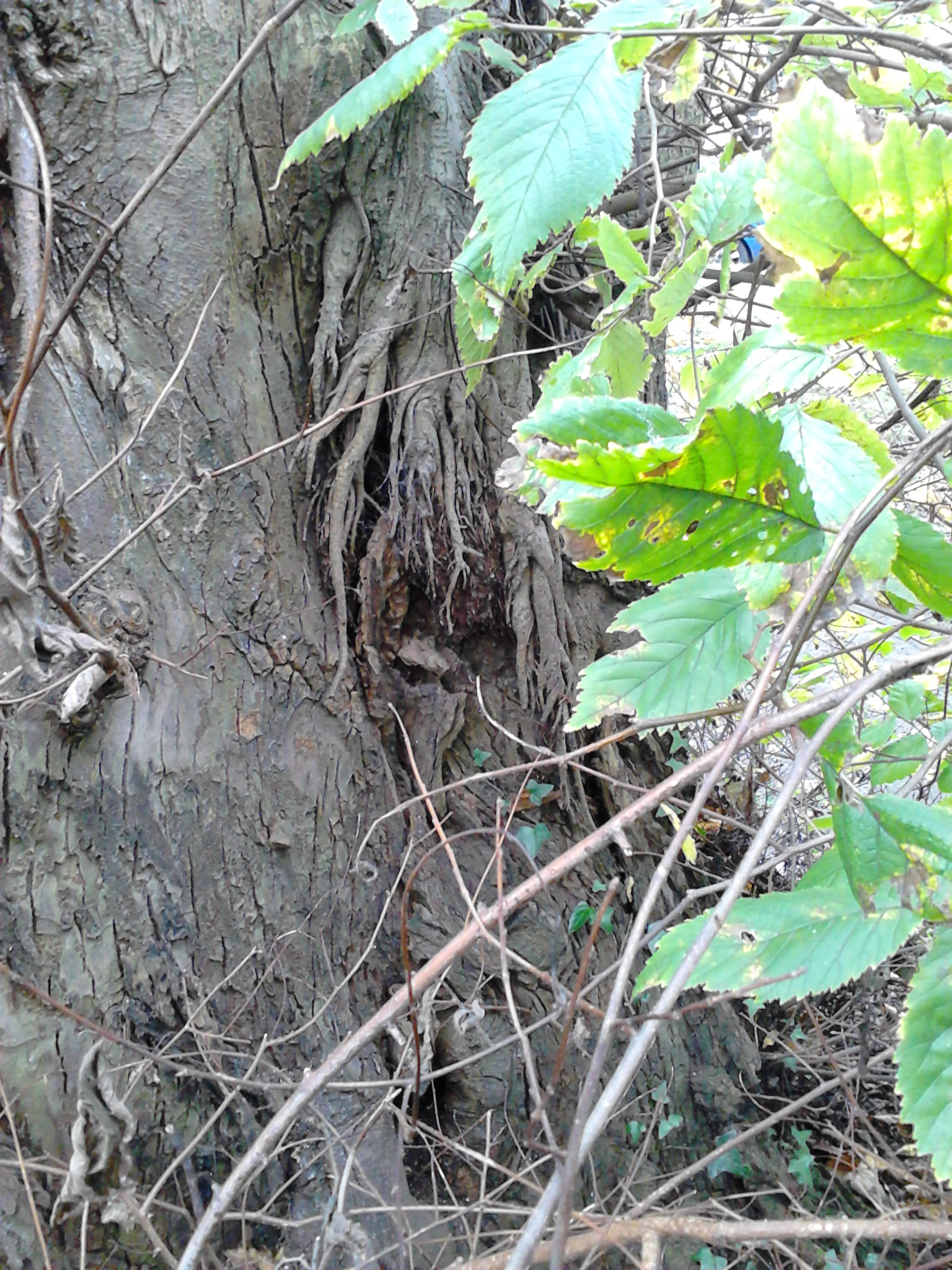
Aerial roots, hybrid elm cultivar

=== Associated organisms ===
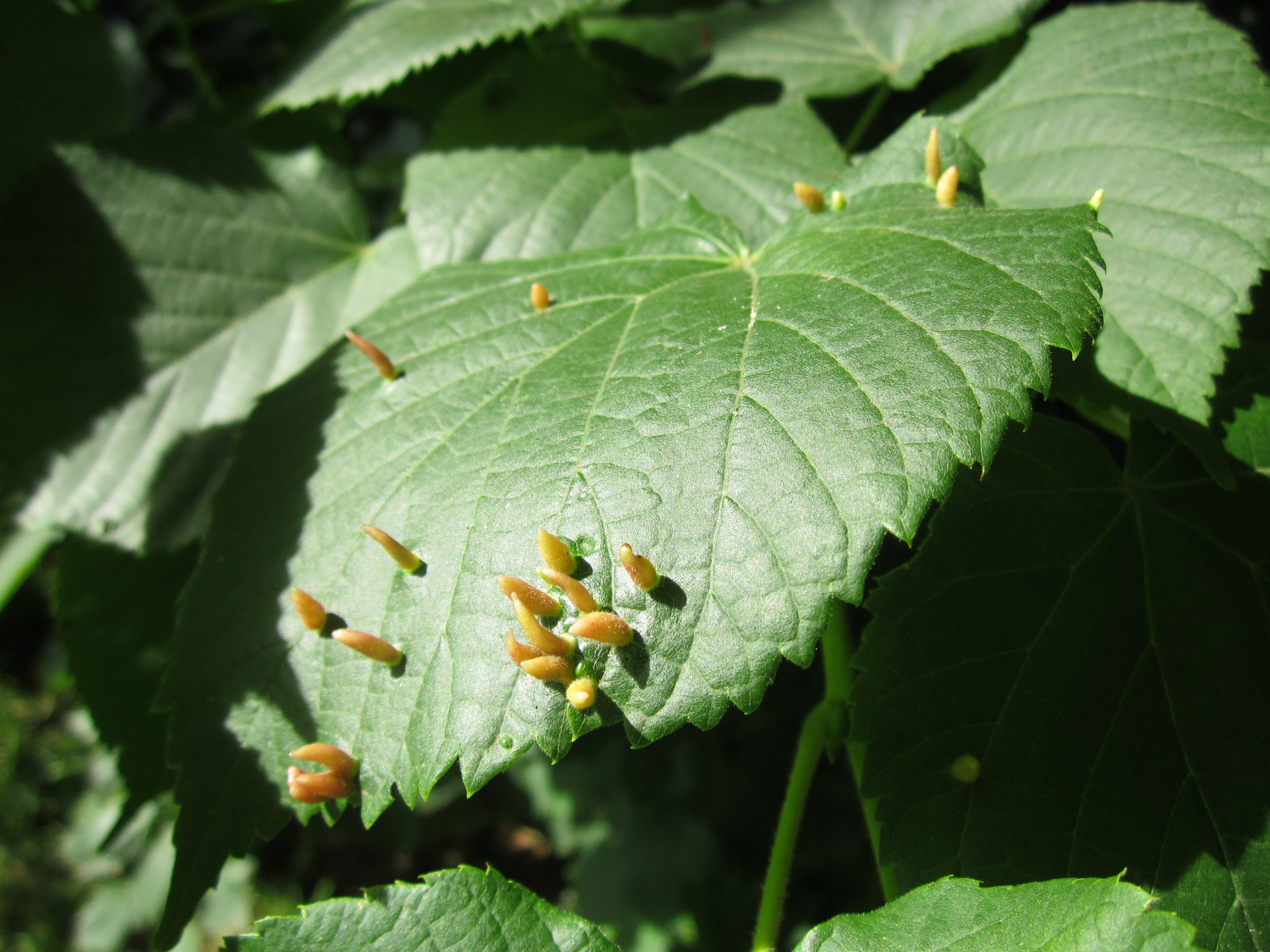
Pouch leaf galls on a wych elm (aphid Tetraneura ulmi), Germany

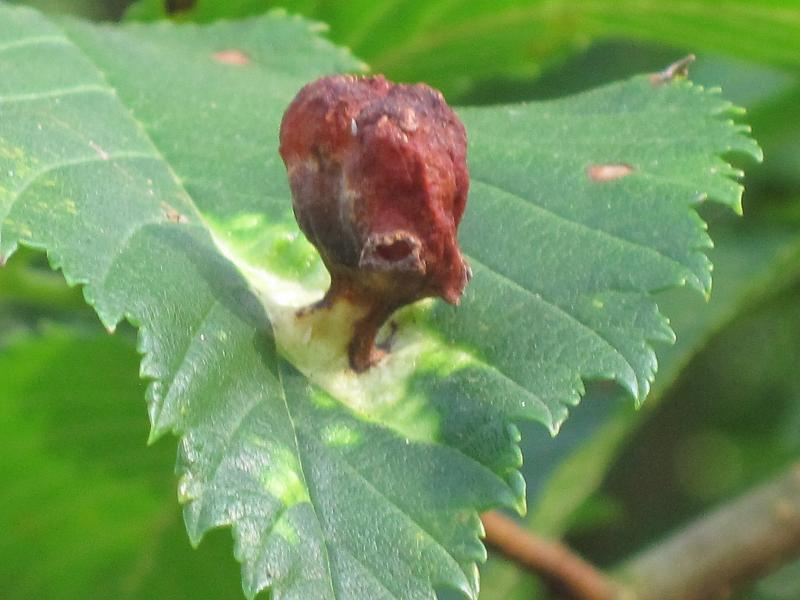
Pouch leaf gall on elm leaf (aphid T. ulmi), the Netherlands

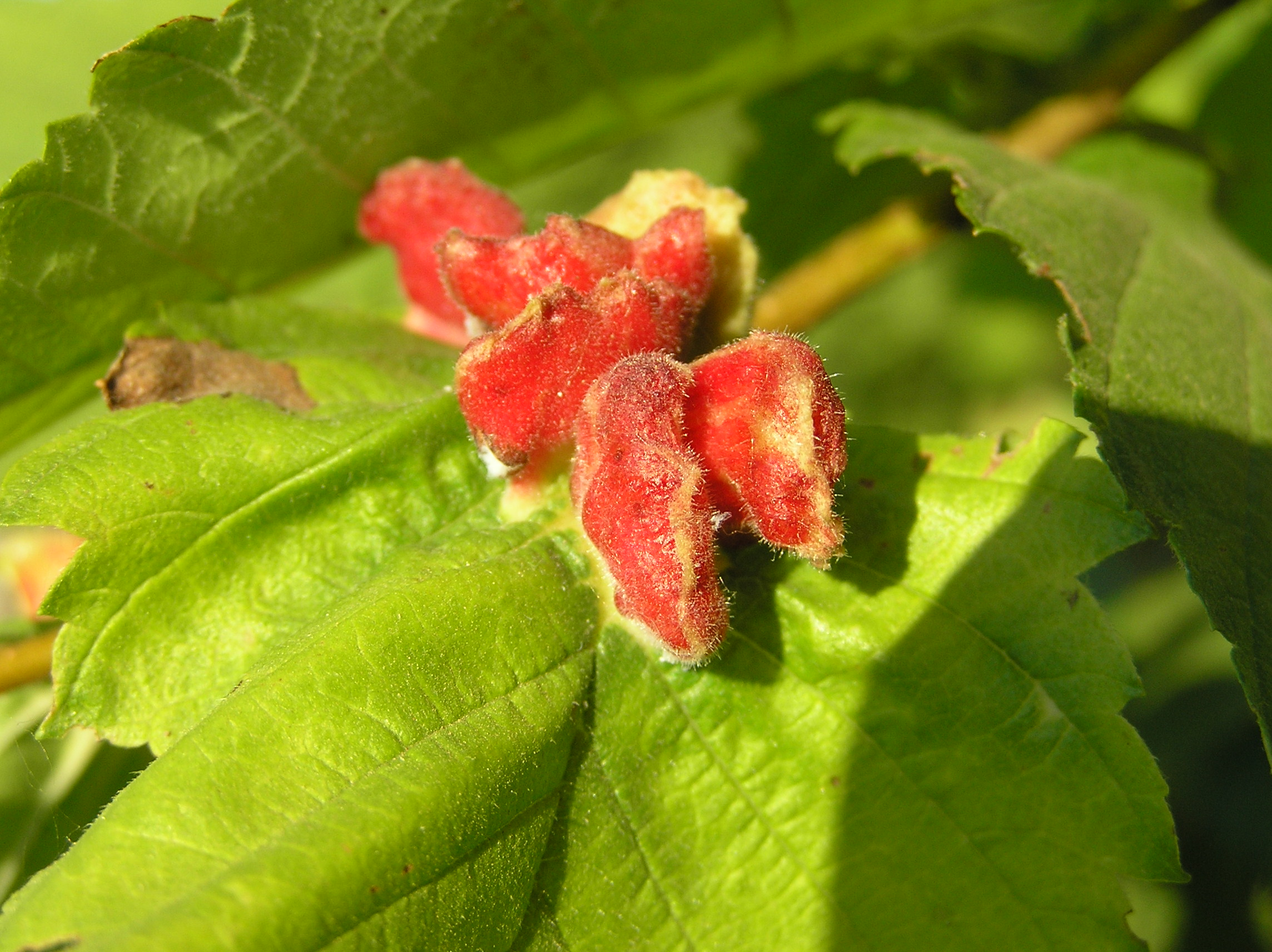
Cockscomb leaf galls (aphid Colopha compressa), Poland

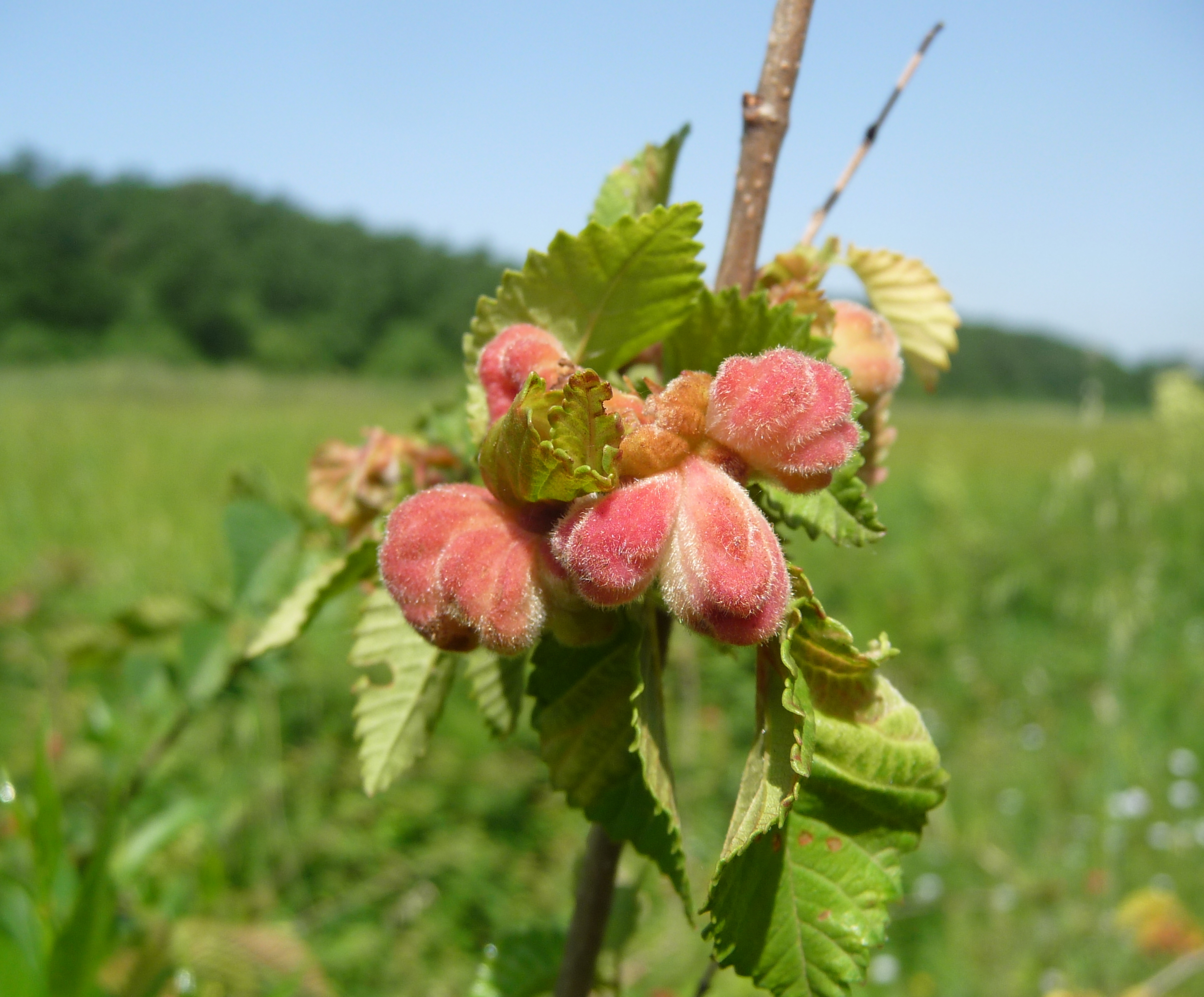
Bladder leaf galls on elm leaves (aphid Eriosoma lanuginosum), Italy

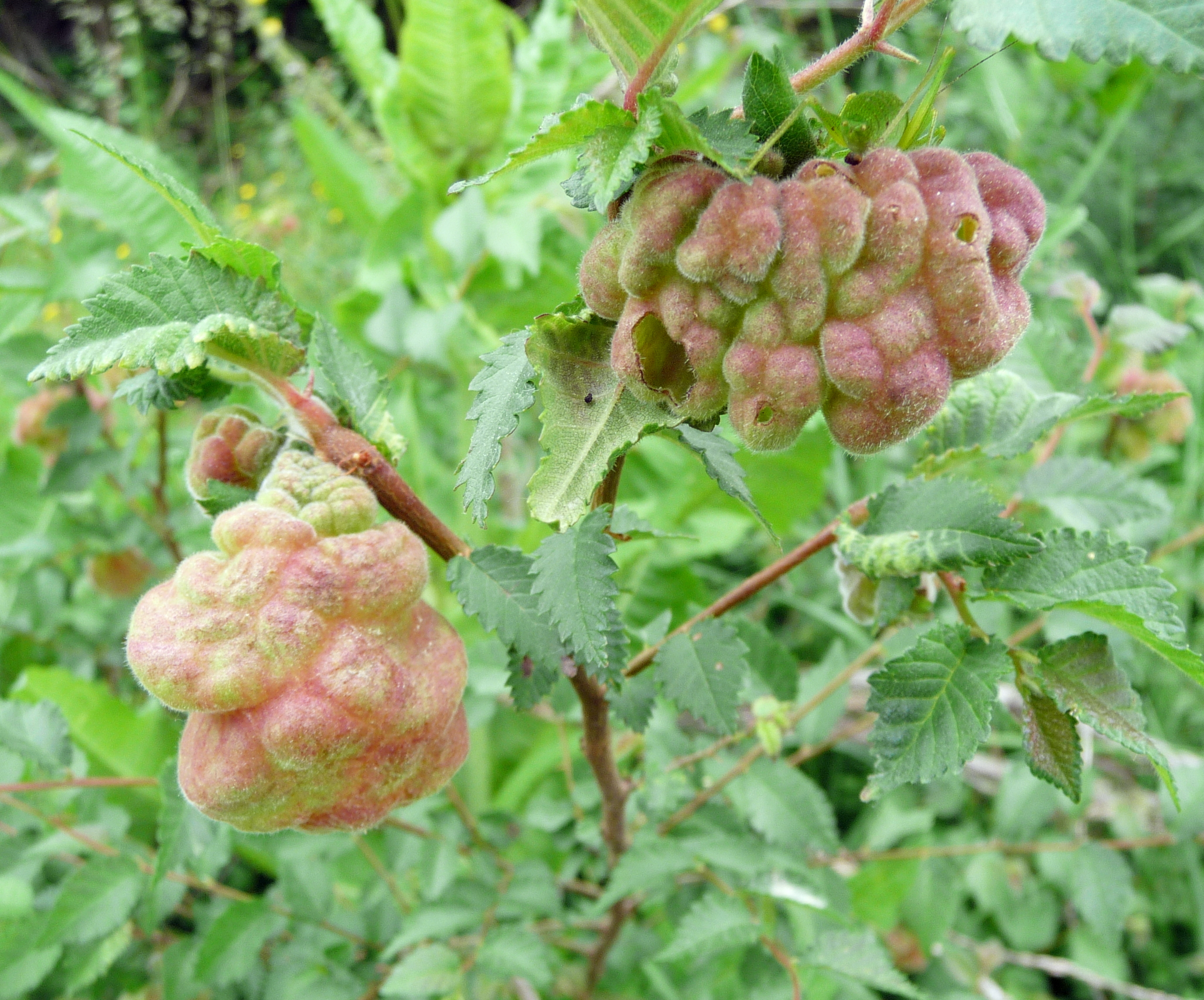
Bladder leaf galls on a narrow-leaved elm (aphid E. lanuginosum), Italy

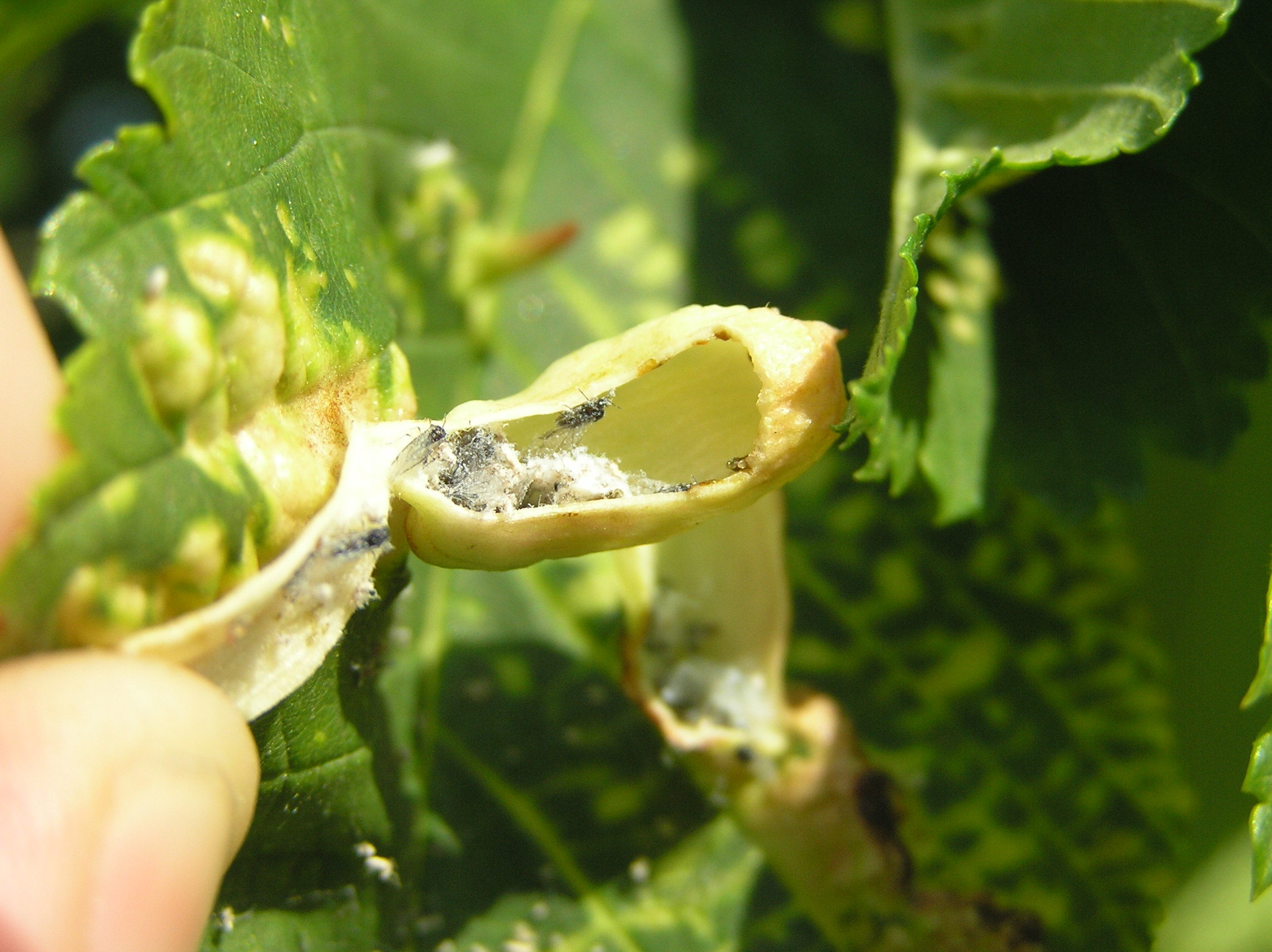
Aphids in leaf gall, Poland

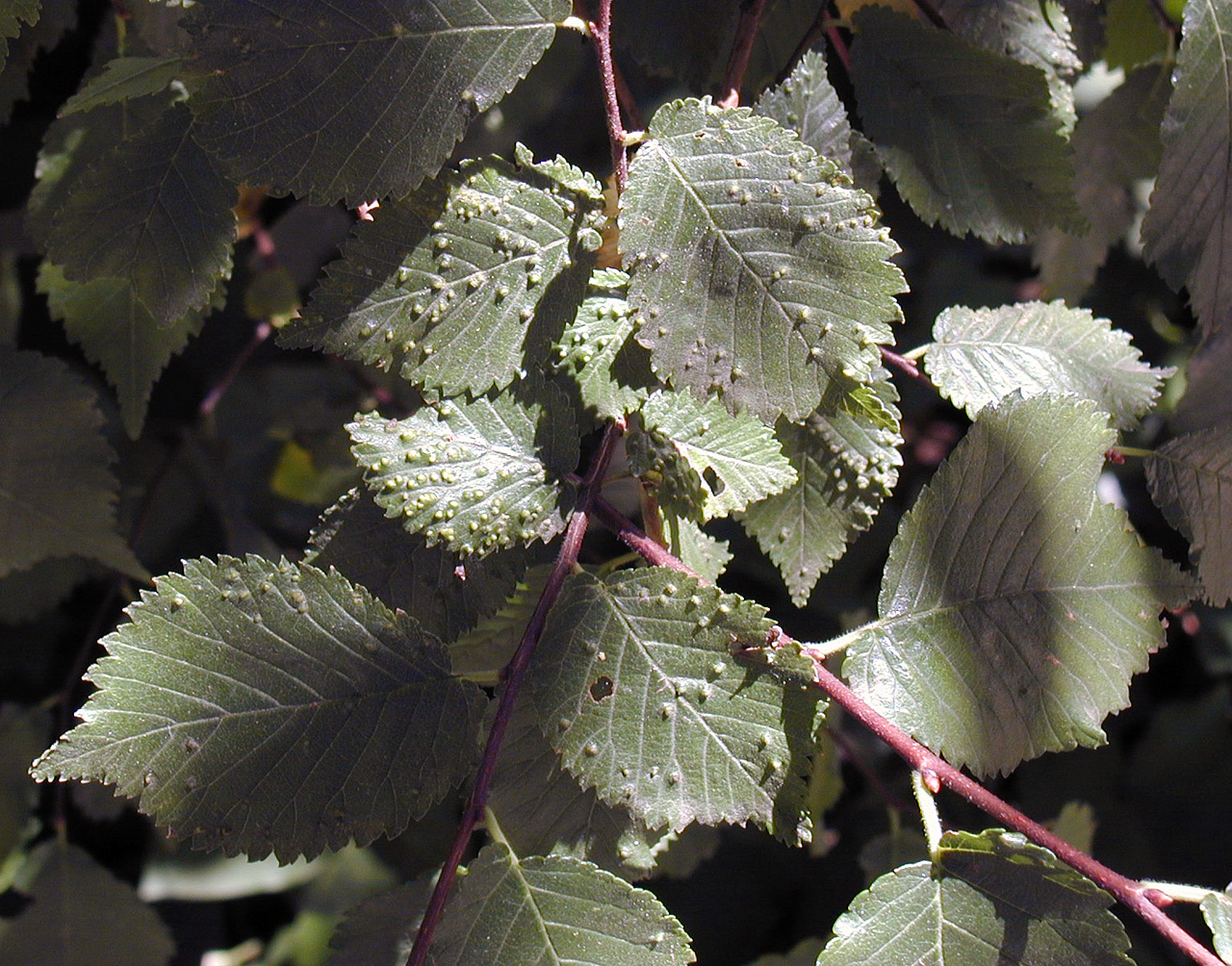
Pimple leaf galls on a field elm (mite Eriophyes ulmi), Spain

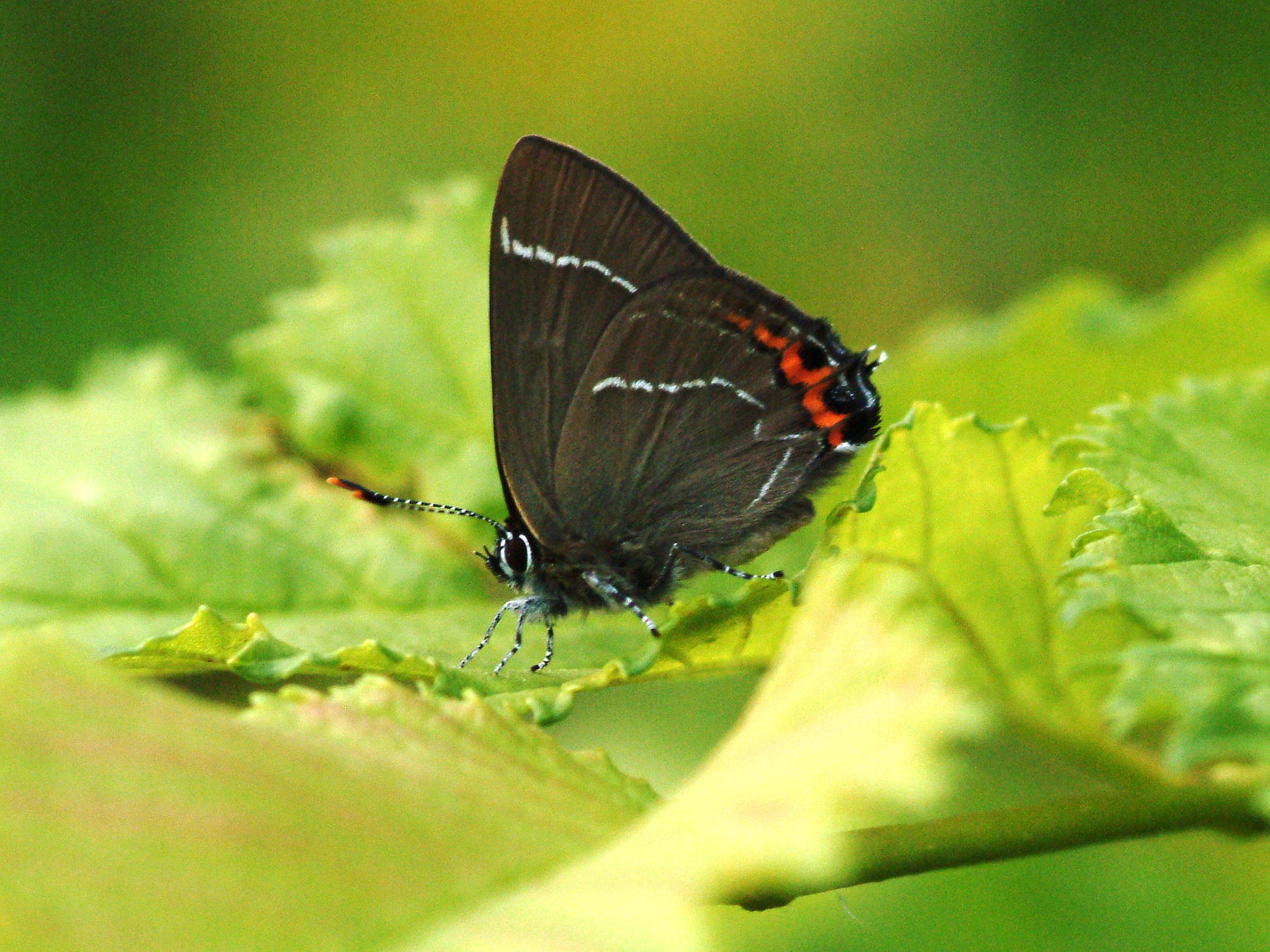
White-letter hairstreak Satyrium w-album, on Lutece, Sweden: The larvae feed only on elm.

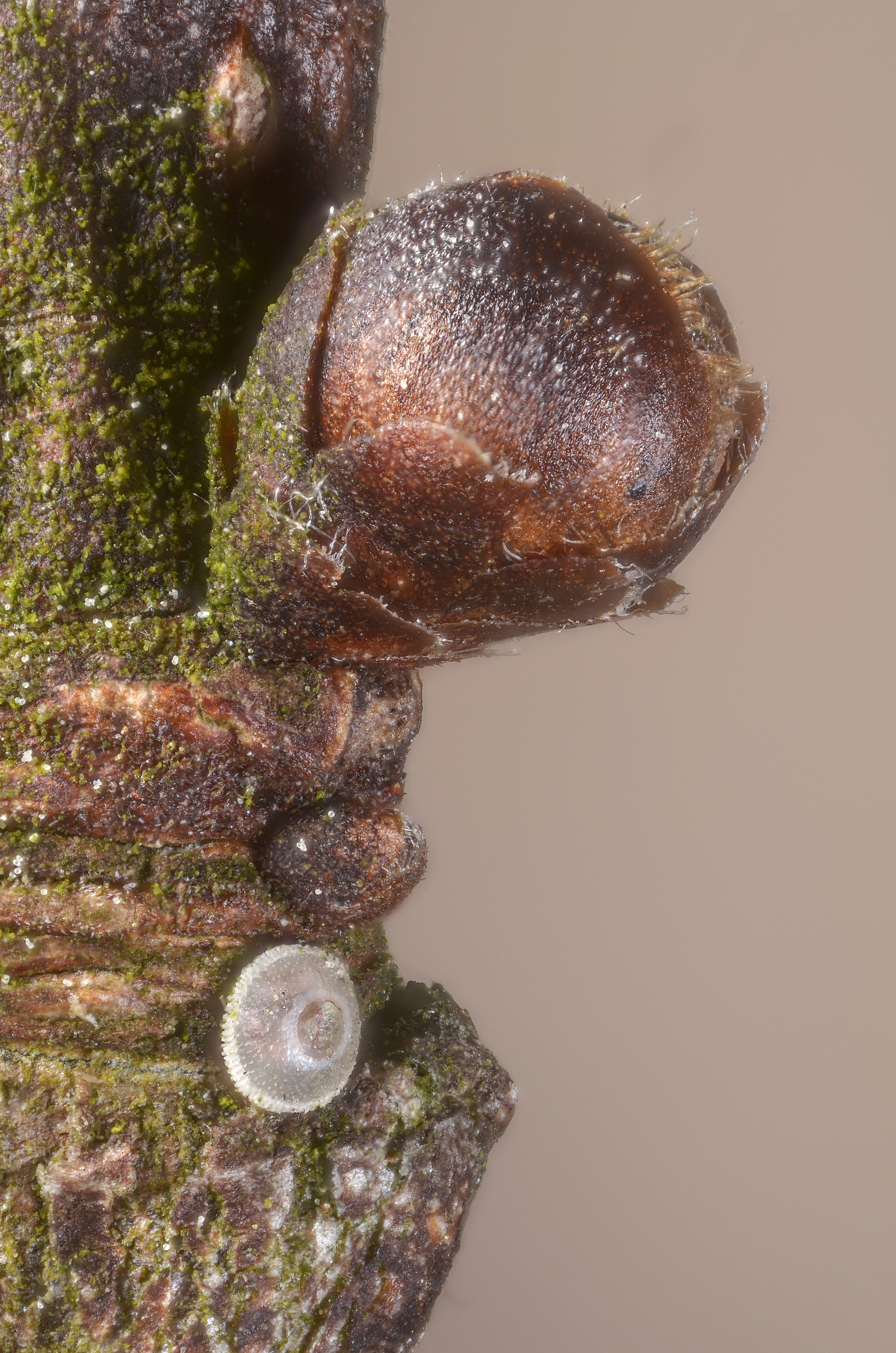
Egg of Satyrium w-album near flower-bud of an elm

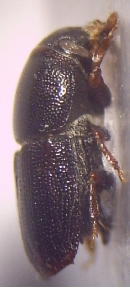
Elm-bark beetle Scolytus multistriatus (size: 2–3 mm), a vector for Dutch elm disease

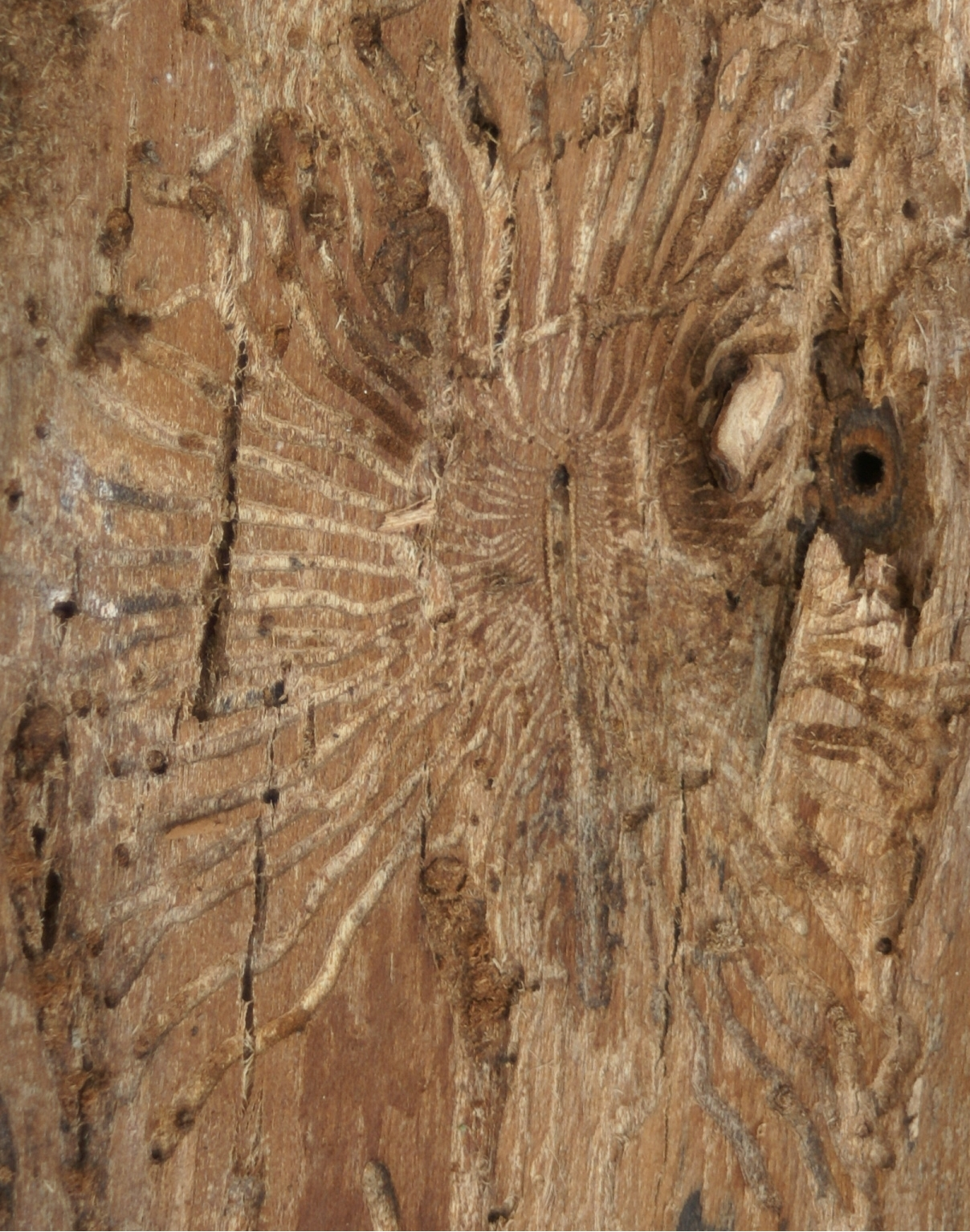
Scolytus multistriatus galleries under elm bark

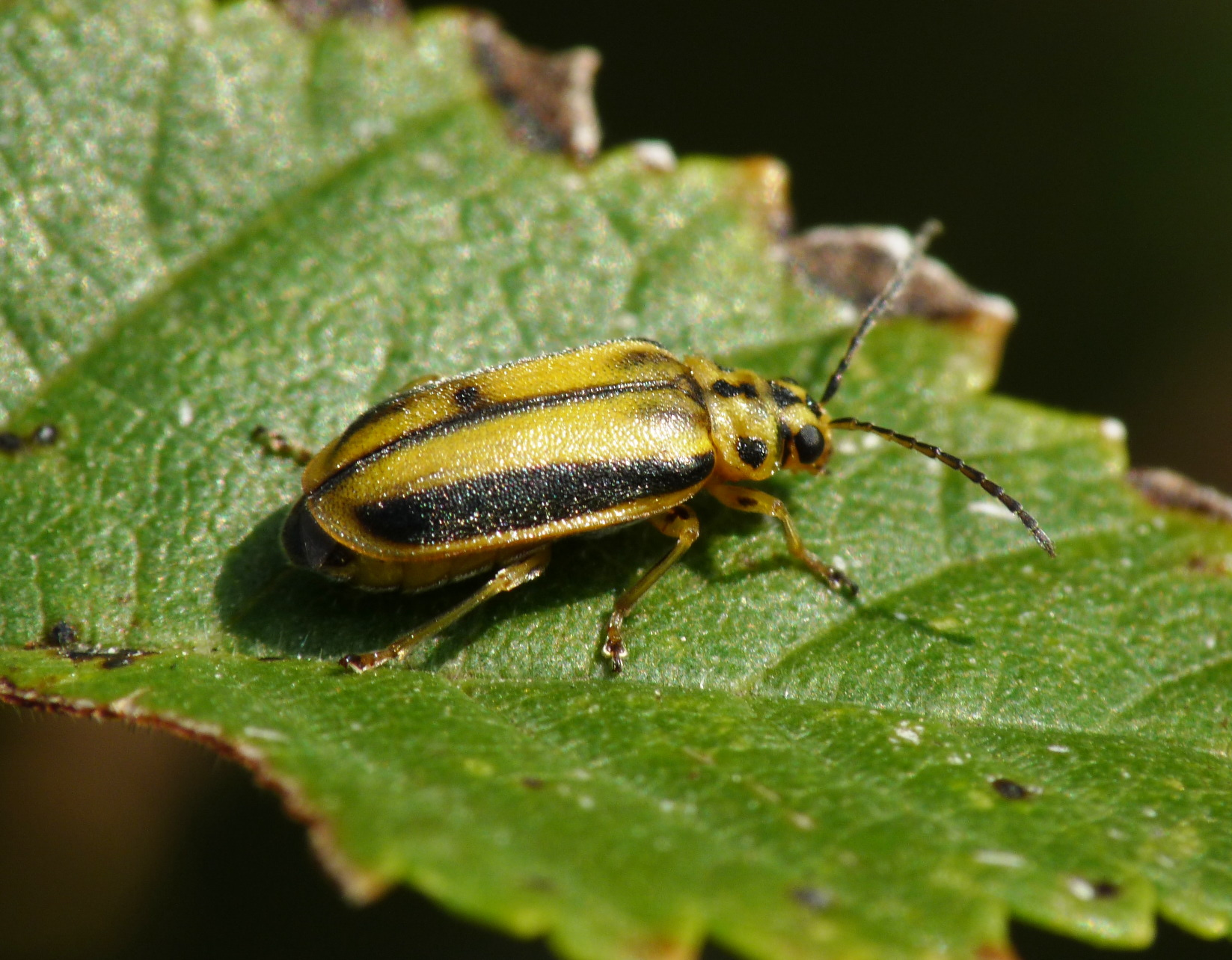
Elm-leaf beetle Xanthogaleruca luteola, which causes serious damage to elm foliage

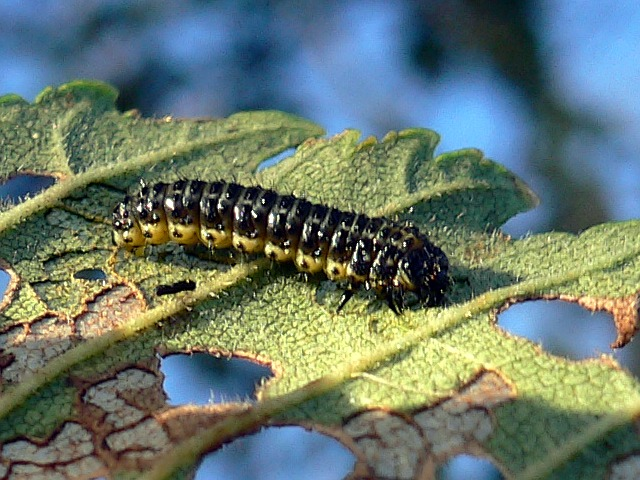
Xanthogaleruca luteola caterpillar on elm leaf, Germany

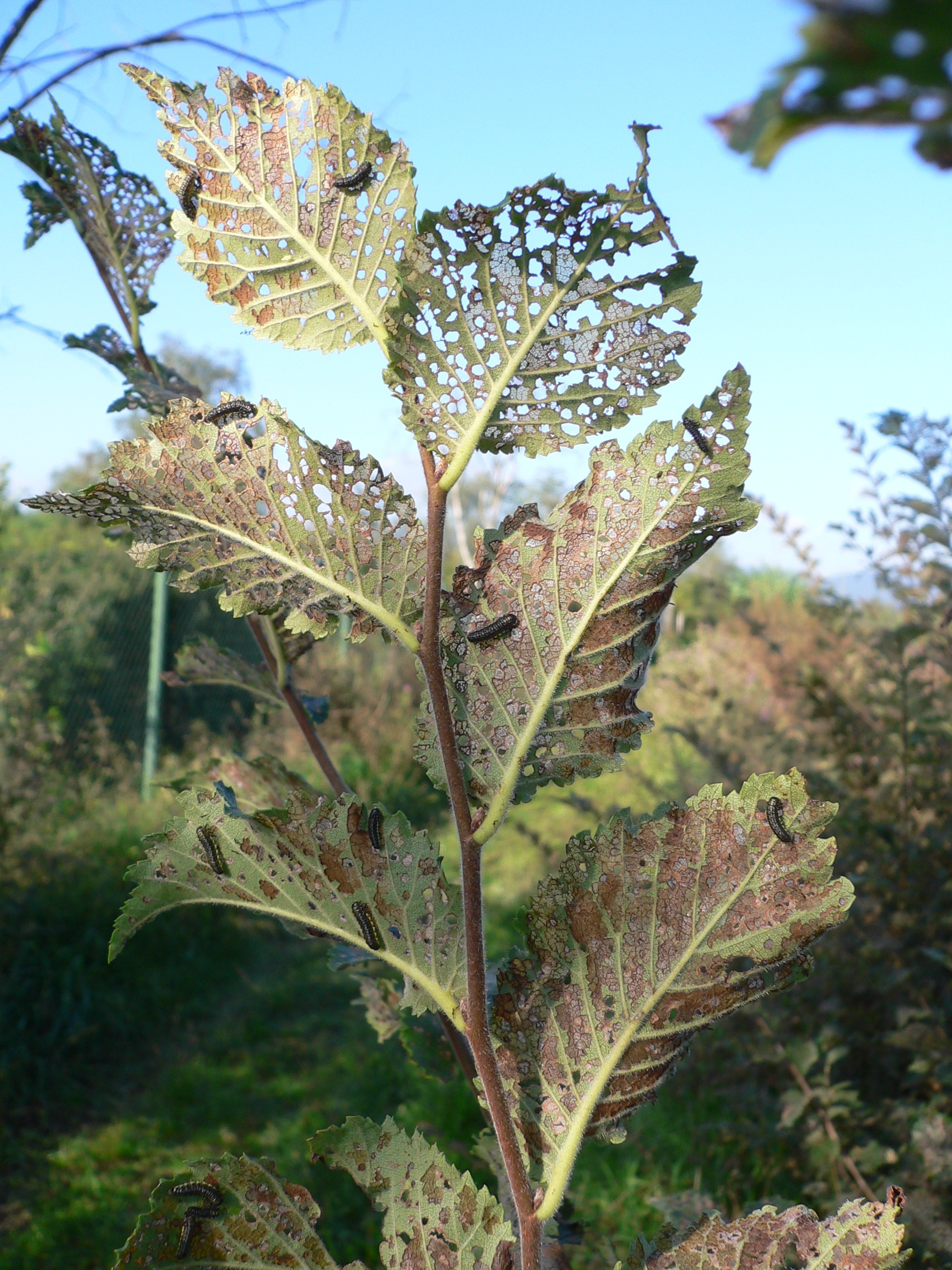
Elm-leaf damage caused by X. luteola, Germany

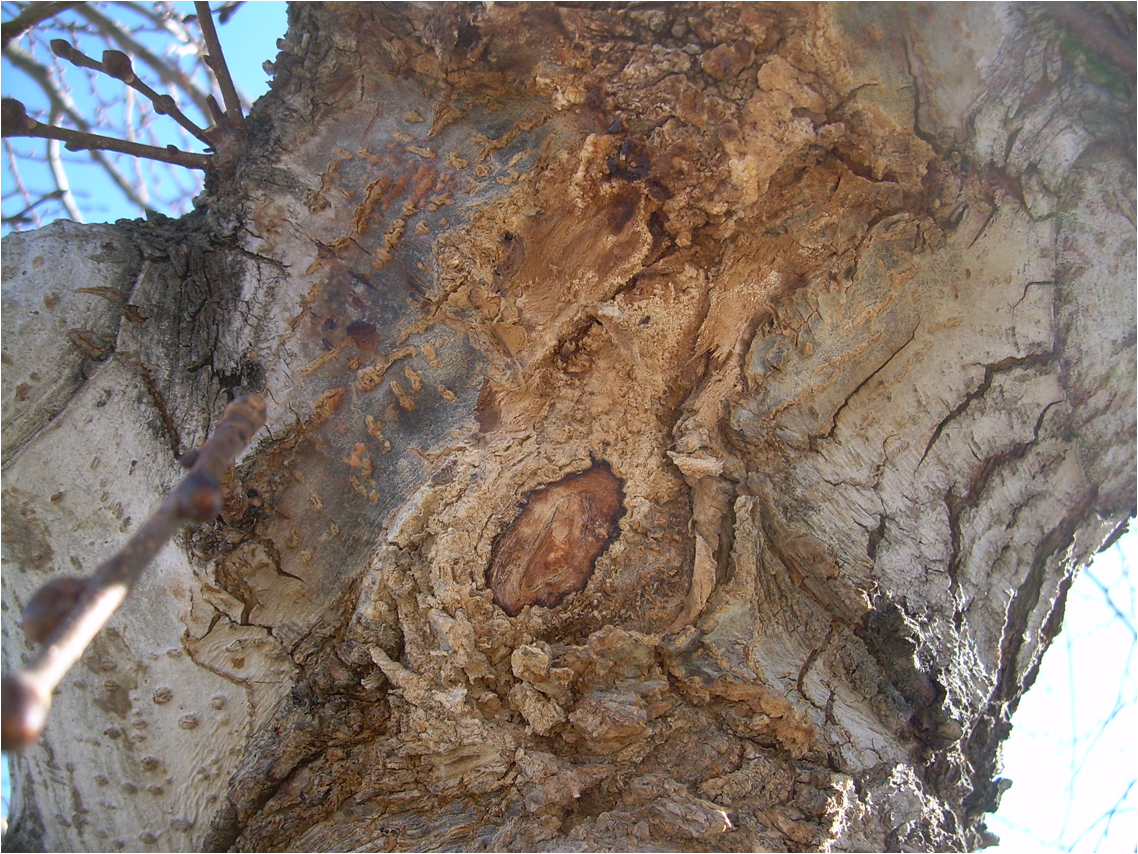
Bacterial infection Erwinia carotovora of elm sap, which causes slime flux (wetwood) and staining of the trunk (here on a 'Camperdown' elm)

=== Pests and diseases ===
==== Dutch elm disease ====
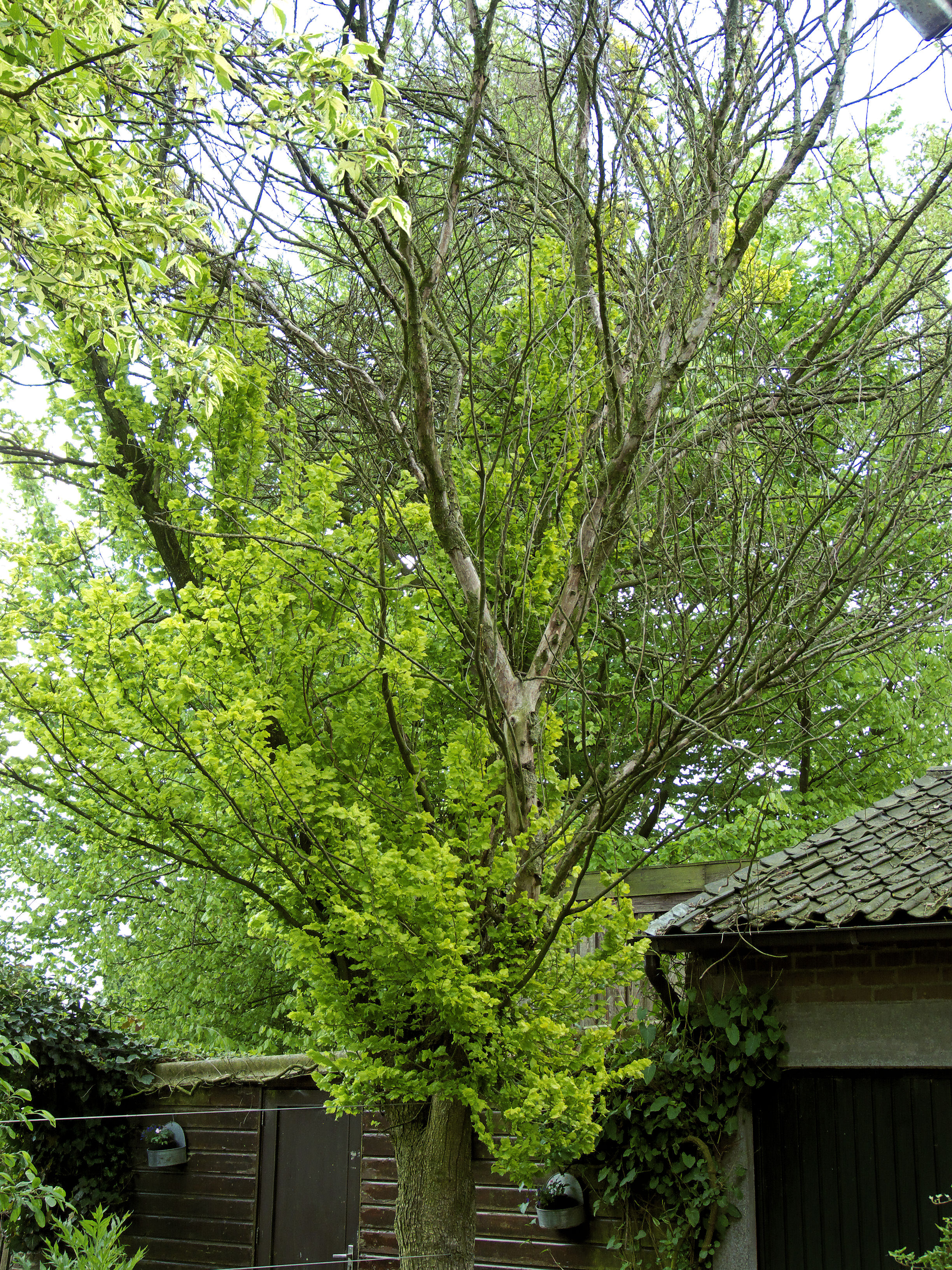
Golden elm tree with Dutch elm disease

Dutch elm disease (DED) devastated elms throughout Europe and much of North America in the second half of the 20th century. It derives its name "Dutch" from the first description of the disease and its cause in the 1920s by Dutch botanists Bea Schwarz and Christina Johanna Buisman. Owing to its geographical isolation and effective quarantine enforcement, Australia has so far remained unaffected by DED, as have the provinces of Alberta and British Columbia in western Canada.

DED is caused by a microfungus transmitted by two species of Scolytus elm-bark beetles, which act as vectors. The disease affects all species of elms native to North America and Europe, but many Asiatic species have evolved antifungal genes and are resistant. Fungal spores, introduced into wounds in the tree caused by the beetles, invade the xylem or vascular system. The tree responds by producing tyloses, effectively blocking the flow from roots to leaves. Woodland trees in North America are not quite as susceptible to the disease because they usually lack the root grafting of the urban elms and are somewhat more isolated from each other. In France, inoculation with the fungus of over 300 clones of the European species failed to find a single variety that possessed of any significant resistance.

The first, less aggressive strain of the disease fungus, Ophiostoma ulmi, arrived in Europe from Asia in 1910, and was accidentally introduced to North America in 1928. It was steadily weakened by viruses in Europe and had all but disappeared by the 1940s. However, the disease had a much greater and longer-lasting impact in North America, owing to the greater susceptibility of the American elm, Ulmus americana, which masked the emergence of the second, far more virulent strain of the disease Ophiostoma novo-ulmi. It appeared in the United States sometime in the 1940s, and was originally believed to be a mutation of O. ulmi. Limited gene flow from O. ulmi to O. novo-ulmi was probably responsible for the creation of the North American subspecies O. novo-ulmi subsp. americana. It was first recognized in Britain in the early 1970s, believed to have been introduced via a cargo of Canadian rock elm destined for the boatbuilding industry, and rapidly eradicated most of the mature elms from western Europe. A second subspecies, O. novo-ulmi subsp. novo-ulmi, caused similar devastation in Eastern and Central Europe. This subspecies, which was introduced to North America, and like O. ulmi, is thought to have originated in Asia. The two subspecies have now hybridized in Europe where their ranges have overlapped. The hypothesis that O. novo-ulmi arose from a hybrid of the original O. ulmi and another strain endemic to the Himalayas, Ophiostoma himal-ulmi, is now discredited.

No sign indicates the current pandemic is waning, and no evidence has been found of a susceptibility of the fungus to a disease of its own caused by d-factors: naturally occurring virus-like agents that severely debilitated the original O. ulmi and reduced its sporulation.

==== Elm phloem necrosis ====
Elm phloem necrosis (elm yellows) is a disease of elm trees that is spread by leafhoppers or by root grafts. This very aggressive disease, with no known cure, occurs in the Eastern United States, southern Ontario in Canada, and Europe. It is caused by phytoplasmas that infect the phloem (inner bark) of the tree. Infection and death of the phloem effectively girdles the tree and stops the flow of water and nutrients. The disease affects both wild-growing and cultivated trees. Occasionally, cutting the infected tree before the disease completely establishes itself and cleanup and prompt disposal of infected matter has resulted in the plant's survival via stump sprouts.

==== Insects ====
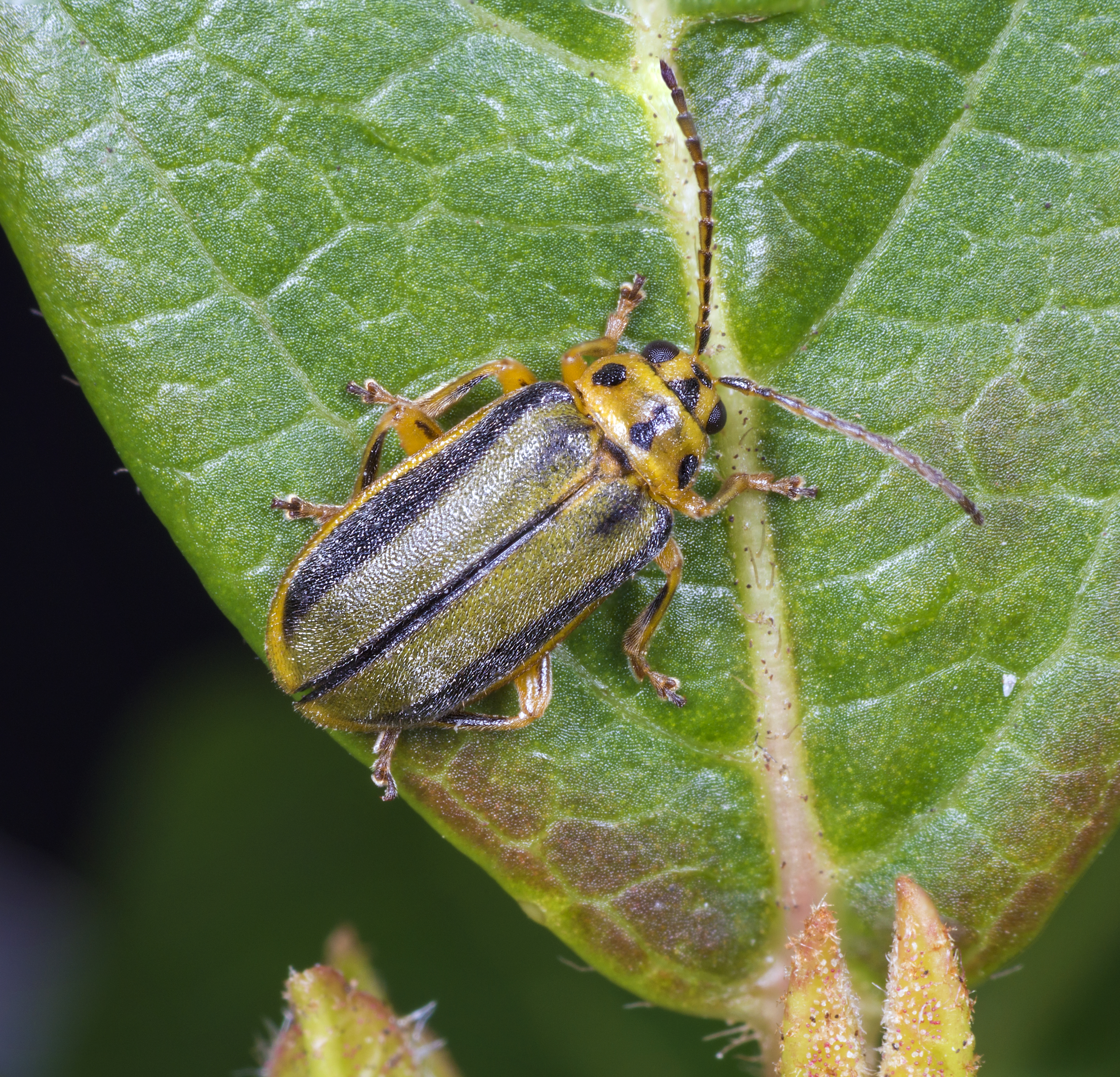
The elm leaf beetle

Most serious of the elm pests is the elm leaf beetle Xanthogaleruca luteola, which can decimate foliage, although rarely with fatal results. The beetle was accidentally introduced to North America from Europe. Another unwelcome immigrant to North America is the Japanese beetle Popillia japonica. In both instances, the beetles cause far more damage in North America owing to the absence of the predators in their native lands. In Australia, introduced elm trees are sometimes used as food plants by the larvae of hepialid moths of the genus Aenetus. These burrow horizontally into the trunk then vertically down. Circa 2000, the Asian Zig-zag sawfly Aproceros leucopoda appeared in Europe and North America, although in England, its impact has been minimal and it is no longer monitored.

==== Birds ====
Sapsucker woodpeckers may have a preference for live elm trees.

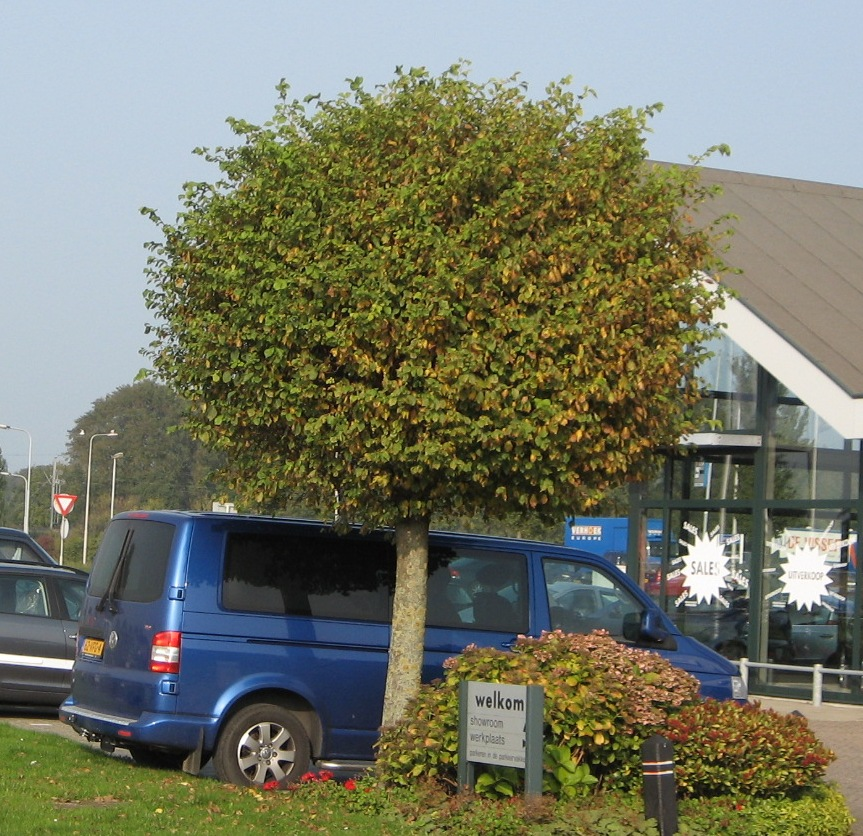
The ball-headed graft narvan elm, Ulmus minor 'Umbraculifera', cultivated in Persia and widely planted in central Asia

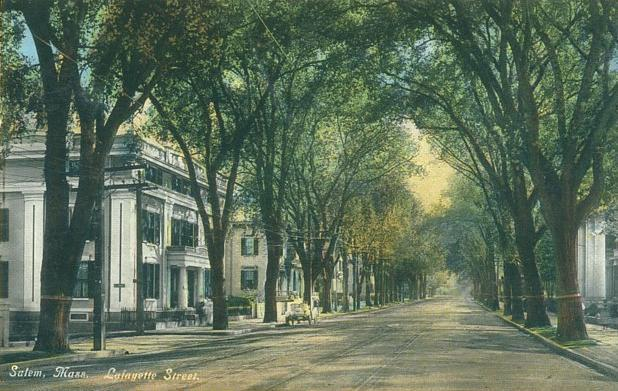
Lafayette Street in Salem, Massachusetts - an example of the high-tunnelled effects of Ulmus americana avenues once common in New England (colorized postcard, 1910)

== Cultivation ==
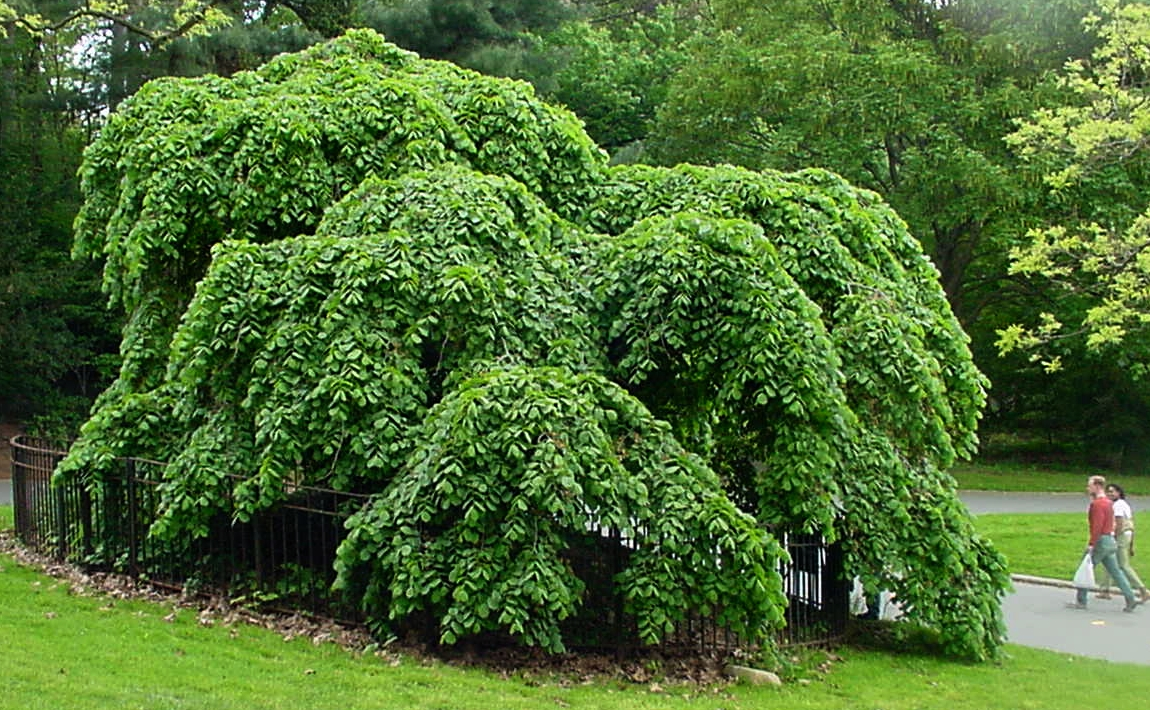
Camperdown elm (Ulmus glabra 'Camperdownii'), cultivated in Prospect Park, Brooklyn, New York

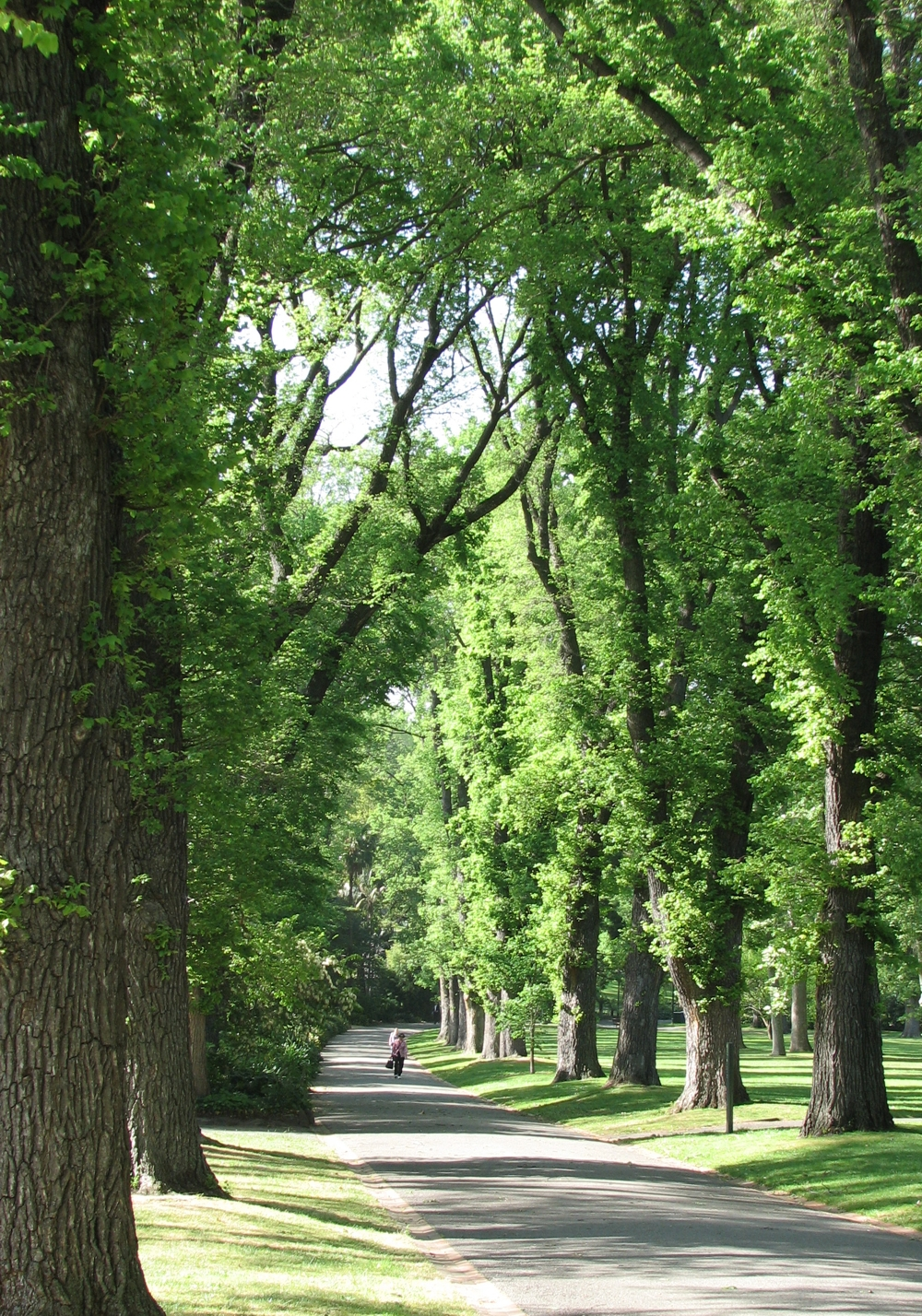
An avenue of elm trees in Fitzroy Gardens, Melbourne

One of the earliest of ornamental elms was the ball-headed graft narvan elm, Ulmus minor 'Umbraculifera', cultivated from time immemorial in Persia as a shade tree and widely planted in cities through much of south-west and central Asia. From the 18th century to the early 20th century, elms, whether species, hybrids, or cultivars, were among the most widely planted ornamental trees in both Europe and North America. They were particularly popular as a street tree in avenue plantings in towns and cities, creating high-tunnelled effects. Their quick growth and variety of foliage and forms, their tolerance of air-pollution, and the comparatively rapid decomposition of their leaf litter in the fall were further advantages.

In North America, the species most commonly planted was the American elm (U. americana), which had unique properties that made it ideal for such use - rapid growth, adaptation to a broad range of climates and soils, strong wood, resistance to wind damage, and vase-like growth habit requiring minimal pruning. In Europe, the wych elm (U. glabra) and the field elm (U. minor) were the most widely planted in the countryside, the former in northern areas including Scandinavia and northern Britain, the latter further south. The hybrid between these two, Dutch elm (U. × hollandica), occurs naturally and was also commonly planted. In much of England, the English elm later came to dominate the horticultural landscape. Most commonly planted in hedgerows, it sometimes occurred in densities over 1000/km^{2}. In south-eastern Australia and New Zealand, large numbers of English and Dutch elms, as well as other species and cultivars, were planted as ornamentals following their introduction in the 19th century, while in northern Japan Japanese elm (U. davidiana var. japonica) was widely planted as a street tree. From about 1850 to 1920, the most prized small ornamental elm in parks and gardens was the 'Camperdown' elm (U. glabra 'Camperdownii'), a contorted, weeping cultivar of the wych elm grafted on to a nonweeping elm trunk to give a wide, spreading, and weeping fountain shape in large garden spaces.

In northern Europe, elms were among the few trees tolerant of saline deposits from sea spray, which can cause "salt-burning" and die-back. This tolerance made elms reliable both as shelterbelt trees exposed to sea wind, in particular along the coastlines of southern and western Britain and in the Low Countries, and as trees for coastal towns and cities.

This belle époque lasted until the First World War, when the elm began its slide into horticultural decline. The impact of the hostilities on Germany, the origin of at least 40 cultivars, coincided with an outbreak of the early strain of DED, Ophiostoma ulmi. The devastation caused by the Second World War, and the demise in 1944 of the huge Späth nursery in Berlin, only accelerated the process. The outbreak of the new, three times more virulent, strain of DED Ophiostoma novo-ulmi in the late 1960s, brought the tree to its nadir.

Since around 1990, the elm has enjoyed a renaissance through the successful development in North America and Europe of cultivars highly resistant to DED. Consequently, the total number of named cultivars, ancient and modern, now exceeds 300, although many of the older clones, possibly over 120, have been lost to cultivation. Some of the latter, however, were by today's standards inadequately described or illustrated before the pandemic, and a number may survive, or have regenerated, unrecognised. Enthusiasm for the newer clones often remains low owing to the poor performance of earlier, supposedly disease-resistant Dutch trees released in the 1960s and 1970s. In the Netherlands, sales of elm cultivars slumped from over 56,000 in 1989 to just 6,800 in 2004, whilst in the UK, only four of the new American and European releases were commercially available in 2008.

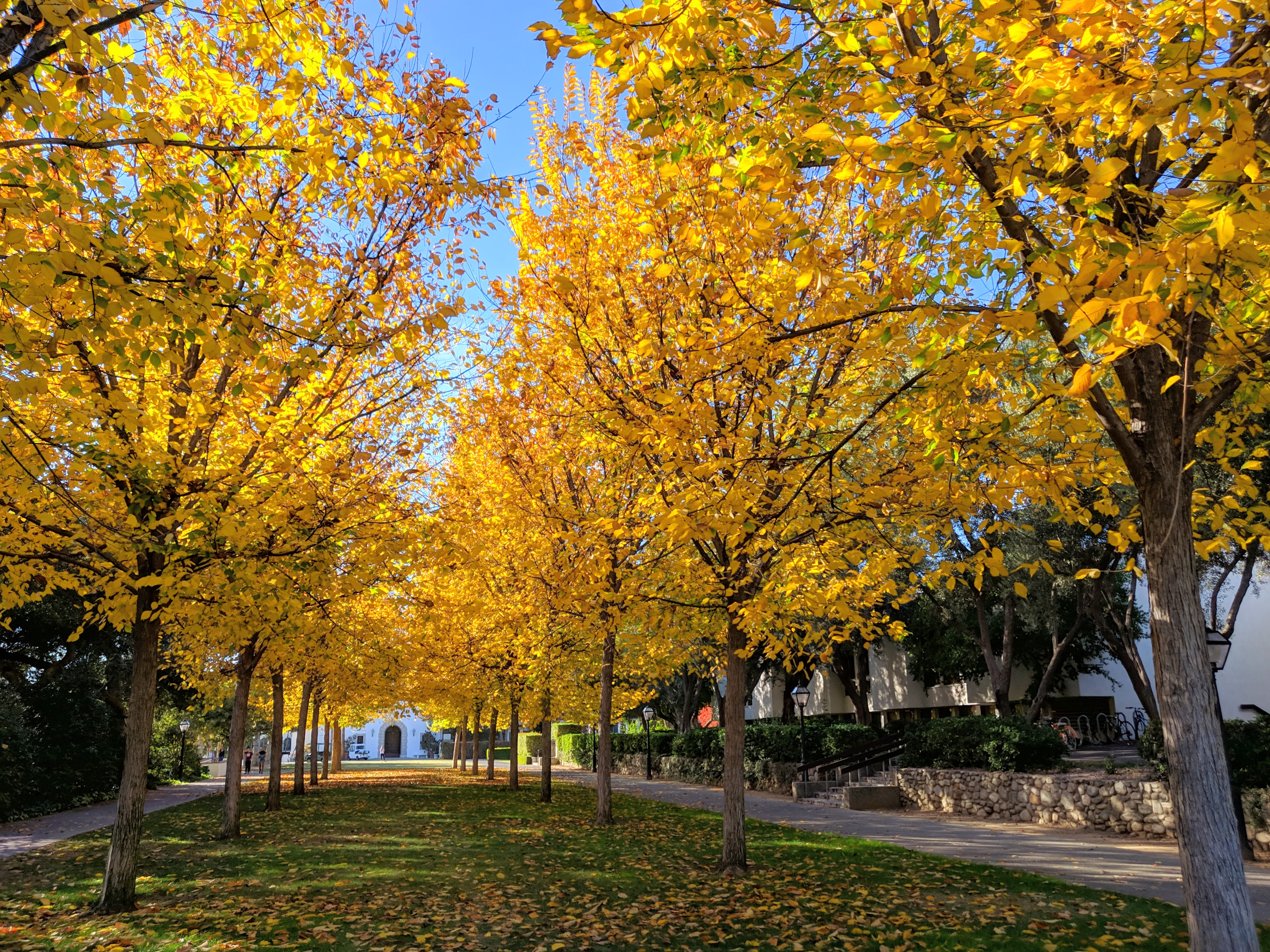
A row of Princeton elm trees, which are moderately resistant to Dutch elm disease, at Scripps College in Claremont, California.

Efforts to develop DED-resistant cultivars began in the Netherlands in 1928 and continued, uninterrupted by World War II, until 1992. Similar programmes were initiated in North America (1937), Italy (1978) and Spain (1986). Research has followed two paths:

=== Species and species cultivars ===
In North America, careful selection has produced a number of trees resistant not only to DED, but also to the droughts and cold winters that occur on the continent. Research in the United States has concentrated on the American elm (U. americana), resulting in the release of DED-resistant clones, notably the cultivars 'Valley Forge' and 'Jefferson'. Much work has also been done into the selection of disease-resistant Asiatic species and cultivars.

In 1993, Mariam B. Sticklen and Mark G. Bolyard reported the results of experiments funded by the US National Park Service and conducted at Michigan State University in East Lansing that were designed to apply genetic engineering techniques to the development of DED-resistant strains of American elm trees. In 2007, A. E. Newhouse and F. Schrodt of the State University of New York College of Environmental Science and Forestry in Syracuse reported that young transgenic American elm trees had shown reduced DED symptoms and normal mycorrhizal colonization.

In Europe, the European white elm (U. laevis) has received much attention. While this elm has little innate resistance to DED, it is not favoured by the vector bark beetles. Thus it becomes colonized and infected only when no other elms are available, a rare situation in western Europe. Research in Spain has suggested that it may be the presence of a triterpene, alnulin, which makes the tree bark unattractive to the beetle species that spread the disease. This possibility, though, has not been conclusively proven. More recently, field elms Ulmus minor highly resistant to DED have been discovered in Spain, and form the basis of a major breeding programme.

=== Hybrid cultivars ===
Owing to their innate resistance to DED, Asiatic species have been crossed with European species, or with other Asiatic elms, to produce trees that are both highly resistant to disease and tolerant of native climates. After a number of false dawns in the 1970s, this approach has produced a range of reliable hybrid cultivars now commercially available in North America and Europe. Disease resistance is invariably carried by the female parent.

Some of these cultivars, notably those with the Siberian elm (Ulmus pumila) in their ancestry, lack the forms for which the iconic American elm and English elm were prized. Moreover, several exported to northwestern Europe have proven unsuited to the maritime climate conditions there, notably because of their intolerance of anoxic conditions resulting from ponding on poorly drained soils in winter. Dutch hybridizations invariably included the Himalayan elm (Ulmus wallichiana) as a source of antifungal genes and have proven more tolerant of wet ground; they should also ultimately reach a greater size. However, the susceptibility of the cultivar 'Lobel', used as a control in Italian trials, to elm yellows has now (2014) raised a question mark over all the Dutch clones.

Several highly resistant Ulmus cultivars have been released since 2000 by the Institute of Plant Protection in Florence, most commonly featuring crosses of the Dutch cultivar 'Plantijn' with the Siberian elm to produce resistant trees better adapted to the Mediterranean climate.

==== Cautions regarding novel cultivars ====
Elms take many decades to grow to maturity, and as the introduction of these disease-resistant cultivars is relatively recent, their long-term performance and ultimate size and form cannot be predicted with certainty. The National Elm Trial in North America, begun in 2005, is a nationwide trial to assess strengths and weaknesses of the 19 leading cultivars raised in the US over a 10-year period; European cultivars have been excluded. Meanwhile, in Europe, American and European cultivars are being assessed in field trials started in 2000 by the UK charity Butterfly Conservation.

=== Landscaped parks ===
==== Central Park ====
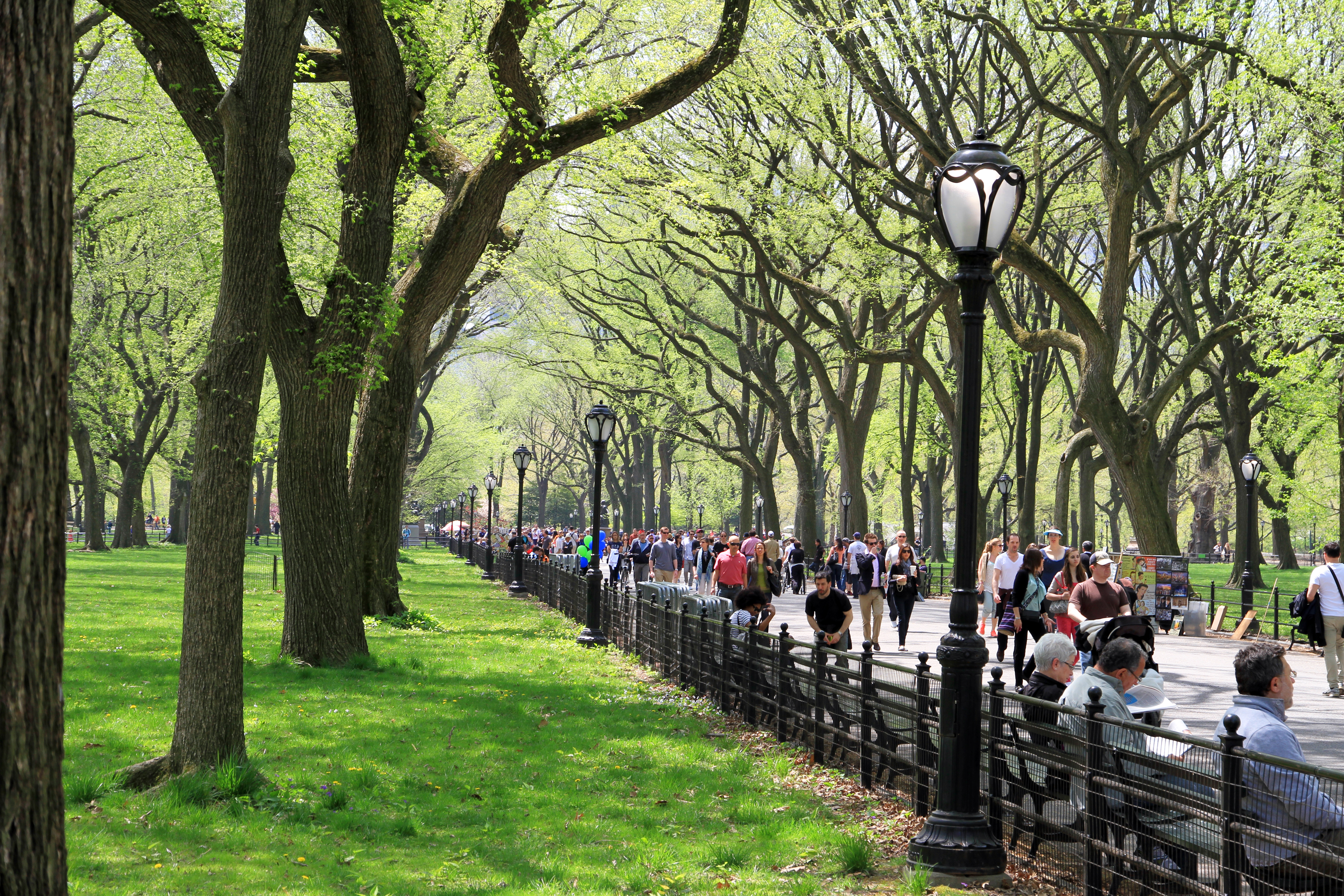
American elm trees along the Mall and Literary Walk in New York City's Central Park (2013)

The oldest American elm trees in New York City's Central Park were planted in the 1860s by Frederick Law Olmsted, making them among the oldest stands of American elms in the world. Along the Mall and Literary Walk four lines of American elms stretch over the walkway forming a cathedral-like covering. A part of New York City's urban ecology, the elms improve air and water quality, reduce erosion and flooding, and decrease air temperatures during warm days.

While the stand is still vulnerable to DED, in the 1980s the Central Park Conservancy undertook aggressive countermeasures such as heavy pruning and removal of extensively diseased trees. These efforts have largely been successful in saving the majority of the trees, although several are still lost each year. Younger American elms that have been planted in Central Park since the outbreak are of the DED-resistant 'Princeton' and 'Valley Forge' cultivars.

==== National Mall ====
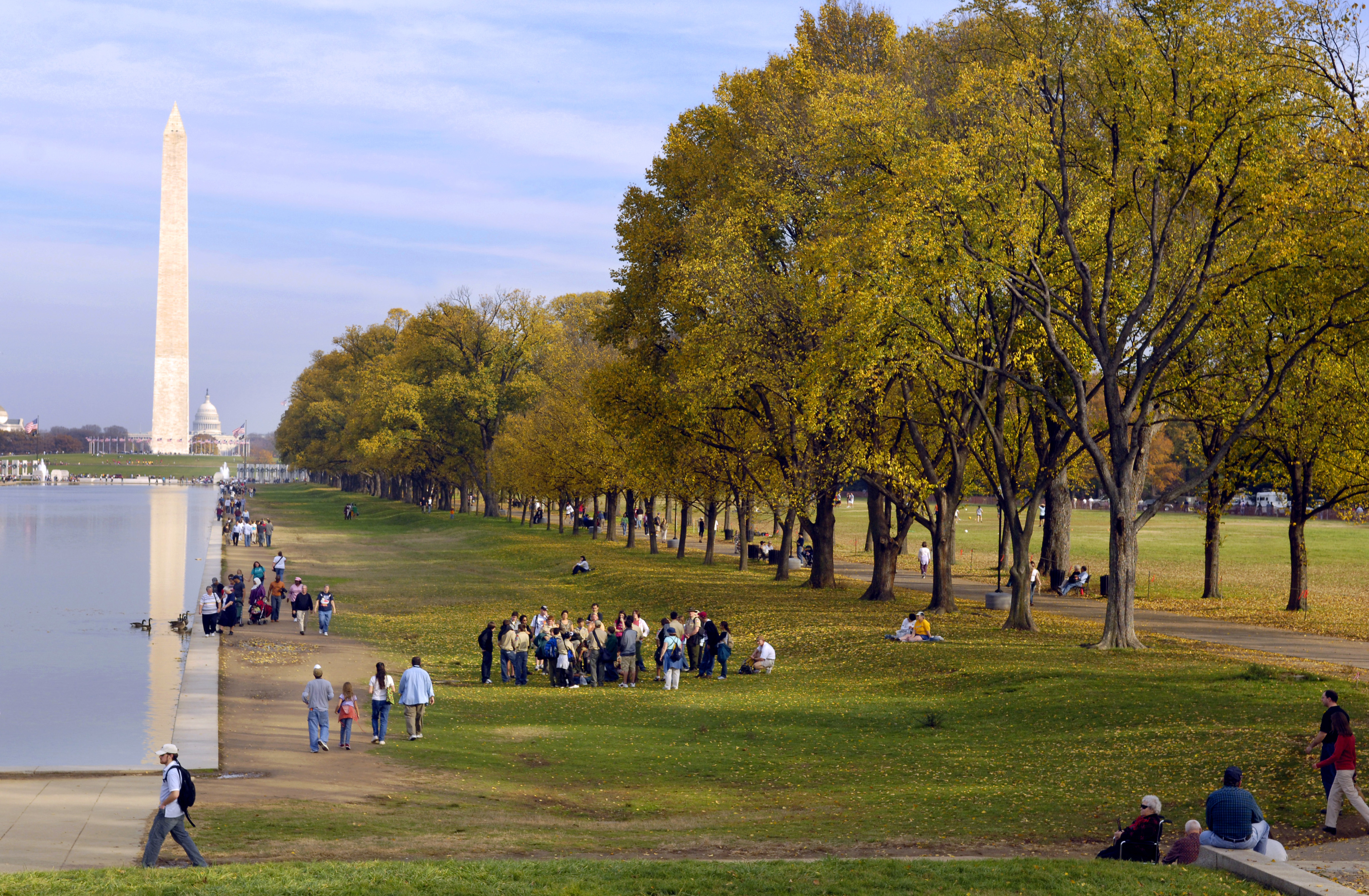
Rows of American elm trees line a path south of the Lincoln Memorial Reflecting Pool on the National Mall in Washington, DC (November 11, 2006)

Several rows of American elm trees that the National Park Service (NPS) first planted during the 1930s line much of the 1.9-mile-length (3.1-kilometer) of the National Mall in Washington, DC. DED first appeared on the trees during the 1950s and reached a peak in the 1970s. The NPS used a number of methods to control the epidemic, including sanitation, pruning, injecting trees with fungicide, and replanting with DED-resistant cultivars. The NPS combated the disease's local insect vector, the smaller European elm bark beetle (Scolytus multistriatus), by trapping and by spraying with insecticides. As a result, the population of American elms planted on the Mall and its surrounding areas has remained intact for more than 80 years.

== Uses ==
=== Wood ===
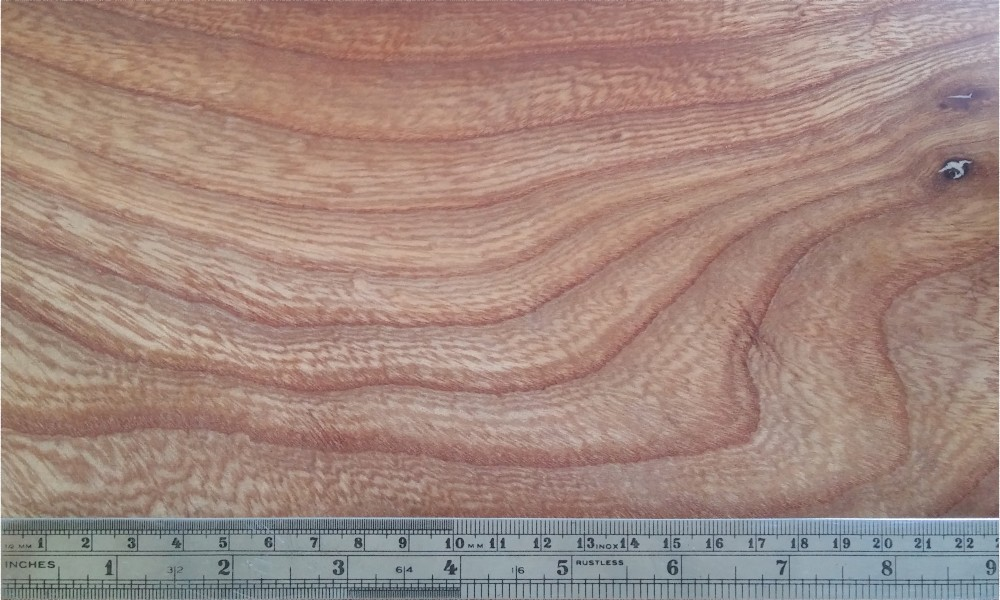
Elm wood

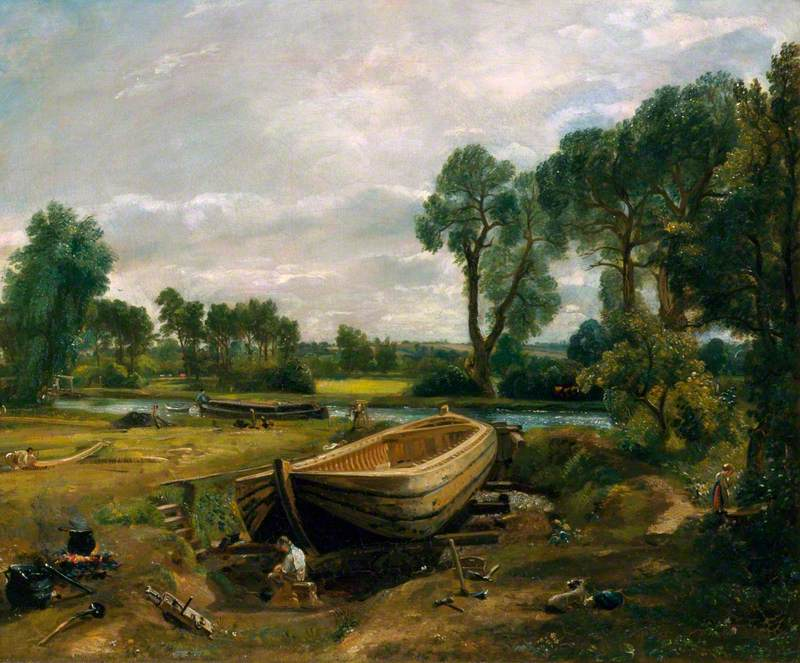
Elm in boatbuilding: John Constable, Boat-Building Near Flatford Mill, 1815 (landscape with hybrid elms Ulmus × hollandica)

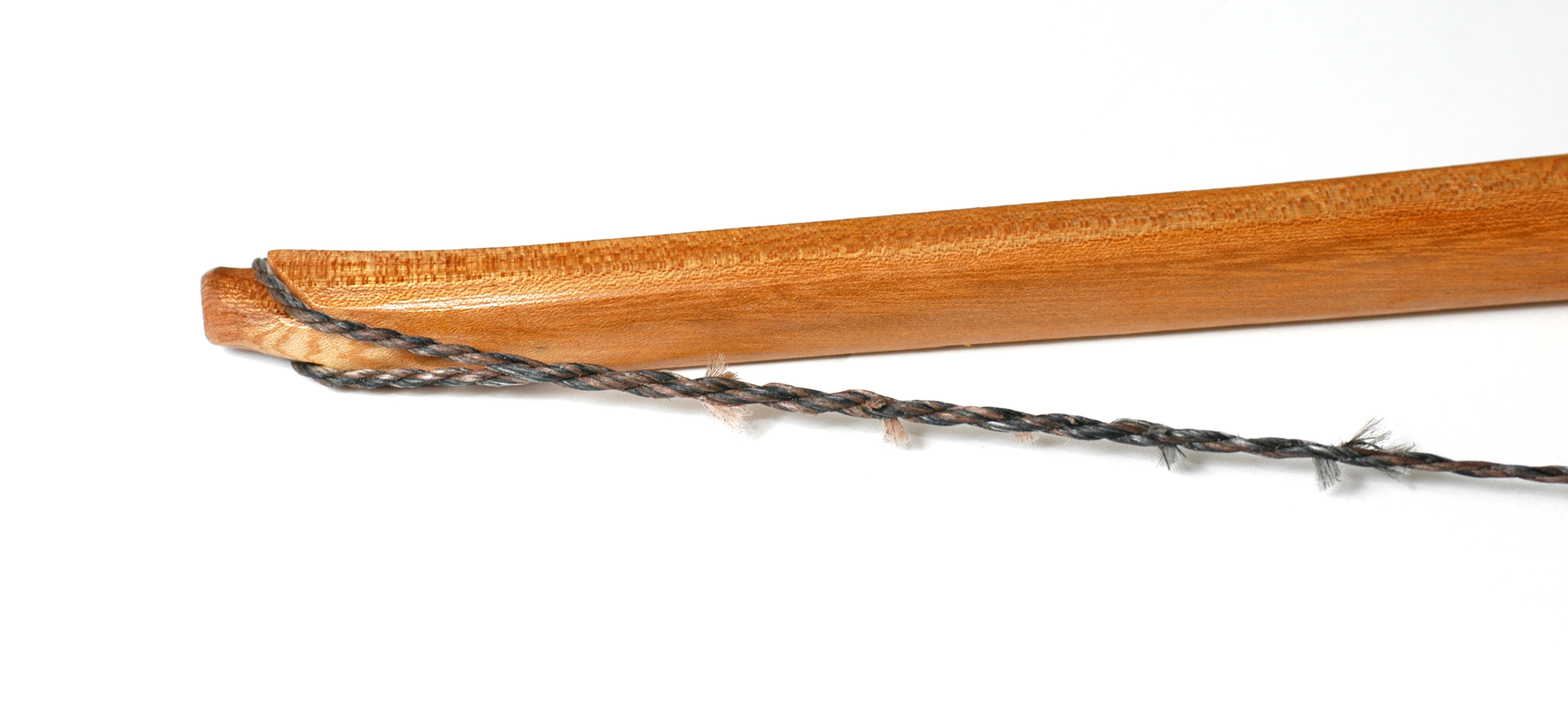
English longbow of elm

Elm wood is valued for its interlocking grain, and consequent resistance to splitting, with significant uses in wagon-wheel hubs, chair seats, and coffins. The bodies of Japanese Taiko drums are often cut from the wood of old elm trees, as the wood's resistance to splitting is highly desired for nailing the skins to them, and a set of three or more is often cut from the same tree. The elm's wood bends well and distorts easily. The often long, straight trunks were favoured as a source of timber for keels in ship construction. Elm is also prized by bowyers; of the ancient bows found in Europe, a large portion are elm. During the Middle Ages, elm was also used to make longbows if yew was unavailable.

The first written references to elm occur in the Linear B lists of military equipment at Knossos in the Mycenaean period. Several of the chariots are of elm ("πτε-ρε-ϝα", pte-re-wa), and the lists twice mention wheels of elmwood. Hesiod says that ploughs in Ancient Greece were also made partly of elm.

The density of elm wood varies between species, but averages around 560 kg/m^{3}.

Elm wood is also resistant to decay when permanently wet, and hollowed trunks were widely used as water pipes during the medieval period in Europe. Elm was also used as piers in the construction of the original London Bridge, but this resistance to decay in water does not extend to ground contact.

=== Viticulture ===
The Romans and, more recently Italians, planted elms in vineyards as supports for vines. Lopped at 3 m, the elms' quick growth, twiggy lateral branches, light shade, and root suckering made them ideal trees for this purpose. The lopped branches were used for fodder and firewood. Ovid in his Amores characterizes the elm as "loving the vine": ulmus amat vitem, vitis non deserit ulmum (the elm loves the vine, the vine does not desert the elm), and the ancients spoke of the "marriage" between elm and vine.

=== Medicinal products ===
The mucilaginous inner bark of the slippery elm (Ulmus rubra) has long been used as a demulcent, and is still produced commercially for this purpose in the US with approval for sale as a nutritional supplement by the Food and Drug Administration.

=== Fodder ===
Elms also have a long history of cultivation for fodder, with the leafy branches cut to feed livestock. The practice continues today in the Himalaya, where it contributes to serious deforestation.

=== Biomass ===
As fossil fuel resources diminish, increasing attention is being paid to trees as sources of energy. In Italy, the Istituto per la Protezione delle Piante is (2012) in the process of releasing to commerce very fast-growing elm cultivars, able to increase in height by more than 2 metres (6.6 feet) per year.

=== Food ===
Elm bark, cut into strips and boiled, sustained much of the rural population of Norway during the great famine of 1812. The seeds are particularly nutritious, containing 45% crude protein, and less than 7% fibre by dry mass.

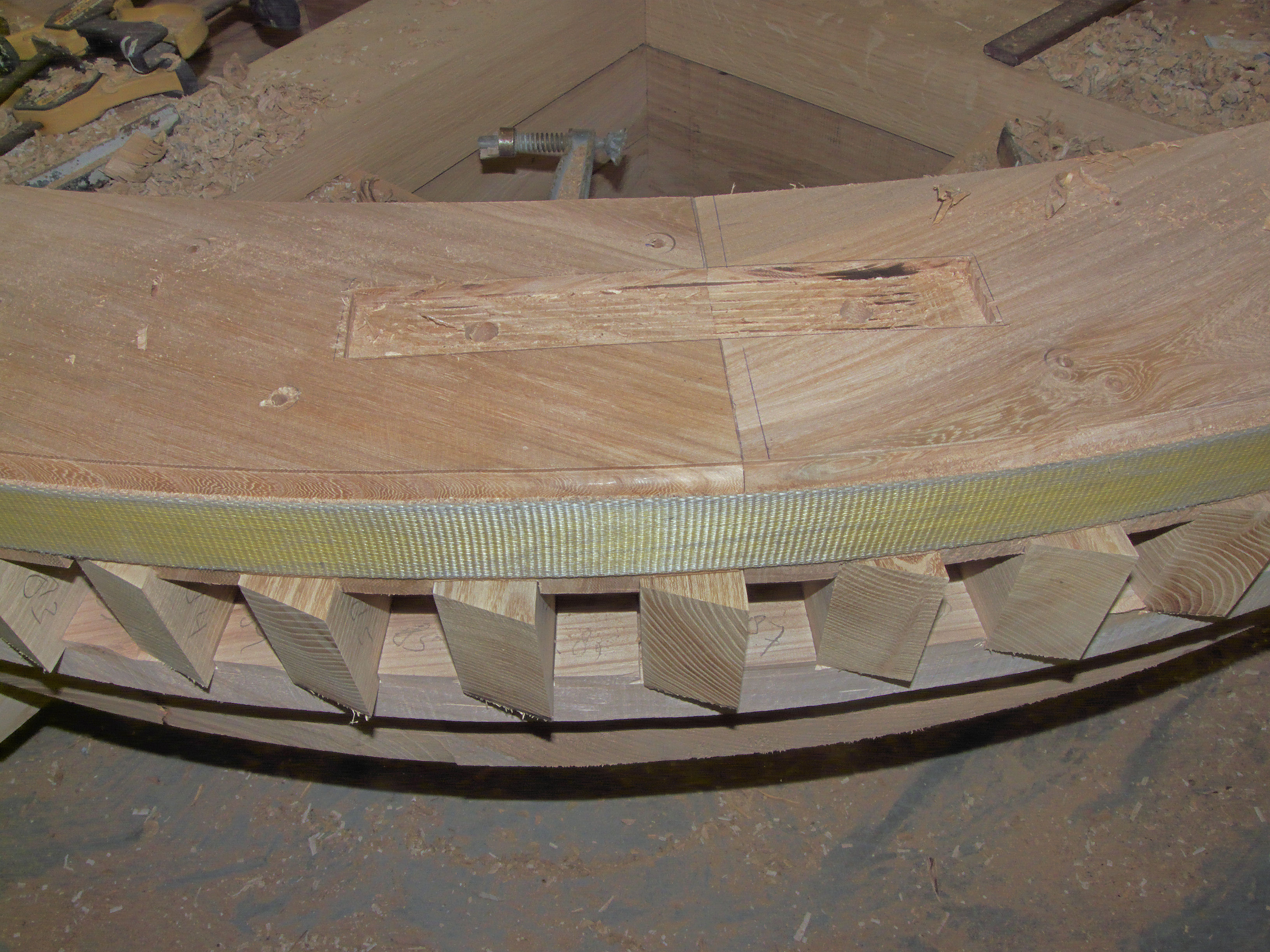
Internal mill-wheel of elm, De Hoop mill, Oldebroek, Netherlands

=== Alternative medicine ===
Elm has been listed as one of the 38 substances that are used to prepare Bach flower remedies, a kind of alternative medicine.

=== Bonsai ===
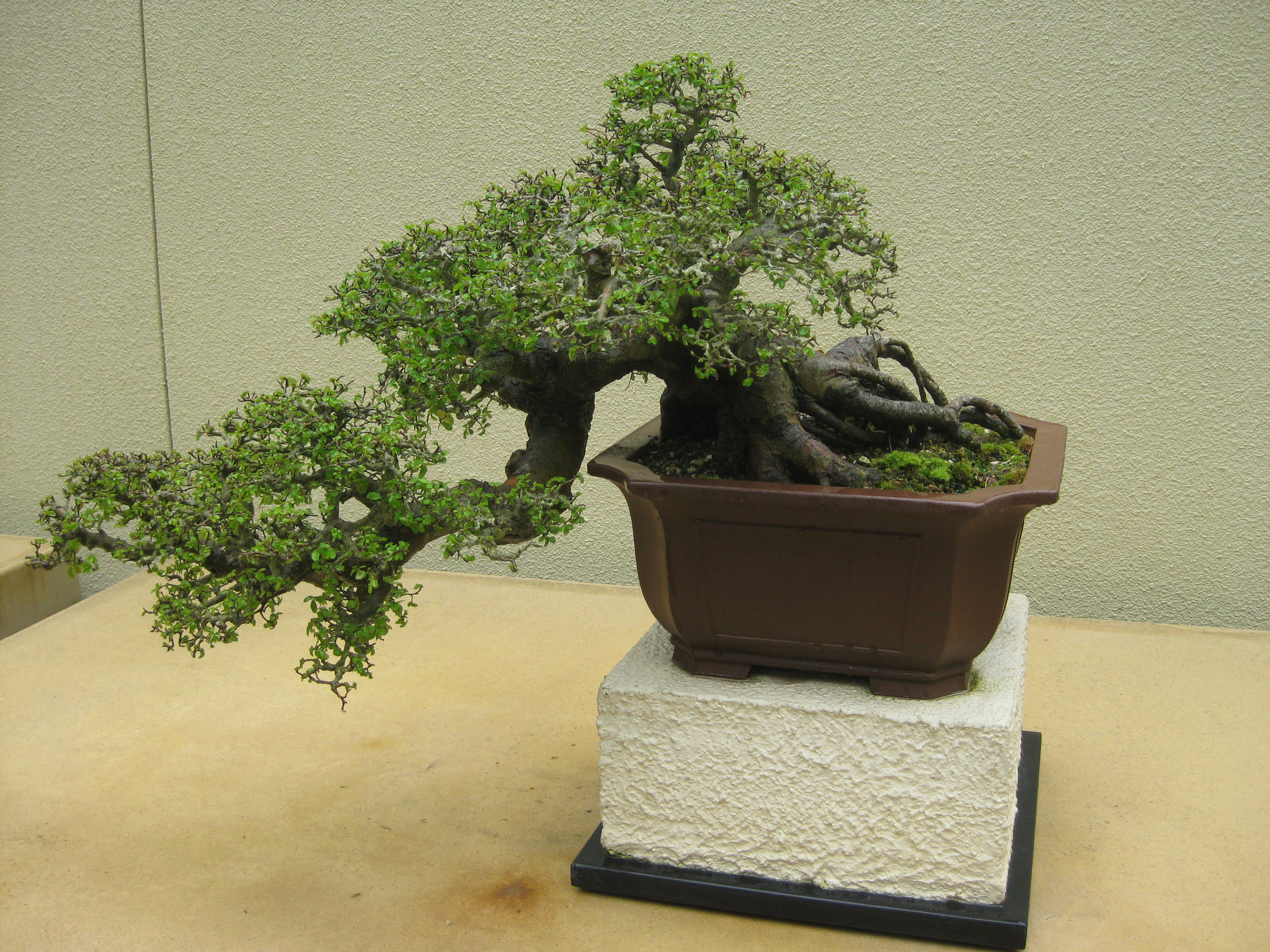
Chinese elm Ulmus parvifolia bonsai

Chinese elm (Ulmus parvifolia) is a popular choice for bonsai owing to its tolerance of severe pruning.

=== Mesolithic farming practices ===
In Ireland, semi-nomadic mesolithic farmers would search for stands of elm trees to identify nearby areas of fertile soil, as elm trees would only grow around good arable land. These practices would have originated around 4,000 BC, when groups of people began coming into Ireland from the east. Given the limited stone tools at the time, they likely cleared trees with girdling to grow cereals or support livestock. They would move on to another area when the fertility of the soil declined. Some academics have criticised this theory, suggesting instead that Irish mesolithic elm decline was due to disease, which coincidentally opened up land for the farmers.

== Genetic resource conservation ==
In 1997, a European Union elm project was initiated, its aim to coordinate the conservation of all the elm genetic resources of the member states and, among other things, to assess their resistance to Dutch elm disease. Accordingly, over 300 clones were selected and propagated for testing.

== Culture ==
=== Notable elm trees ===
Many elm trees of various kinds have attained great size or otherwise become particularly noteworthy.

=== In art ===
Many artists have admired elms for the ease and grace of their branching and foliage, and have painted them with sensitivity. Elms are a recurring element in the landscapes and studies of, for example, John Constable, Ferdinand Georg Waldmüller, Alfred East, George Clausen, Frederick Childe Hassam, Karel Klinkenberg, and George Inness.

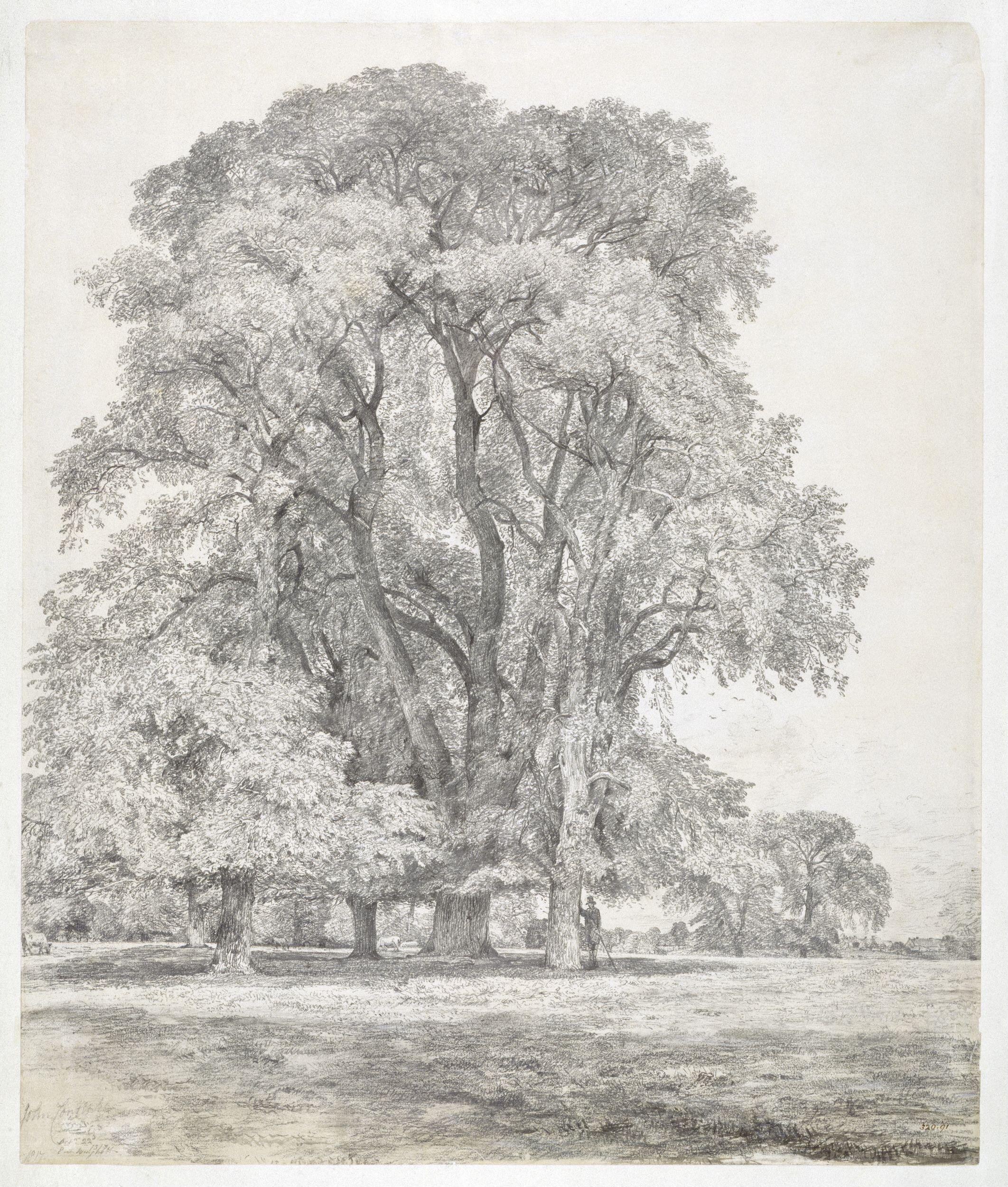
John Constable, Elm trees in Old Hall Park, East Bergholt [1817] (Ulmus × hollandica)

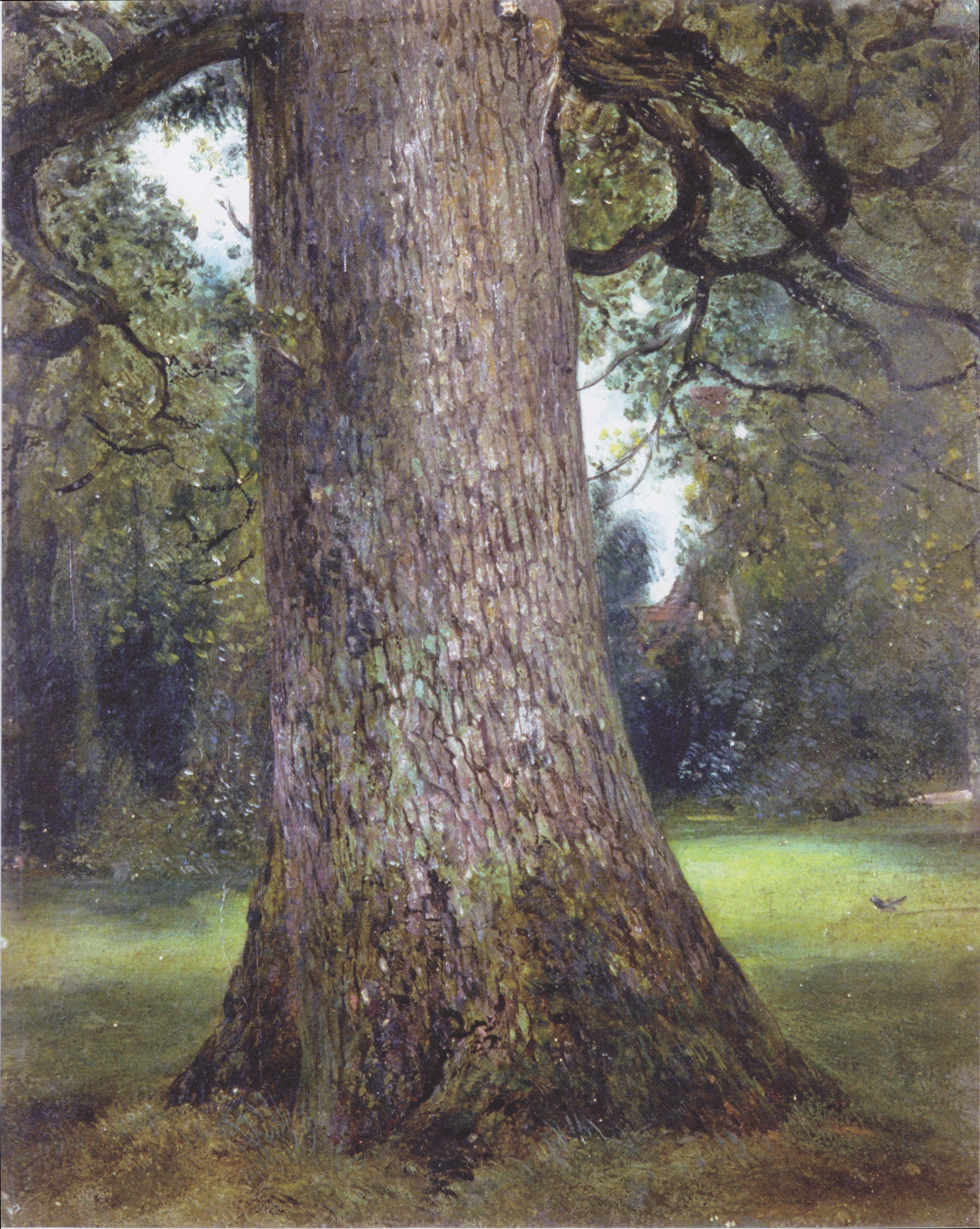
John Constable, Study of an Elm Tree [1821]

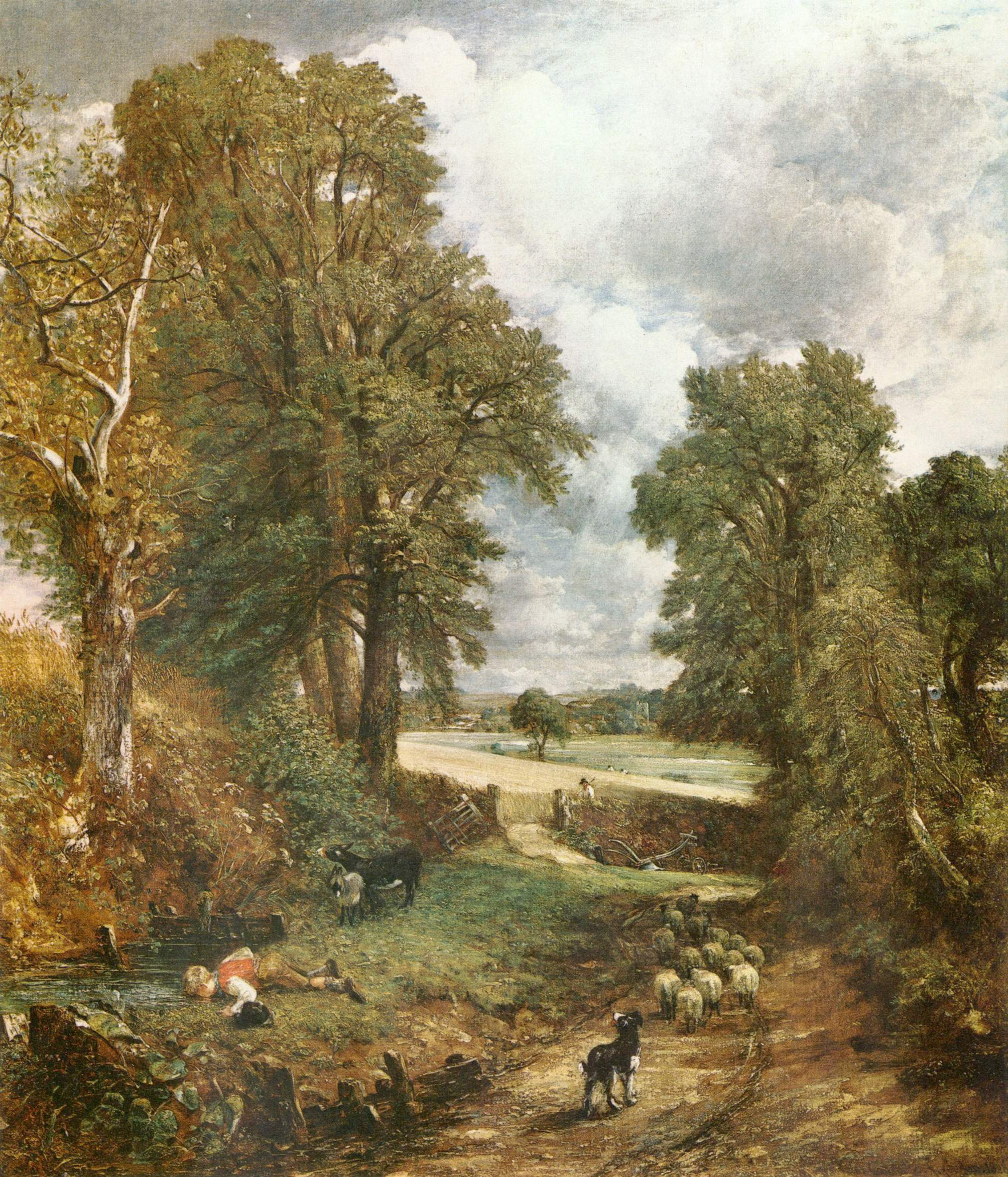
John Constable, The Cornfield [1826] (Ulmus × hollandica)

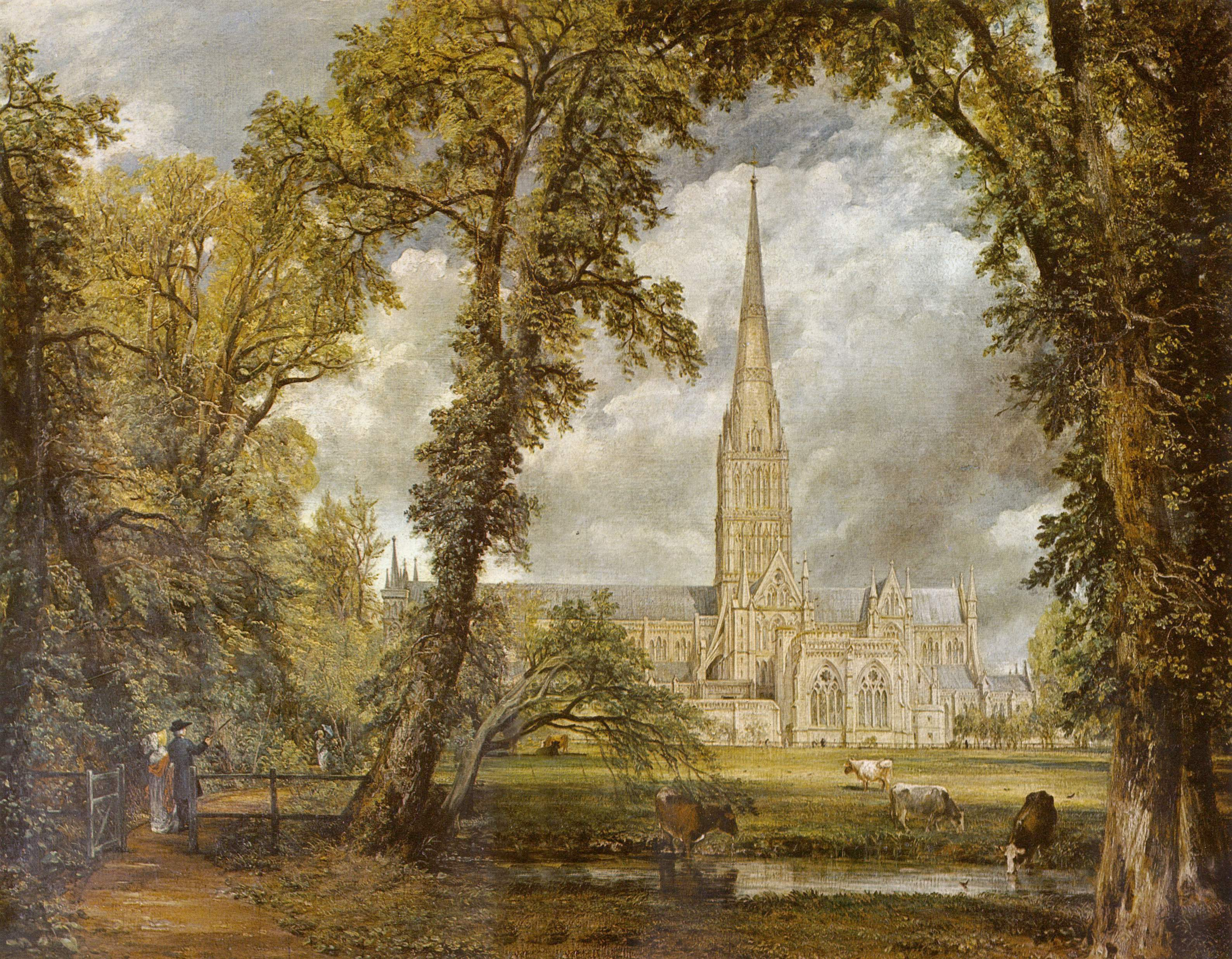
Constable, Salisbury Cathedral from the Bishop's Garden [1823 version] (Ulmus × hollandica)

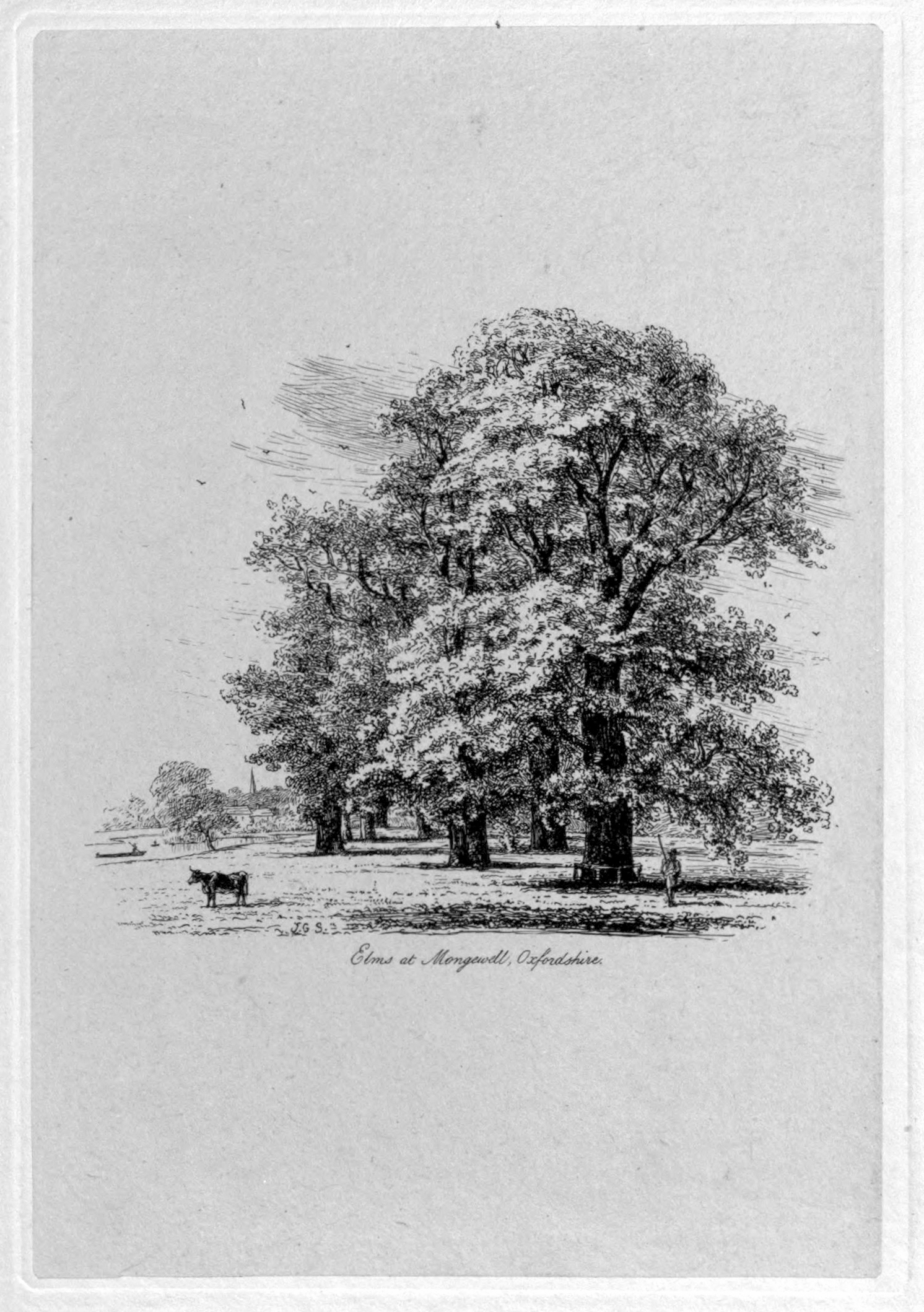
Jacob George Strutt, Elms at Mongewell, Oxfordshire [1830] (U. minor 'Atinia')

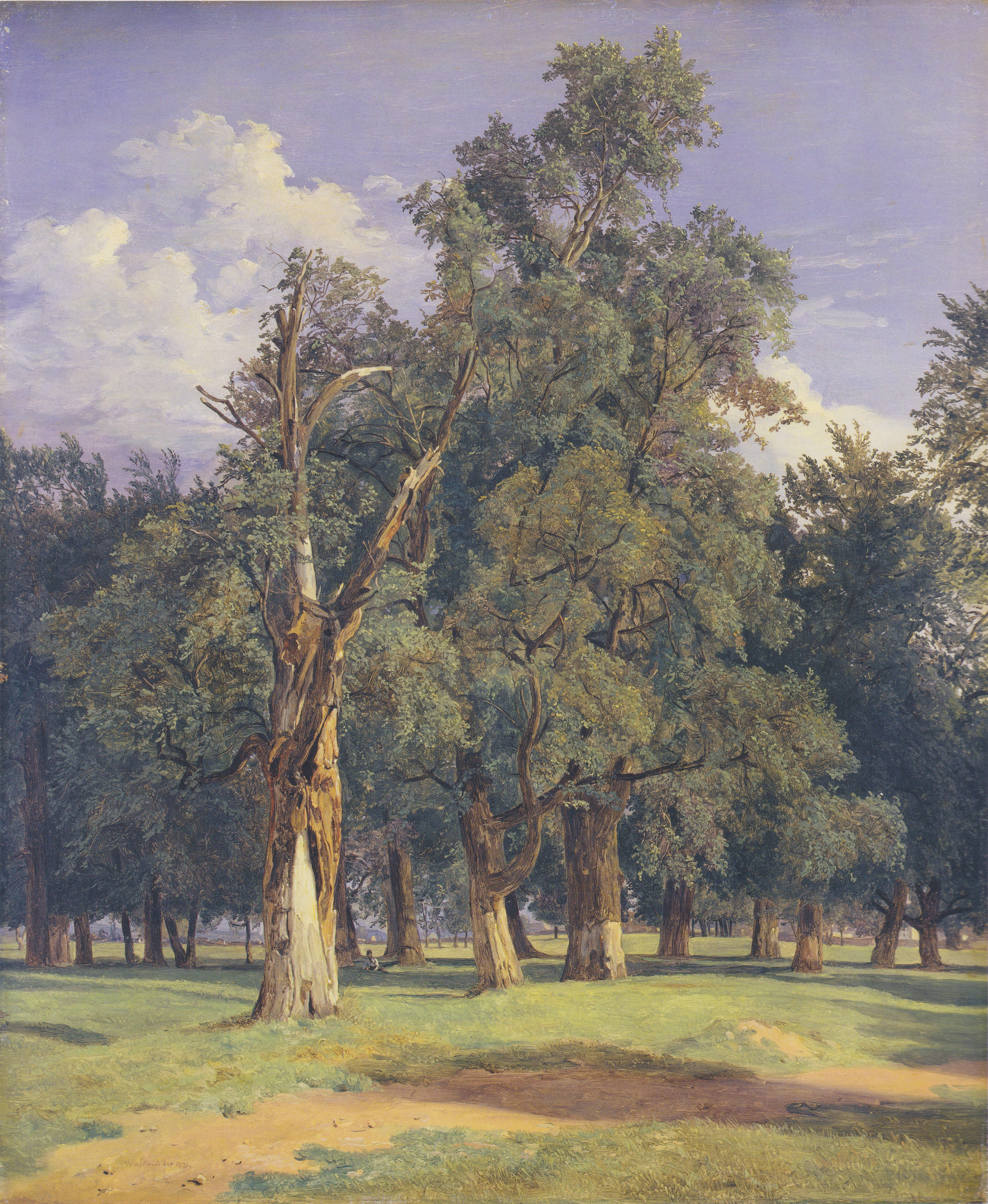
Ferdinand Georg Waldmüller, Alte Ulmen im Prater (Old Elms in Prater) [1831]

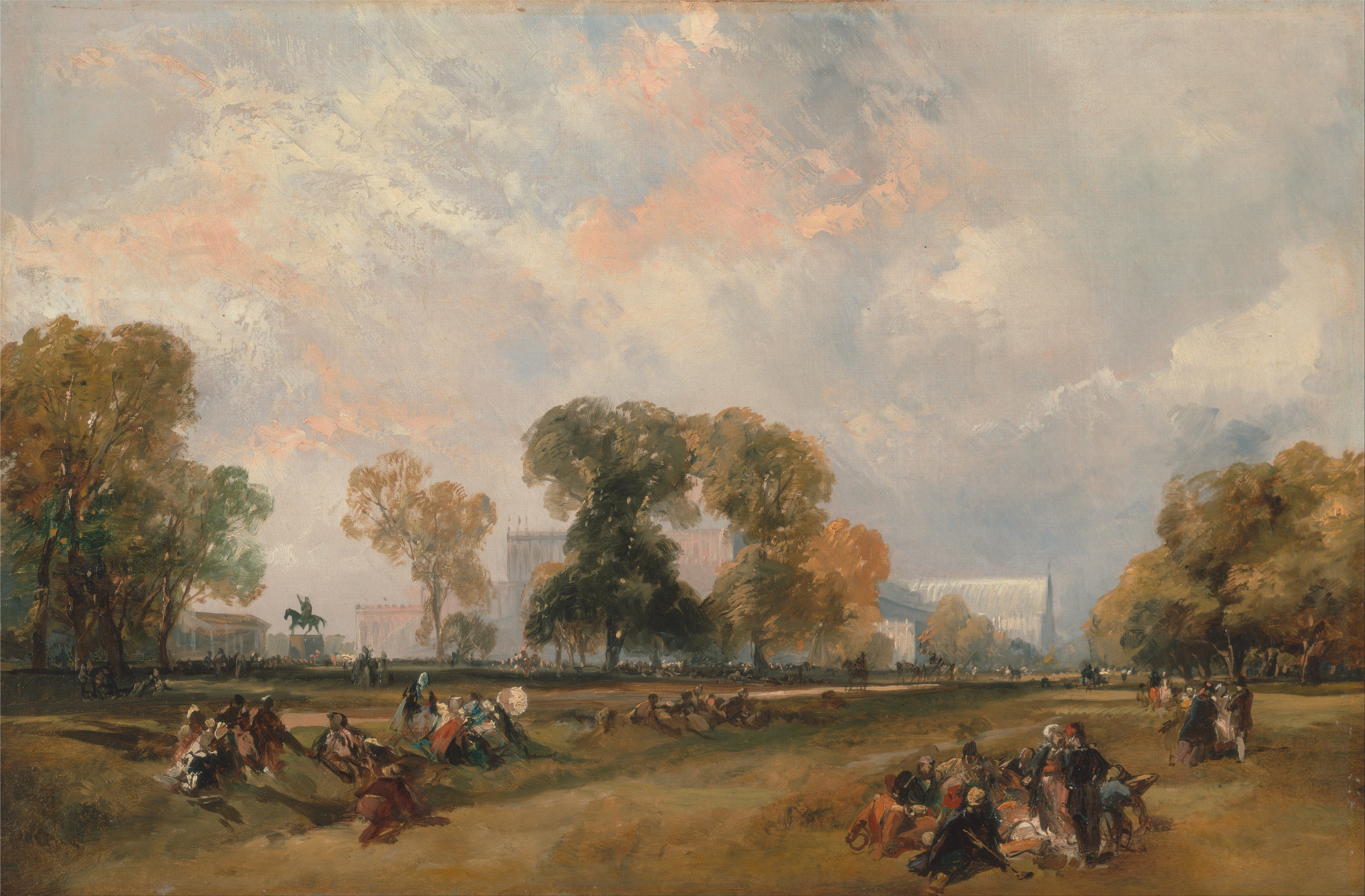
James Duffield Harding, The Great Exhibition of 1851 (U. minor 'Atinia', centre)

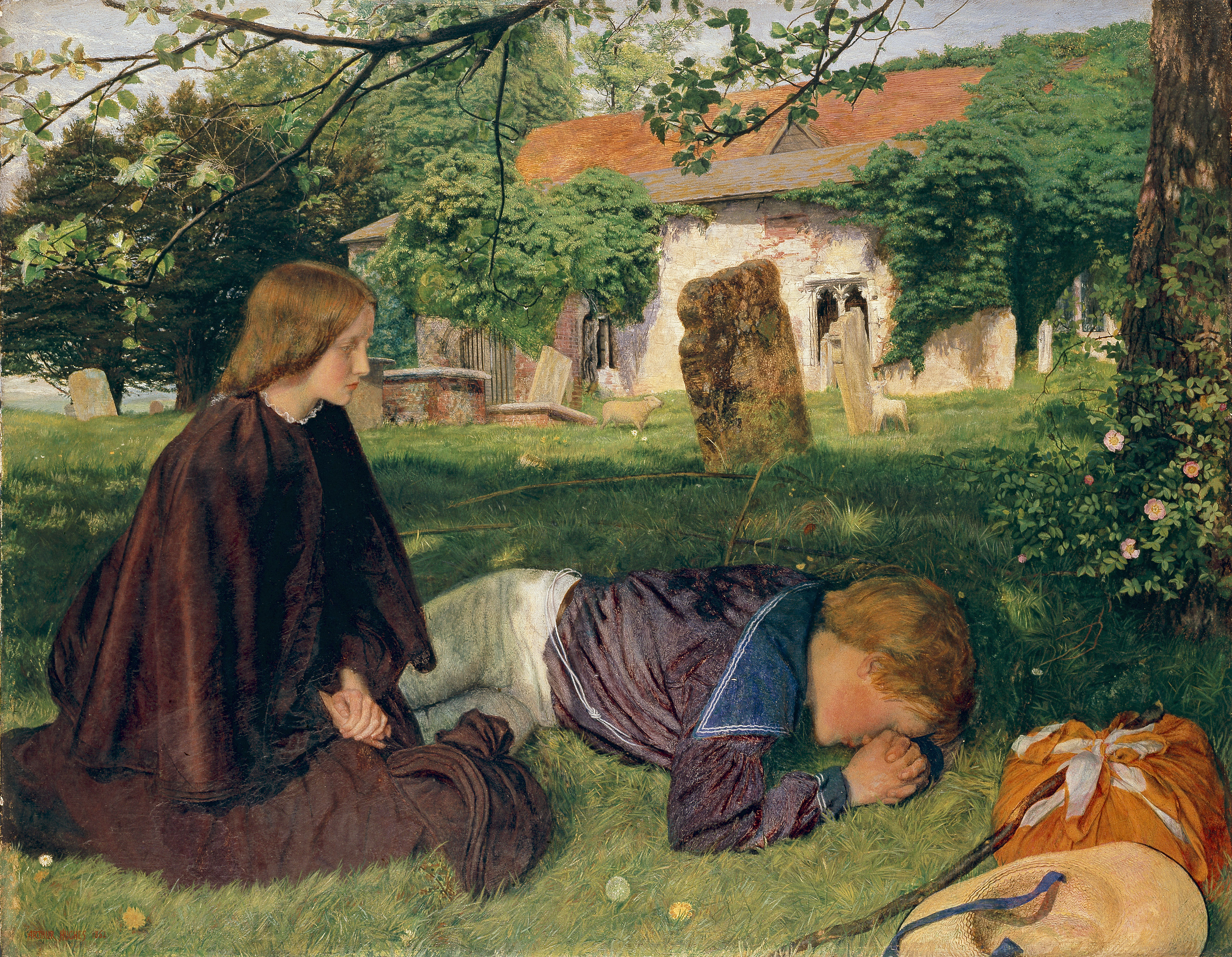
Arthur Hughes, Home from Sea [1862] (U. minor 'Atinia')

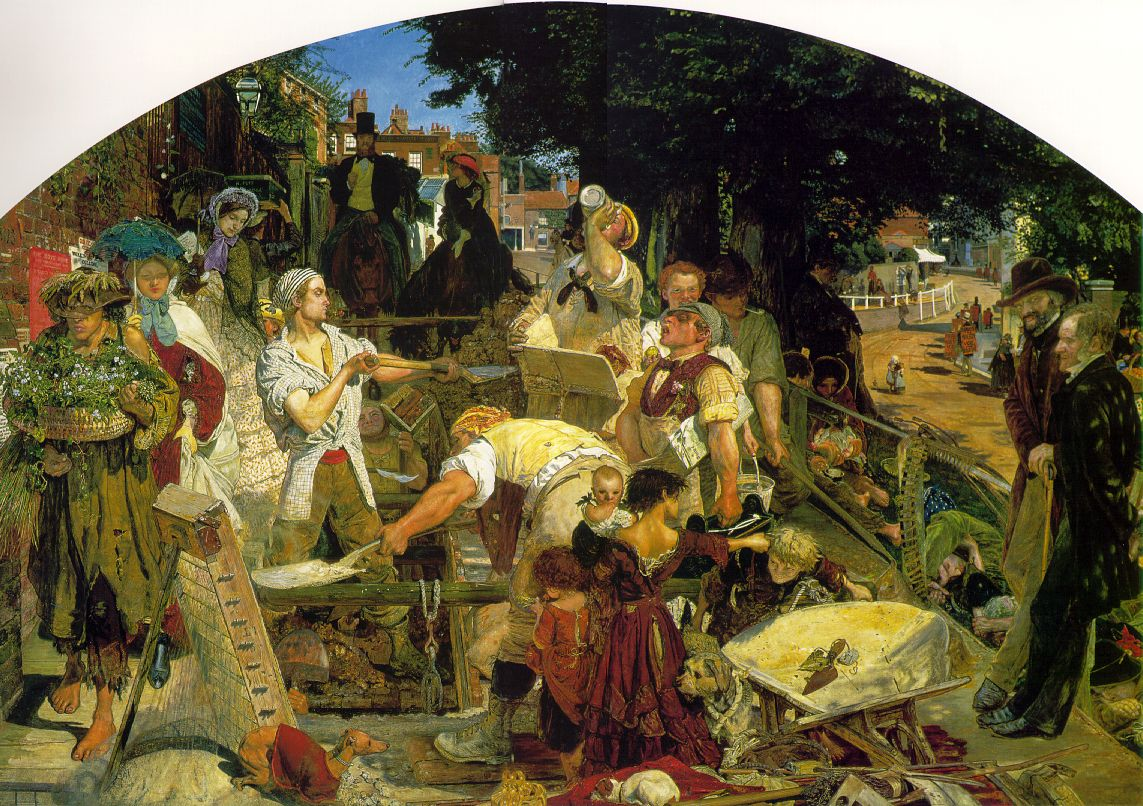
Ford Madox Brown, Work [1863] (U. minor 'Atinia')

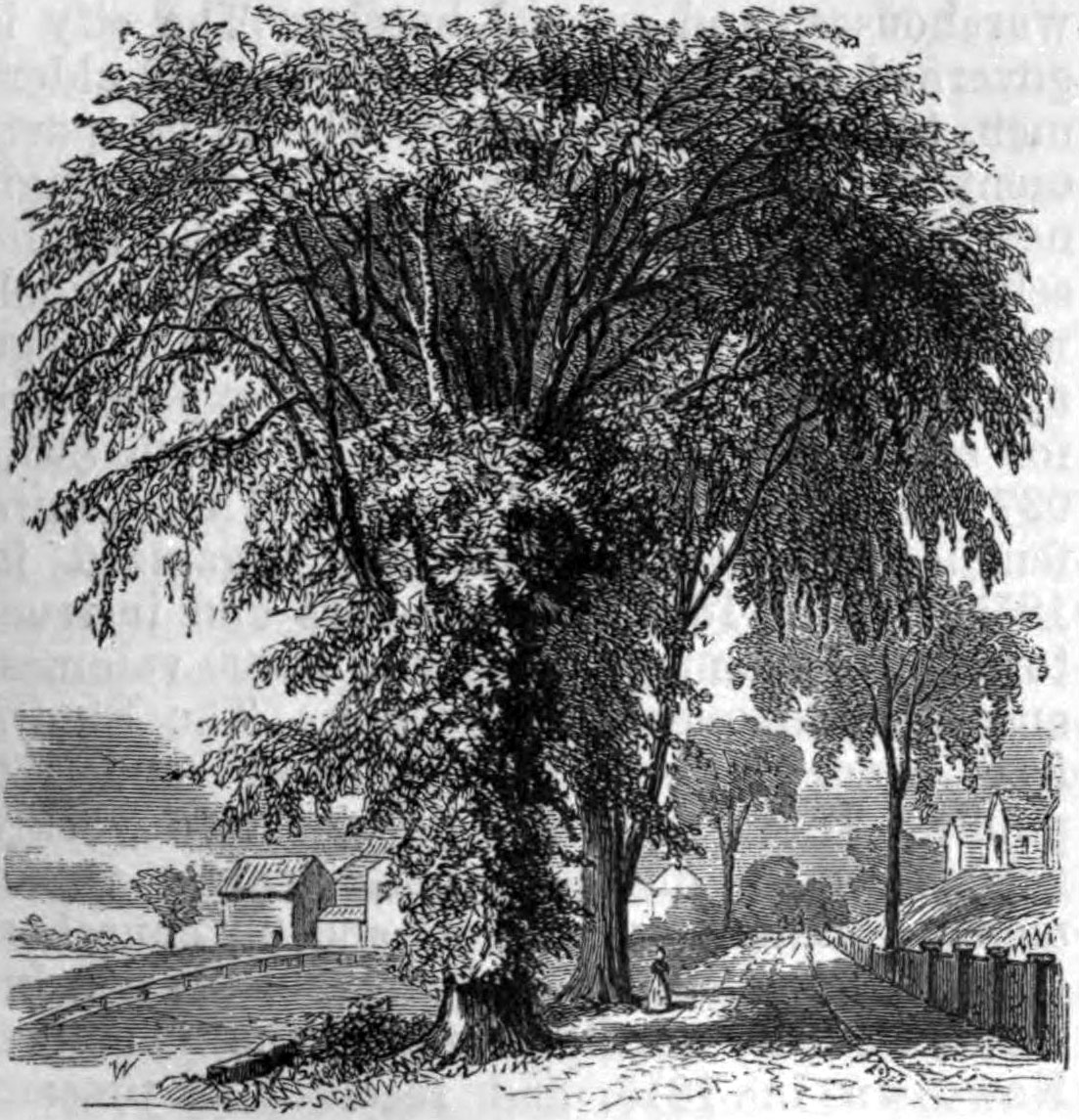
[unknown artist] The American Elm [1879] (U. americana)

Vincent van Gogh, Road Menders at Saint-Rémy [1889], old elms miscalled planes by the artist

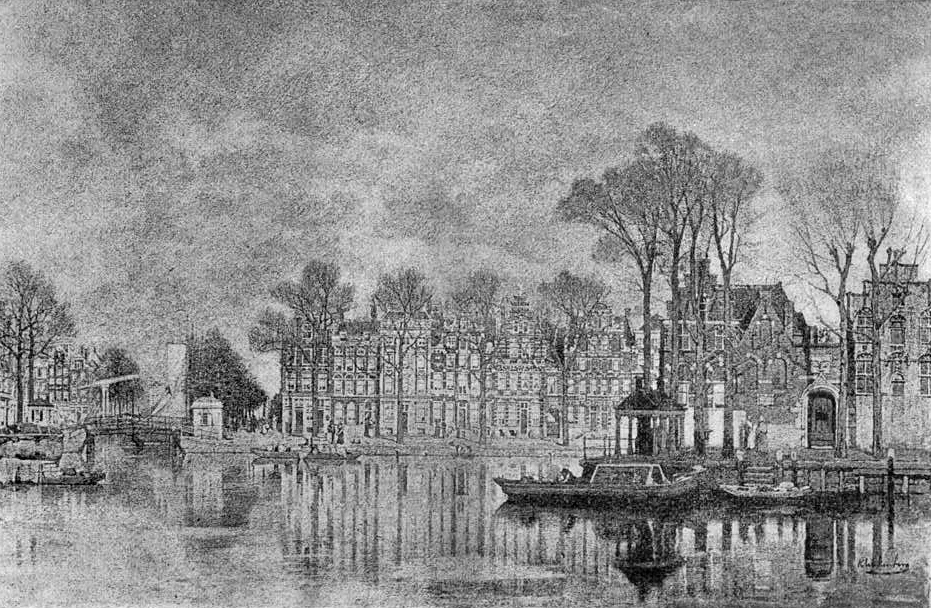
Johannes Karel Christiaan Klinkenberg, Amsterdam [1890] (Ulmus x hollandica ‘Belgica' )

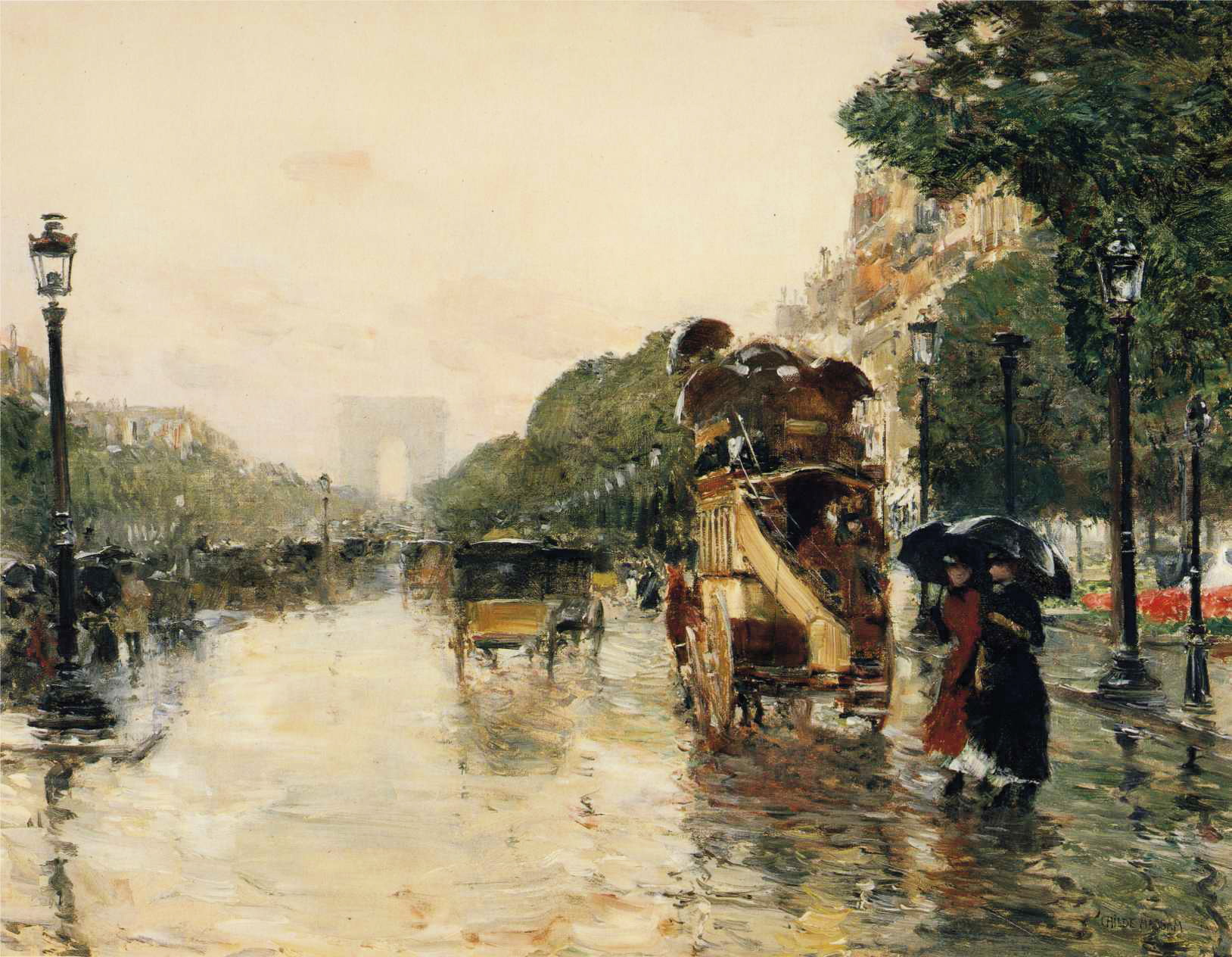
Frederick Childe Hassam, Champs Elysées, Paris [1889] (Ulmus × hollandica, 'orme femelle')

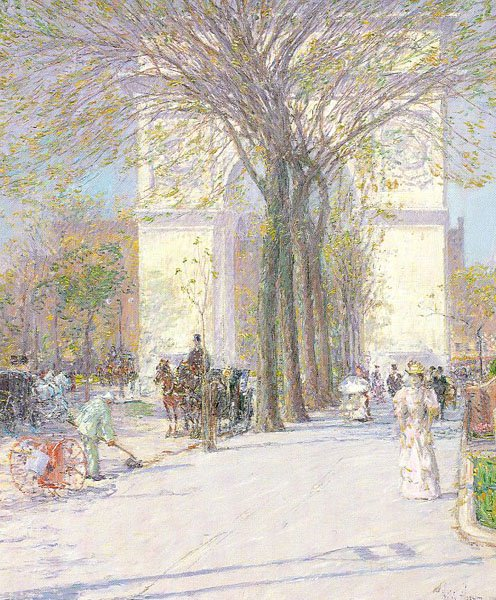
Frederick Childe Hassam, Washington Arch, Spring [1893] (U. americana)

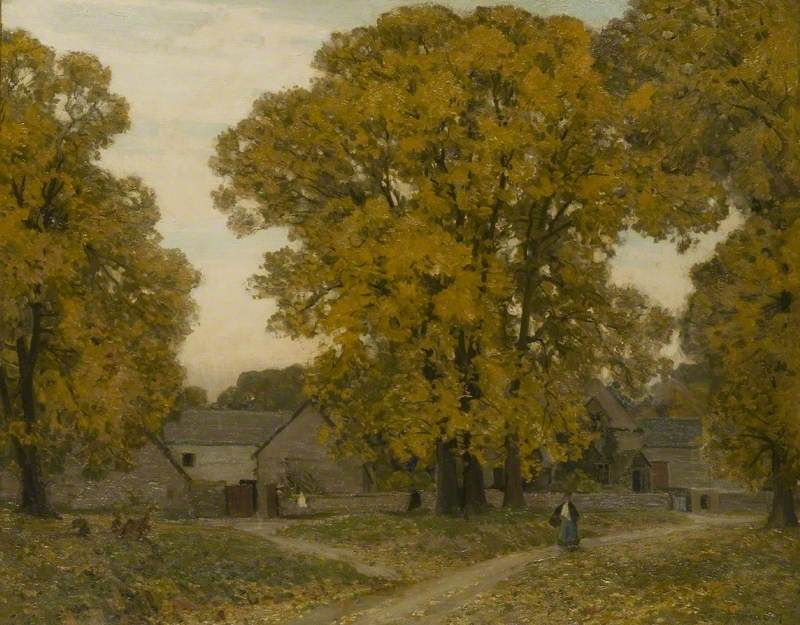
Alfred East, 'Autumn in Gloucestershire' [c.1900] (U. minor in Upper Swell)

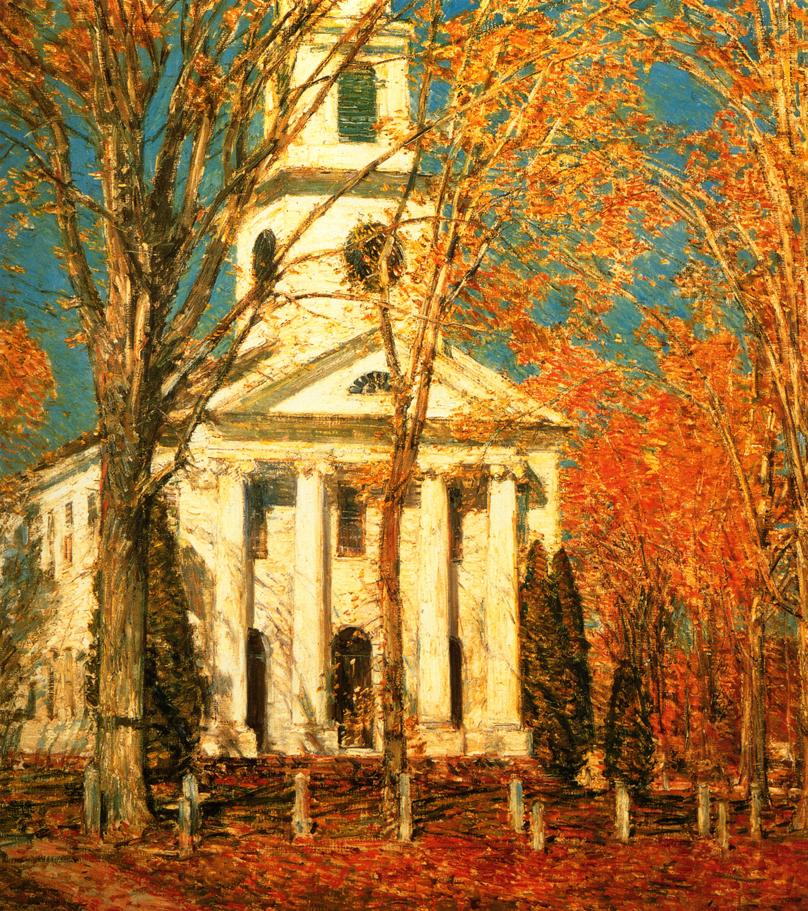
Frederick Childe Hassam, Church at Old Lyme [1905] (U. americana)

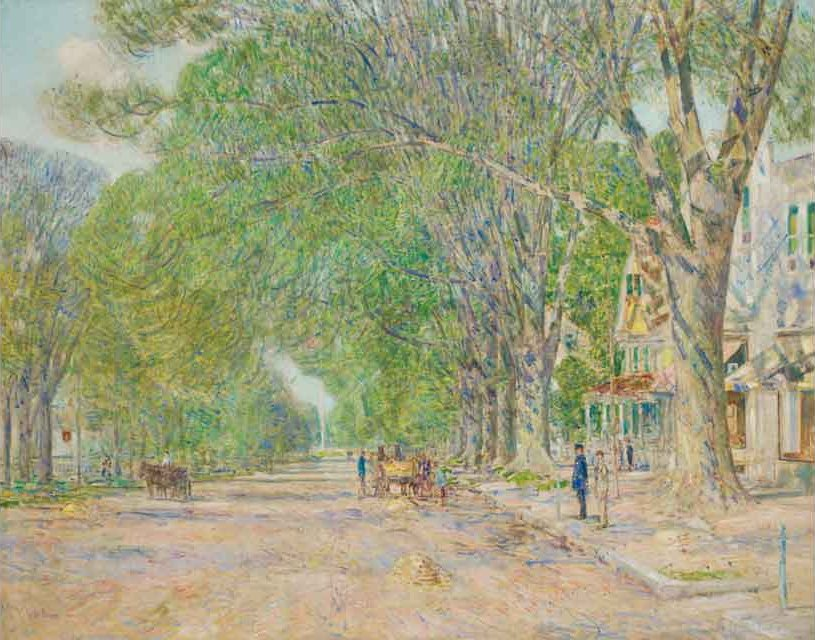
Frederick Childe Hassam, The East Hampton Elms in May [1920] (U. americana)

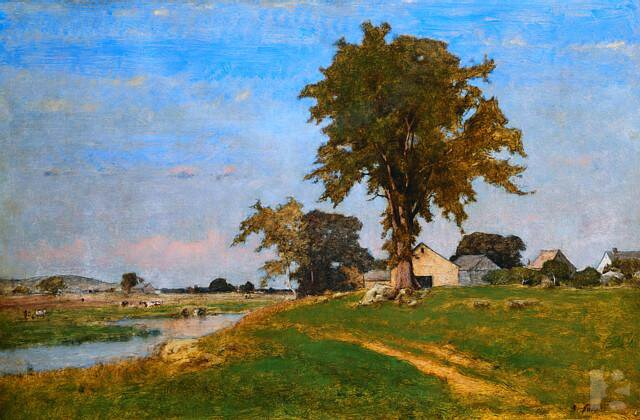
George Inness, Old Elm at Medfield (U. americana)

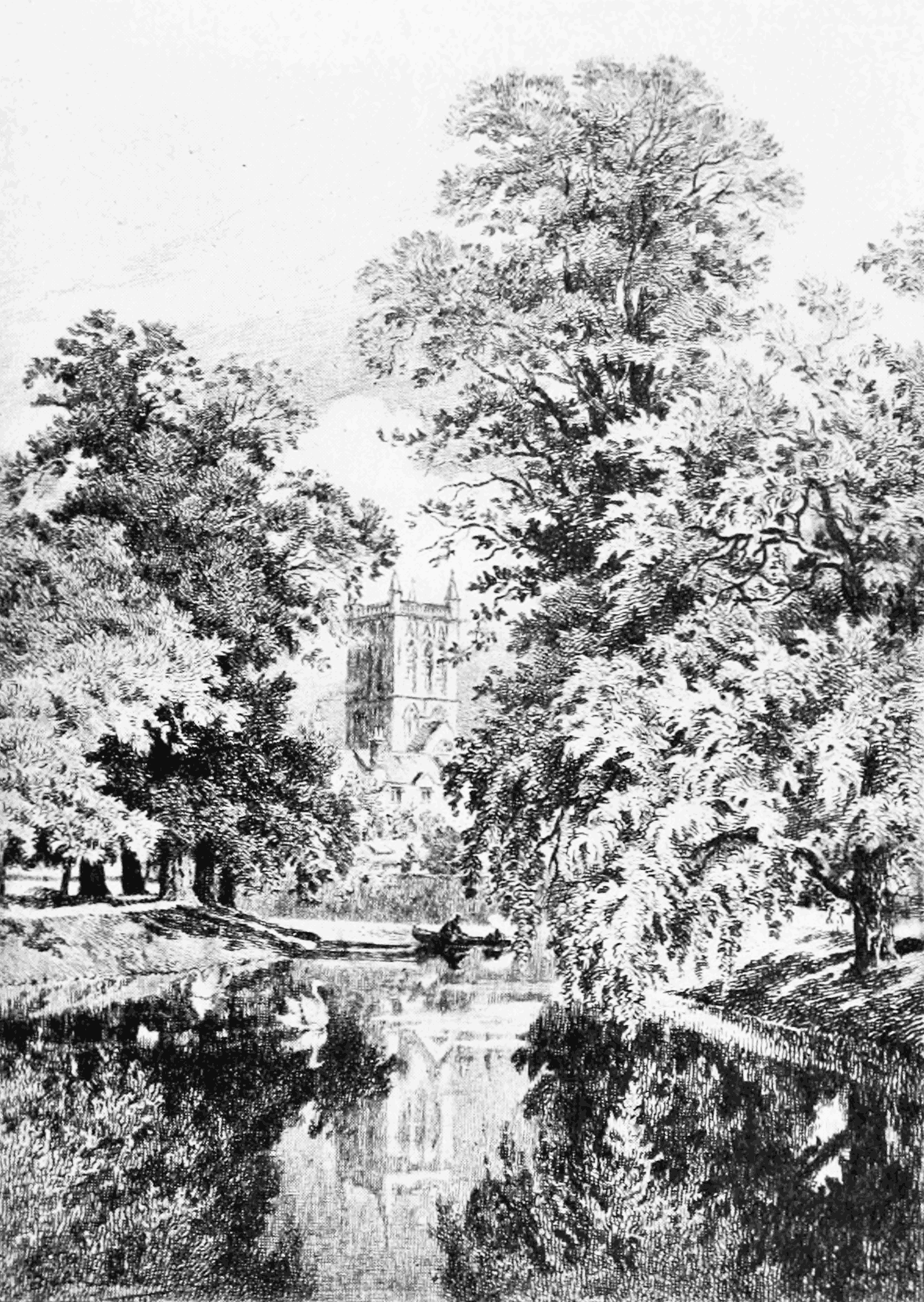
Unknown artist, The Cam near Trinity College, Cambridge, England (U. atinia)

=== In mythology and literature ===
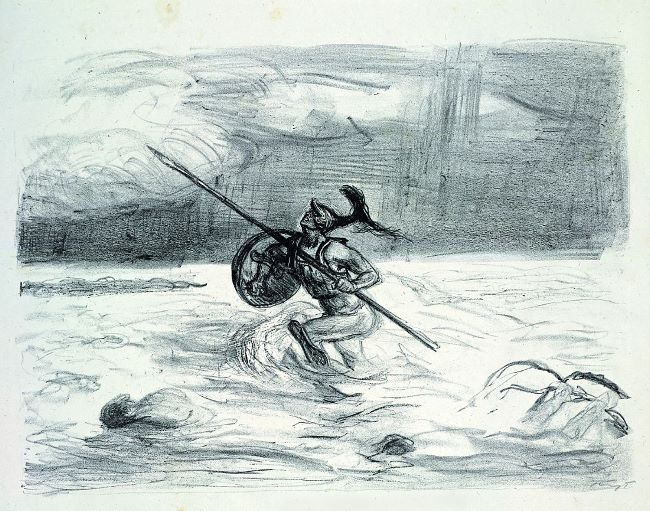
Achilles and Scamander

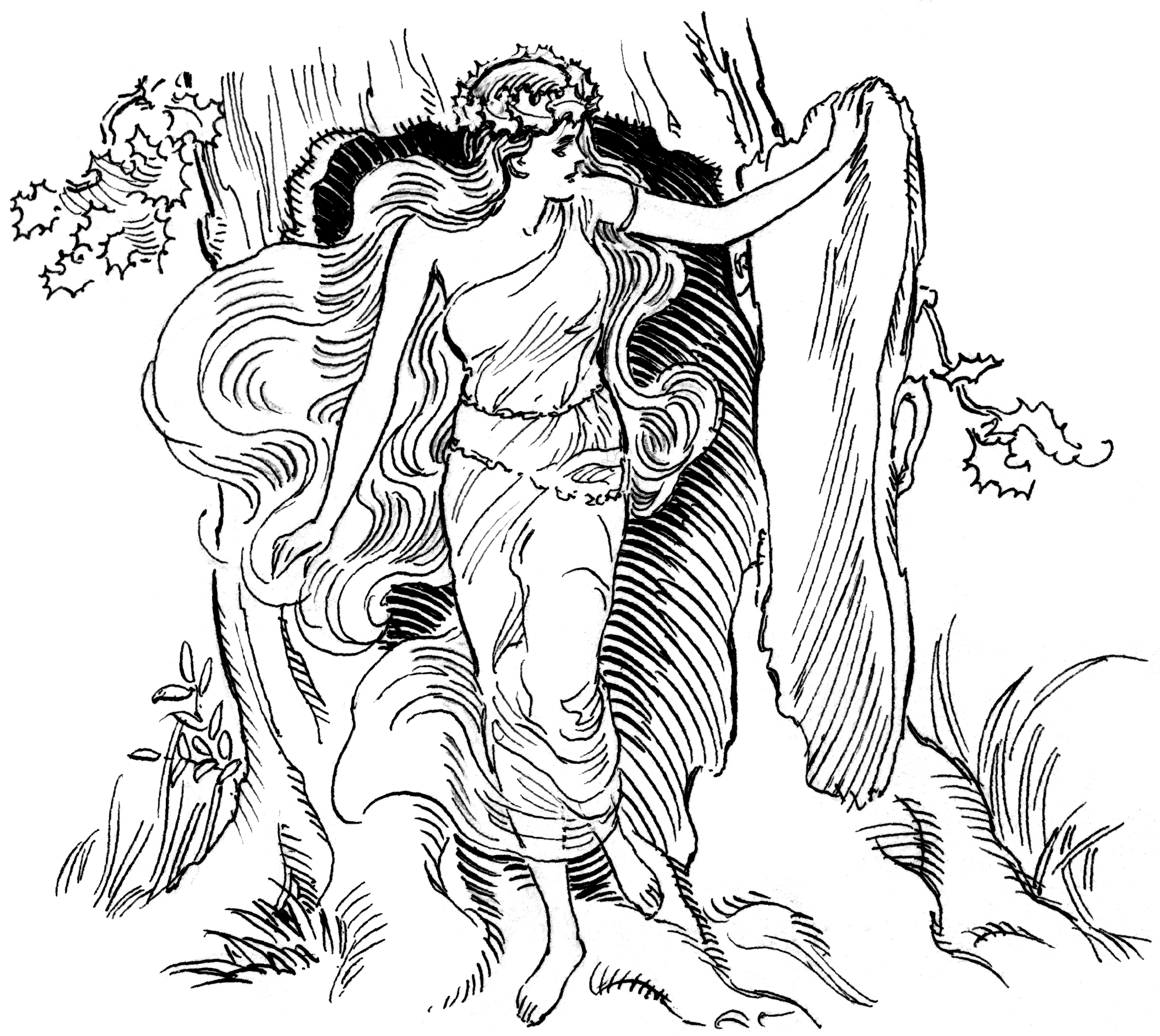
Dryad

In Greek mythology, the nymph Ptelea (Πτελέα, Elm) was one of the eight hamadryads, nymphs of the forest and daughters of Oxylos and Hamadryas. In his Hymn to Artemis, poet Callimachus (third century BC) tells how, at the age of three, the infant goddess Artemis practised her newly acquired silver bow and arrows, made for her by Hephaestus and the Cyclopes, by shooting first at an elm, then at an oak, before turning her aim on a wild animal:

πρῶτον ἐπὶ πτελέην, τὸ δὲ δεύτερον ἧκας ἐπὶ δρῦν, τὸ τρίτον αὖτ᾽ ἐπὶ θῆρα.

The first reference in literature to elms occurs in the Iliad. When Eetion, father of Andromache, is killed by Achilles during the Trojan War, the mountain nymphs plant elms on his tomb ("περί δὲ πτελέας ἐφύτευσαν νύμφαι ὀρεστιάδες, κoῦραι Διὸς αἰγιόχoιo"). Also in the Iliad, when the River Scamander, indignant at the sight of so many corpses in his water, overflows and threatens to drown Achilles, the latter grasps a branch of a great elm in an attempt to save himself ("ὁ δὲ πτελέην ἕλε χερσὶν εὐφυέα μεγάλην").

The nymphs also planted elms on the tomb in the Thracian Chersonese of "great-hearted Protesilaus" ("μεγάθυμου Πρωτεσιλάου"), the first Greek to fall in the Trojan War. These elms grew to be the tallest in the known world, but when their topmost branches saw far off the ruins of Troy, they immediately withered, so great still was the bitterness of the hero buried below, who had been loved by Laodamia and slain by Hector. The story is the subject of a poem by Antiphilus of Byzantium (first century AD) in the Palatine Anthology:

Θεσσαλὲ Πρωτεσίλαε, σὲ μὲν πολὺς ᾄσεται αἰών,
Tρoίᾳ ὀφειλoμένoυ πτώματος ἀρξάμενoν•
σᾶμα δὲ τοι πτελέῃσι συνηρεφὲς ἀμφικoμεῦση
Nύμφαι, ἀπεχθoμένης Ἰλίoυ ἀντιπέρας.
Δένδρα δὲ δυσμήνιτα, καὶ ἤν ποτε τεῖχoς ἴδωσι
Tρώϊον, αὐαλέην φυλλοχoεῦντι κόμην.
ὅσσoς ἐν ἡρώεσσι τότ᾽ ἦν χόλoς, oὗ μέρoς ἀκμὴν
ἐχθρὸν ἐν ἀψύχoις σώζεται ἀκρέμoσιν.

[Thessalian Protesilaos, a long age shall sing your praises,
Of the destined dead at Troy the first;
Your tomb with thick-foliaged elms they covered,
The nymphs, across the water from hated Ilion.
Trees full of anger; and whenever that wall they see,
Of Troy, the leaves in their upper crown wither and fall.
So great in the heroes was the bitterness then, some of which still
Remembers, hostile, in the soulless upper branches.]

Protesilaus had been king of Pteleos (Πτελεός) in Thessaly, which took its name from the abundant elms (πτελέoι) in the region.

Elms occur often in pastoral poetry, where they symbolise the idyllic life, their shade being mentioned as a place of special coolness and peace. In the first Idyll of Theocritus (third century BC), for example, the goatherd invites the shepherd to sit "here beneath the elm" ("δεῦρ' ὑπὸ τὰν πτελέαν") and sing. Beside elms, Theocritus places "the sacred water" ("το ἱερὸν ὕδωρ") of the Springs of the Nymphs and the shrines to the nymphs.

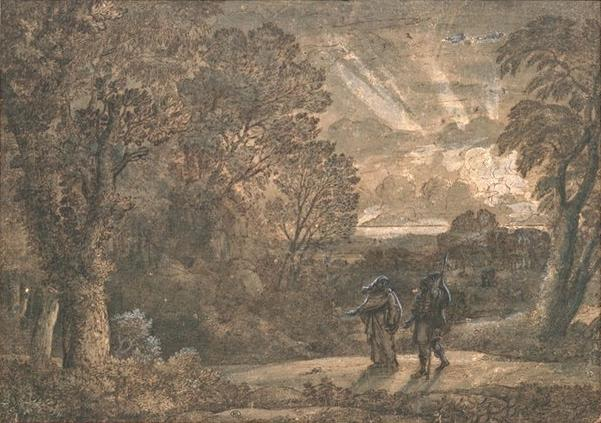
The Sibyl and Aeneas

Aside from references literal and metaphorical to the elm and vine theme, the tree occurs in Latin literature in the Elm of Dreams in the Aeneid. When the Sibyl of Cumae leads Aeneas down to the Underworld, one of the sights is the Stygian Elm:

In medio ramos annosaque bracchia pandit
ulmus opaca, ingens, quam sedem somnia vulgo
uana tenere ferunt, foliisque sub omnibus haerent.

[Spreads in the midst her boughs and agéd arms
an elm, huge, shadowy, where vain dreams, 'tis said,
are wont to roost them, under every leaf close-clinging.]

Virgil refers to a Roman superstition (vulgo) that elms were trees of ill-omen because their fruit seemed to be of no value. It has been noted that two elm-motifs have arisen from classical literature: (1) the 'Paradisal Elm' motif, arising from pastoral idylls and the elm-and-vine theme, and (2) the 'Elm and Death' motif, perhaps arising from Homer's commemorative elms and Virgil's Stygian Elm. Many references to elm in European literature from the Renaissance onwards fit into one or other of these categories.

There are two examples of pteleogenesis (:birth from elms) in world myths. In Germanic and Scandinavian mythology the first woman, Embla, was fashioned from an elm, while in Japanese mythology Kamuy Fuchi, the chief goddess of the Ainu people, "was born from an elm impregnated by the Possessor of the Heavens".

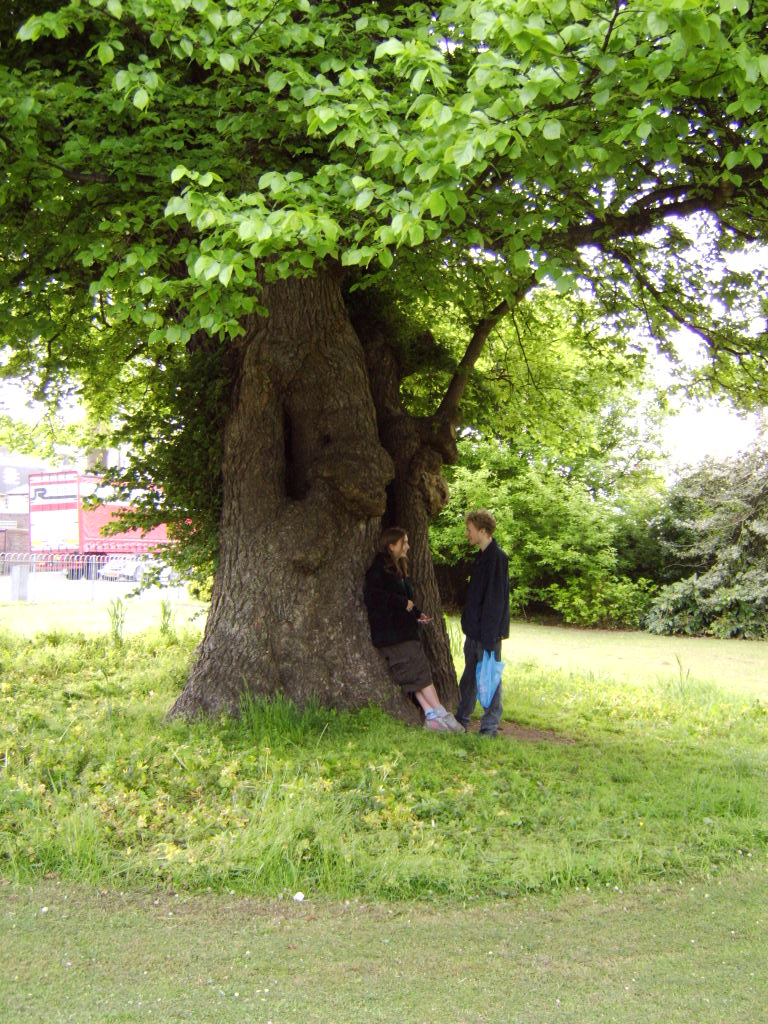
Under the elm, Brighton, 2006

The elm occurs frequently in English literature, one of the best known instances being in Shakespeare's A Midsummer Night's Dream, where Titania, Queen of the Fairies, addresses her beloved Nick Bottom using an elm-simile. Here, as often in the elm-and-vine motif, the elm is a masculine symbol:

Sleep thou, and I will wind thee in my arms.
... the female Ivy so
Enrings the barky fingers of the Elm.
O, how I love thee! how I dote on thee!

Another of the most famous kisses in English literature, that of Paul and Helen at the start of Forster's Howards End, is stolen beneath a great wych elm.

The elm tree is also referenced in children's literature. An Elm Tree and Three Sisters by Norma Sommerdorf is a children's book about three young sisters who plant a small elm tree in their backyard.

=== In politics ===
The cutting of the elm was a diplomatic altercation between the kings of France and England in 1188, during which an elm tree near Gisors in Normandy was felled.

In politics, the elm is associated with revolutions. In England after the Glorious Revolution of 1688, the final victory of parliamentarians over monarchists, and the arrival from Holland, with William III and Mary II, of the Dutch elm hybrid, planting of this cultivar became a fashion among enthusiasts of the new political order.

In the American Revolution, the Liberty Tree was an American white elm in Boston, Massachusetts, in front of which, from 1765, the first resistance meetings were held against British attempts to tax the American colonists without democratic representation. When the British, knowing that the tree was a symbol of rebellion, felled it in 1775, the Americans took to widespread Liberty Elm planting, and sewed elm symbols on to their revolutionary flags. Elm planting by American Presidents later became something of a tradition.

In the French Revolution, too, Les arbres de la liberté (Liberty Trees), often elms, were planted as symbols of revolutionary hopes, the first in Vienne, Isère, in 1790, by a priest inspired by the Boston elm. L'Orme de La Madeleine (:the Elm of La Madeleine), Faycelles, Département de Lot, planted around 1790 and surviving to this day, was a case in point. By contrast, a famous Parisian elm associated with the Ancien Régime, L'Orme de Saint-Gervais in the Place St-Gervais, was felled by the revolutionaries; church authorities planted a new elm in its place in 1846, and an early 20th-century elm stands on the site today. Premier Lionel Jospin, obliged by tradition to plant a tree in the garden of the Hôtel Matignon, the official residence and workplace of Prime Ministers of France, insisted on planting an elm, so-called 'tree of the Left', choosing the new disease-resistant hybrid 'Clone 762' (Ulmus 'Wanoux' = Vada). In the French Republican Calendar, in use from 1792 to 1806, the 12th day of the month Ventôse (= 2 March) was officially named "jour de l'Orme", Day of the Elm.

Liberty Elms were also planted in other countries in Europe to celebrate their revolutions, an example being L'Olmo di Montepaone, L'Albero della Libertà (:the Elm of Montepaone, Liberty Tree) in Montepaone, Calabria, planted in 1799 to commemorate the founding of the democratic Parthenopean Republic, and surviving until it was brought down by a recent storm (it has since been cloned and 'replanted'). After the Greek Revolution of 1821–32, a thousand young elms were brought to Athens from Missolonghi, "Sacred City of the Struggle" against the Turks and scene of Lord Byron's death, and planted in 1839–40 in the National Garden. In an ironic development, feral elms have spread and invaded the grounds of the abandoned Greek royal summer palace at Tatoi in Attica.

In a chance event linking elms and revolution, on the morning of his execution (30 January 1649), walking to the scaffold at the Palace of Whitehall, King Charles I turned to his guards and pointed out, with evident emotion, an elm near the entrance to Spring Gardens that had been planted by his brother in happier days. The tree was said to be still standing in the 1860s.

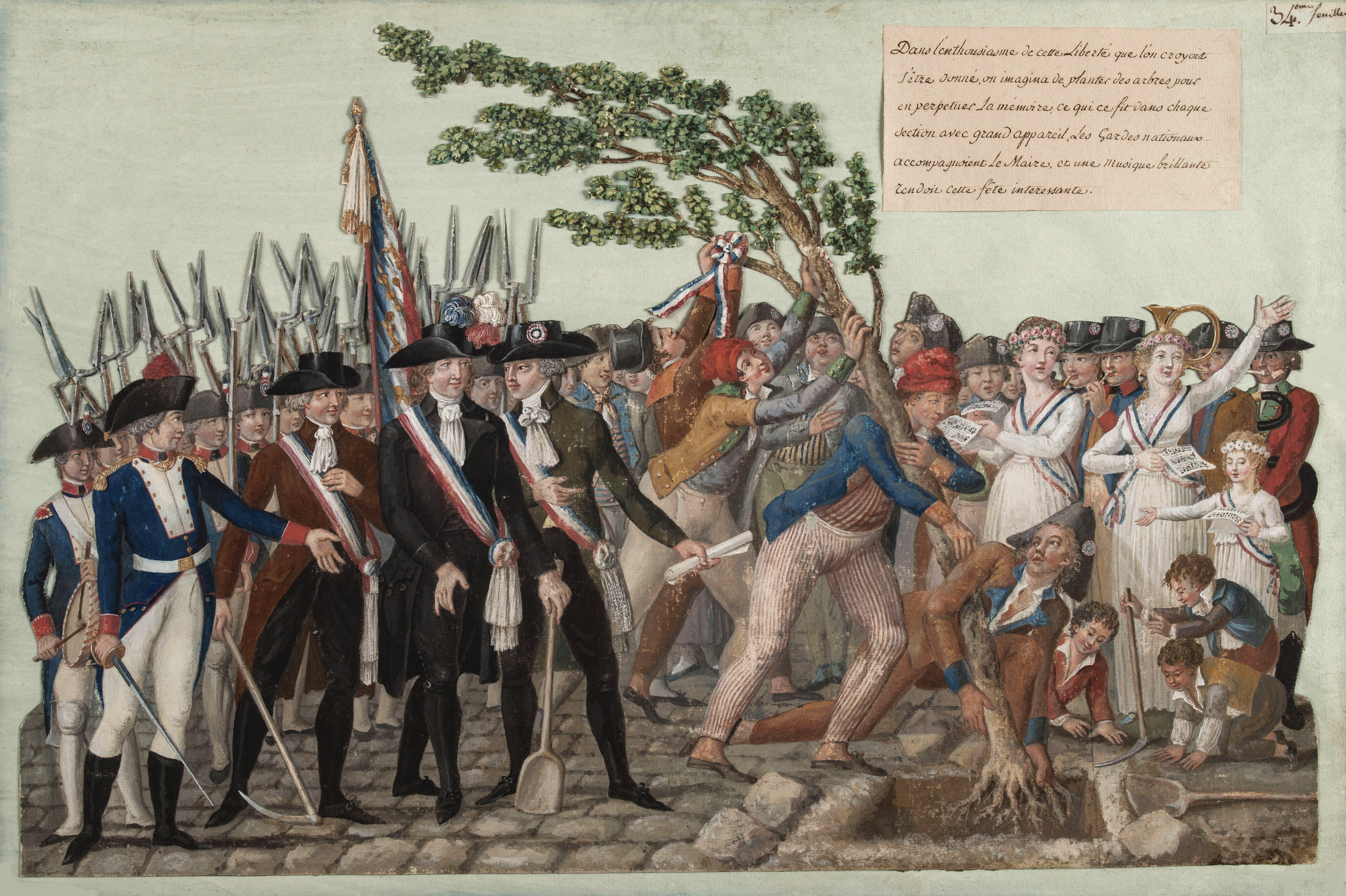
Planting a Liberty Tree (un arbre de la liberté) during the French Revolution. Jean-Baptiste Lesueur, 1790

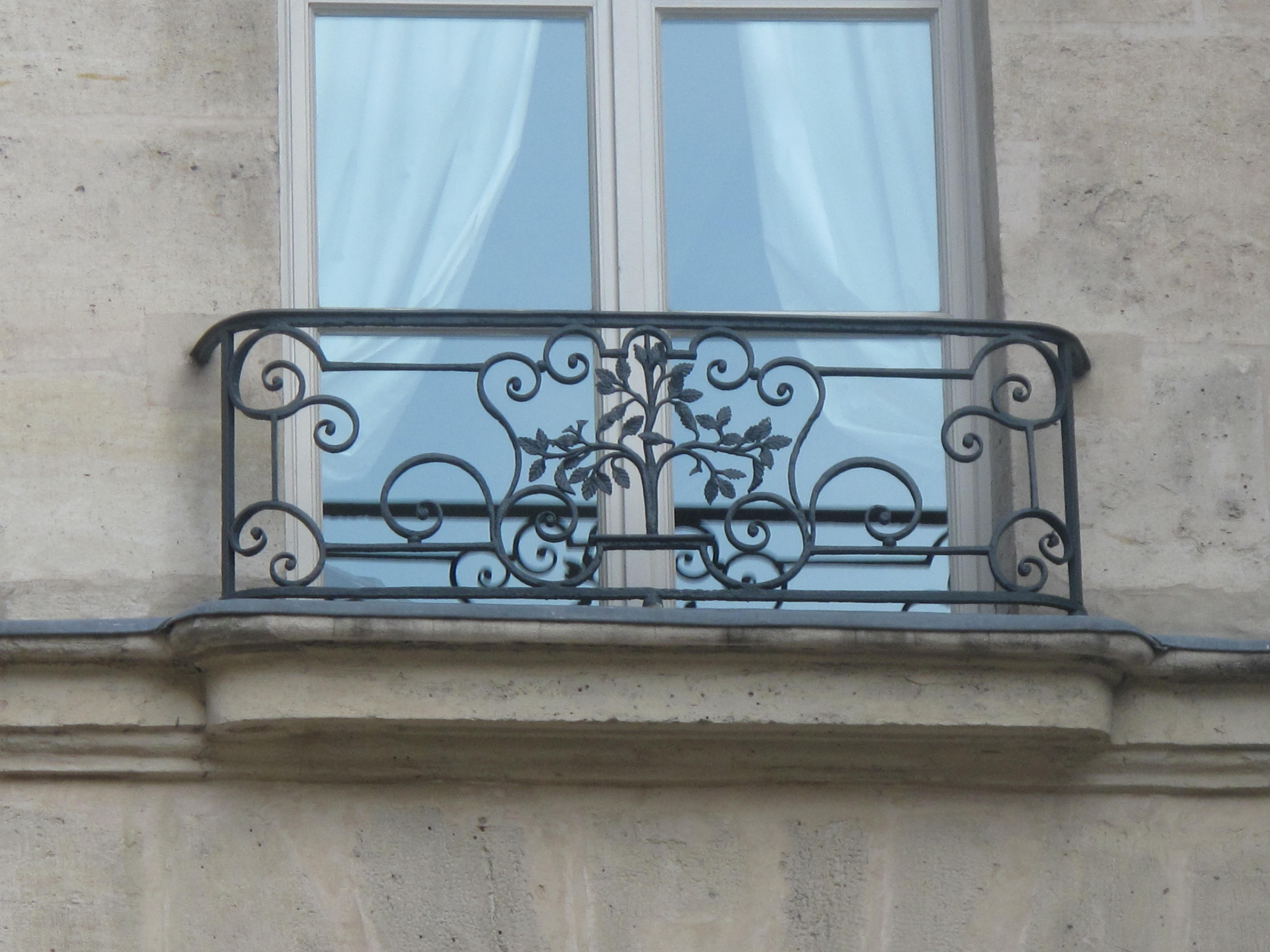
Balcony with elm symbol, overlooking the 'Crossroads of the Elm', Place Saint-Gervais, Paris

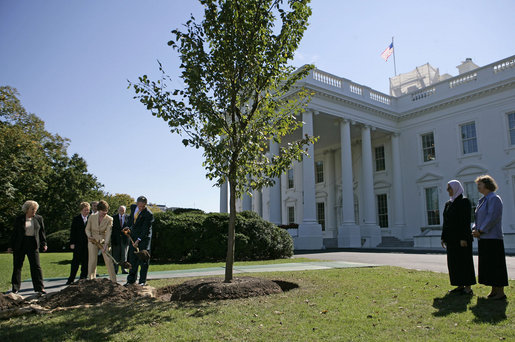
President George W. Bush and Laura Bush planting a disease-resistant 'Jefferson' Elm before the White House, 2006

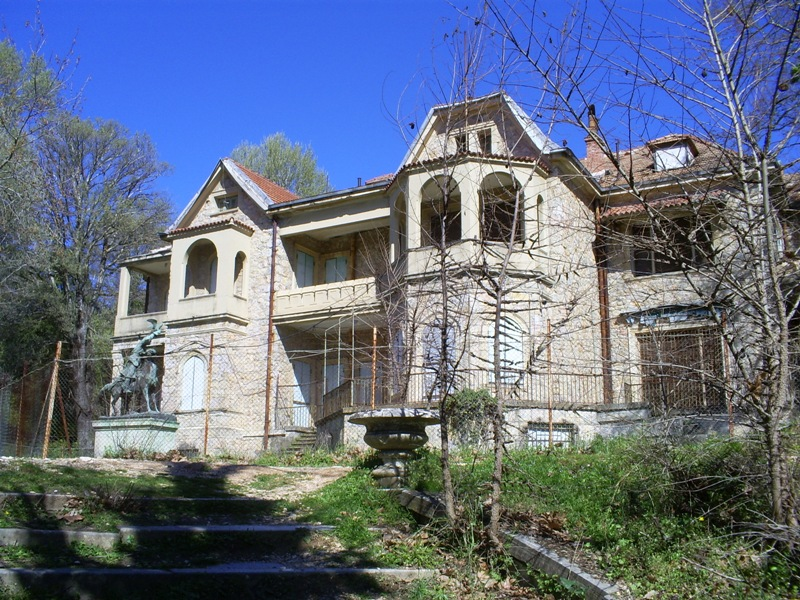
Elm suckers spreading before the abandoned summer royal palace in Tatoi, Greece, Μarch 2008

=== In local history and place names ===
The name of what is now the London neighbourhood of Seven Sisters is derived from seven elms which stood there at the time when it was a rural area, planted a circle with a walnut tree at their centre, and traceable on maps back to 1619. The London area of Nine Elms was also named for a line of elm trees along the road from The Strand to Vauxhall.

== See also ==
- List of elm trees
- Elm Conflict
- Fab Tree Hab

== Monographs ==
- Richens, R. H. (1983). Elm. Cambridge University Press. ISBN 0-521-24916-3. A scientific, historical and cultural study, with a thesis on elm-classification, followed by a systematic survey of elms in England, region by region. Illustrated.
- Heybroek, H. M., Goudzwaard, L, Kaljee, H. (2009). Iep of olm, karakterboom van de Lage Landen (:Elm, a tree with character of the Low Countries). KNNV, Uitgeverij. ISBN 9789050112819. A history of elm planting in the Netherlands, concluding with a 40 – page illustrated review of all the DED – resistant cultivars in commerce in 2009.
