= Protein quality =

Protein ranking for human nutrition

Daily per capita protein supply

Protein quality is the digestibility and quantity of essential amino acids for providing the proteins in correct ratios for human consumption. There are various methods that rank the quality of different types of protein, some of which are outdated and no longer in use, or not considered as useful as they once were thought to be. The Protein Digestibility Corrected Amino Acid Score (PDCAAS), which was recommended by the Food and Agriculture Organization of the United Nations (FAO), became the industry standard in 1993. FAO has recently recommended the newer Digestible Indispensable Amino Acid Score (DIAAS) to supersede PDCAAS.

== Considerations ==
=== Amino Acid Score ===
The amino acid score is based on the proportion of amino acids in a food, compared to nutritional requirements. As such, only essential amino acids are considered in the two most common measurements of quality, the PDCAAS and the DIAAS.

The following is a table of the amino acid profiles of some common protein sources, not accounting for digestibility. The requirement profile is the required amounts of an amino acid in every 100 g of protein in the Dietary Reference Intake. Each profile reflects the amount of an amino acid per 100 g of protein, not 100 g of the food source.

In considering protein quality, the sulfur amino acids (methionine + cystine) and the aromatic amino acids (phenylalanine + tyrosine) are grouped together. This is because while methionine and phenylalanine are essential amino acids, cystine and tyrosine are synthesized from methione and phenylalanine, respectively. Nevertheless, common protein analytical methods such as ISO 13903 can easily distinguish these pairs of amino acids.

Additionally, glutamic acid is easilty interconvertible with glutamine and aspartic acid is easily interconvertible with asparginine. easily interconvertible, via acid hydrolysis. Thus, common amino acid analysis methods such as ISO 13903 only measure glutamic acid and aspartic acid, not glutamine or asparginine, and these measured values may be treated as a sum of the two.

Selenocysteine is usually not measured as part of amino acid analysis. It is usually analyzed directly as the amount of selenium, which mostly occurs as selenomethionine and selenocysteine in food.

First limiting amino acid
Second limiting amino acid, especially depending on certain age requirements and demanding conditions for EAAs
Amino acid may be limiting after accounting for digestibility

Amino acid profiles and requirements
Essential Amino Acids	Required (DRI)	Human breast milk	Quinoa	Corn	Oat	Hemp seeds (shelled)	Green peas	Soybeans (Edamame)	Spirulina	Chlorella	Whey	Casein	Egg white
Histidine	1.8 g	2.230 g	3.455 g	2.710 g	2.414 g	2.821 g	2.495 g	2.756 g	1.888 g	3.3 g	1.974 g	3.2 g	2.660 g
Isoleucine**	2.5 g	5.673 g	4.279 g	3.928 g	4.137 g	3.744 g	4.547 g	4.514 g	5.584 g	3.5 g	5.001 g	5.4 g	6.064 g
Leucine**	5.5 g	9.623 g	7.132 g	10.597 g	7.654 g	6.296 g	7.532 g	7.334 g	8.608 g	6.1 g	9.475 g	9.5 g	9.321 g
Lysine	5.1 g	6.888 g	6.503 g	4.172 g	4.179 g	3.714 g	7.392 g	6.138 g	5.264 g	10.2 g	8.554 g	8.5 g	7.394 g
Meth + Cyst	2.5 g	4.052 g	4.346 g	2.832 g	4.292 g	4.672 g	2.658 g	2.178 g	3.151 g	1.6 g	3.684 g	3.5 g	6.293 g
Phen + Tyr	4.7 g	10.029 g	7.302 g	8.132 g	8.751 g	7.889 g	7.332 g	8.316 g	9.328 g	5.6 g	5.790 g	11.1 g	10.486 g
Threonine	2.7 g	4.660 g	3.574 g	3.928 g	3.428 g	3.694 g	4.734 g	4.087 g	5.168 g	2.9 g	5.001 g	4.2 g	4.119 g
Tryptophan	0.7 g	1.722 g	1.418 g	0.700 g	1.395 g	1.074 g	0.863 g	1.243 g	1.616 g	2.1 g	2.106 g	1.4 g	1.147 g
Valine**	3.2 g	6.382 g	5.043 g	5.633 g	5.585 g	5.173 g	5.480 g	4.562 g	6.111 g	5.5 g	5.001 g	6.3 g	7.422 g
Total EAAs	28.7 g	51.259 g	43.052 g	42.632 g	46.014 g	39.077 g	43.033 g	41.128 g	46.718 g	40.8 g	46.586 g	53.1 g	54.906 g
Individual Essential Amino Acids	Requirement	Human breast milk	Quinoa	Corn	Oat	Hemp seeds (shelled)	Green peas	Soybeans (Edamame)	Spirulina	Chlorella	Whey	Casein	Egg white
Meth	To be filled	N/A	N/A	N/A	N/A	N/A	N/A	N/A	N/A	N/A	N/A	N/A	N/A
Phen	To be filled	N/A	N/A	N/A	N/A	N/A	N/A	N/A	N/A	N/A	N/A	N/A	N/A
Non-Essential Amino Acids	Required?	Human breast milk	Quinoa	Corn	Oat	Hemp seeds (shelled)	Green peas	Soybeans (Edamame)	Spirulina	Chlorella	Whey	Casein	Egg white
Alanine	Varies	3.647 g	4.992 g	8.983 g	5.252 g	4.448 g	5.597 g	4.609 g	7.856 g	7.7 g	4.343 g	N/A	6.458 g
Arginine*	Varies	4.356	9.263 g	3.989 g	7.106 g	13.245 g	9.981 g	8.253 g	7.216 g	15.8 g	2.764 g	3.7 g	5.945 g
Asparagine*	Varies	N/A	N/A	N/A	N/A	N/A	N/A	N/A	N/A	N/A	N/A	N/A	N/A
Aspartic acid	Varies	8.307 g	9.628 g	7.430 g	8.632 g	10.660 g	11.567 g	11.943 g	10.080 g	6.4 g	9.738 g	N/A	11.192 g
Cysteine*	Varies	N/A	N/A	N/A	N/A	N/A	N/A	N/A	N/A	N/A	N/A	N/A	N/A
Glutamic acid	Varies	17.018 g	15.834 g	19.366 g	22.127 g	18.249 g	17.280 g	19.269 g	14.592 g	7.8 g	17.898 g	N/A	14.220 g
Glutamine*	Varies	N/A	N/A	N/A	N/A	N/A	N/A	N/A	N/A	N/A	N/A	N/A	N/A
Glycine*	Varies	2.634 g	5.892 g	3.867 g	5.013 g	4.690 g	4.291 g	4.269 g	5.392 g	6.2 g	1.842 g	N/A	3.789 g
Proline*	Varies	8.307 g	6.563 g	8.891 g	5.568 g	4.649 g	4.034 g	4.807 g	4.145	7.2 g	5.922 g	N/A	3.991 g
Selenocysteine	Varies	N/A	N/A	N/A	N/A	N/A	N/A	N/A	N/A	N/A	N/A	N/A	N/A
Serine*	Varies	4.356 g	4.814 g	4.659 g	4.471 g	4.987 g	4.221 g	5.710 g	5.217	3.3 g	4.606 g	N/A	7.321 g
Tyrosine*	Varies	5.369 g	2.267 g	3.745 g	3.409 g	3.677 g	2.658 g	3.675 g	4.496 g	2.8 g	2.500 g	N/A	4.193 g
Total non-EAAs		53.994 g	58.257 g	60.93 g	61.578 g	64.605 g	59.629 g	62.535 g	58.994 g	57.2 g	49.613 g	N/A	57.109 g
22nd Amino Acid	Required?	Human breast milk	Quinoa	Corn	Oat	Hemp seeds (shelled)	Green peas	Soybeans (Edamame)	Spirulina	Chlorella	Whey	Casein	Egg white
Pyrrolysine	Not used by humans	N/A	N/A	N/A	N/A	N/A	N/A	N/A	N/A	N/A	N/A	N/A	N/A

*Semi-essential, under certain conditions
**Branched-chain amino acid (BCAA)

=== Protein digestibility ===
For many foods, the quantity of amino acids absorbed by the body may differ significantly from the quantities of amino acids originally present in the food, as a result of various digestive processes. The digestion of proteins begins in the stomach and is largely complete by the time food exits the small intestine. However, digestion may be reduced by antinutritional factors or the presence of other food components such as dietary fiber. Gut microbes may also impact protein digestion due to their own digestion of protein.

Digestibility may also differ between amino acids. While the fecal digestibility of the whole protein is likely a fair approximation of the digestibility of individual amino acids for non-legume (beans, peas, lentils) proteins with a maximum difference of 10%, with legume proteins, the digestibility of methionine, cystine, and tryptophan can be overestimated.

=== Food Preparation ===
The cooking of protein sources, particularly animal protein, may significantly alter both the composition and digestibility of amino acids. Since this is not always reflected in nutritional data, changes during cooking may be factored into measurements of protein quality. For example, the browning of many meats causes the Maillard reaction, which may decrease the availability of lysine, the limiting amino acid for many foods. As a result, it is recommended to use lysine as the limiting amino acid for any food likely to have undergone the Maillard reaction.

=== Age-related differences ===
While the amino acid scores for PDCAAS and DIAAS are based on toddler requirements (1–3 year olds), the essential amino acid requirements differ for adults and infants. The most demanding essential amino acid requirements are for infants; when children become adults, they need lower proportions of essential amino acids. This also means that many of the vegan protein sources that are limited in one or more essential amino acids, are actually less deficient in essential amino acids for adults, perhaps not deficient at all. Old age and pregnancy also change amino acid requirements, because of the necessity of supporting a fetus or slowing the loss of muscle due to age. The essential amino acid requirements for infants are based on the essential amino acid proportions in human breast milk.

Essential amino acid requirements (mg per g of protein)
Amino Acid required	Infants	1–3 year olds	Adults (18+ y)
Histidine	23	18	17
Isoleucine	57	25	23
Leucine	101	55	52
Lysine	69	51	47
Methionine + Cysteine	38	25	23
Phenylalanine + Tyrosine	87	47	41
Threonine	47	27	24
Tryptophan	18	7	6
Valine	56	32	29
Total Essential Amino Acids	496	287	262

== Measures ==
Primitive measures of protein quality use relatively few measurements about the body, mainly mass measurements.

- Protein efficiency ratio (PER) is the ratio of weight gain to the amount of protein ingested. It is usually tested with rats.
- Biological value (BV) essentially estimates the proportion of food nitrogen kept in the body by subtracting out nitrogen found in urine and feces. Nitrogen is assumed to originate from protein.
- Net protein utilization (NPU) is similar, except it only subtracts out urine nitrogen. They are methods based on nitrogen balance.

Modern measurements analyze two separate aspects: protein digestibility and amino acid balance. The former is measured by comparing how much protein is found in the food before and after it goes through the digestive tract or a part of it. The latter is measured by taking the amino acid profile of a protein and comparing it to essential amino acid needs of an organism, typically humans.

=== PDCAAS ===
The earlier "modern" measurement is the PDCAAS of 1989. For protein digestibility it compares the amount of protein-nitrogen that goes into a rat and out of the rat through feces, with a correction for "metabolic fecal protein": the amount of protein that occurs in feces when the rat is on a protein-free diet. For the amino acid score, it considers the quantity of each essential amino acid in the food as a proportion of the food's protein content and compares this to nutritional recommendations for preschool-age kids. The amino acid score used is that of the lowest, or 'limiting', amino acid. The amino acid score is then multiplied with the fecal digestibility score to get an overall score between zero and one.

The PDCAAS has a tendency to over-estimate digestibility, because it measures feces instead of what remains at the end of the small intestine, where most protein absorption is believed to occur. Antinutrient factors like phytic acid and trypsin inhibitors may decrease absorption of protein, as does the absorption of protein by gut bacteria in the test subject's large intestine. In addition, older rats show lower PDCAAS-estimated fecal digestibility compared to young rats when the protein source contains anti-nutritional factors.

=== DIAAS ===
To address the problems of PDCAAS, DIAAS was introduced in 2013. It measures digestibility from the mouth to the end of the ileum (the final section of the small intestine) individually for every amino acid. The absorbed amount of each essential amino acid is compared with the reference pattern. In other words, it scores the amino acid profile of what is actually absorbed. It also considers age by using different reference patterns for infants, toddlers, and people over three. DIAAS is considered the superior method to PDCAAS.

DIAAS is more complicated to measure than PDCAAS partly because the contents of the ileum are harder to obtain than simple collection of feces. Moreover, DIAAS prefers digestibilities measured in humans, though a growing pig or growing rat are acceptable alternatives. For measurement in humans, a minimally invasive dual-tracer method has been developed for the DIAAS method.

== Protein sources ==
Protein ranking methods and standards
Protein type	PER	NPU	BV	Protein Digestibility (PD)	Protein absorption rate	Amino Acid Score (AAS)	PDCAAS	DIAAS	Limiting amino acid	Complete protein?
Cow's milk	2.5	82%	91	95	3.5 g/h	127	1.0		(Met+Cys)	Yes
Whey	3.2	92%	104		8–10 g/h		1.0	0.973–1.09	His	Yes
Casein	2.5	71.2%	77	94.0%	6.1 g/h	1.19	1.0	1.45	(Met+Cys)	Yes
Egg	3.9	94%	100	97–98%	1.3–2.8 g/h	1.19	1.0	1.13	(His)	Yes
Beef	2.9	73%	80	94–98%		0.94	0.92		Trp	Yes
Oat				72, 91%		0.63	0.57		Lys	No
Wheat	0.8	67%	64	96–99%		0.26, 0.44	0.25–0.51	0.45	Lys	No
Maize	1.23			85%, 89%			0.67		Lys	No
Rice	2.2						0.42	0.37	Lys	No
Quinoa		75.7%	82.6	91.7%		0.97	0.667		Leu	Yes
Soy	2.2	61%	74	95–98%	3.9 g/h		0.91–1.0	0.90–0.91	Met+Cys	Yes
Black bean							0.75	0.53-0.65	Met+Cys	No
Pea				88%			0.89	0.82–1.00	Met+Cys	Yes
Peanut	1.8			94		0.75	0.52		Lys	No
Hemp			87	94.9%		0.64	0.61		Lys	No
Mycoprotein				86%			0.996		Met+Cys	No
Spirulina	1.8-2.6	53–92%	68	83–90%		1.10			Lys	Yes
Chlorella									Met+Cys	No

Notes:

- With scores greater or equal to 1.0 or 100%, the concept of "limiting amino acid" technically still applies as the amino acid with the lowest ratio compared to the amounts in the reference protein. It is hardly relevant, however, so such columns are parenthesized.
- PD is determined per PDCAAS ("true fecal") unless otherwise stated.
- AAS explicitly does not take into account digestibility. It compares the amino acid profile to a reference profile, which is the PDCAAS profile unless otherwise stated.
- Limiting AA may be determined by either PDCAAS (or a similar profile-only method) or the DIAAS (which gives the limiting absorbed AA). If unstated it is more likely to be PDCAAS.
- PDCAAS values are officially capped, but the limit can be removed by manually calculating PD × AAS. Examples of 5 uncapped values are seen in Schaafsma (2000).

== Implications ==
Since their introduction, modern measures of protein quality have been used to justify nutritional advice on the selection of protein sources and related public policy. As typical values for plant sources of protein are often considerably lower than those of animal protein, the PDCAAS and DIAAS have been used in discussions of the merit of plant-based diets, and arguments around plant-based diets have been used to evaluate the merits of protein quality measurements. Advocates of the importance of animal proteins point to the health benefits of such a diet, as well as the potential for protein insufficiency in a plant-based diet. On the other hand, advocates of a more plant-based diet point to the environmental impacts of meat production, the health risks of a diet rich in red or processed meat, as well as other unrelated health benefits of plant sources of protein.

The choice of protein quality measurement also has implications for debates around plant-based diets. Plant sources of protein are more likely than animal sources to have a lower DIAAS than PDCAAS, so the use of DIAAS rather than PDCAAS may increase nominal discrepancies in protein quality between plant and animal sources. On the regulatory scale, this may affect how plant sources of protein may be marketed. For example, the USDA allows foods with at least 10% of RDI of protein to be labeled as a "good source" of protein, and for a food to be labeled "high" in protein, it must contain at least 20% of RDI, accounting for quality. The use of DIAAS would change which plant foods may be marketed as high protein, and thus consumer perception of their dietary choices.

The comparison of different sources of protein has implications on both the consumer level and the policy level. Especially as nutrition labels generally describe a food product as sold, they do not necessarily reflect protein quality or changes due to food preparation, so consumers may use measures of protein quality of the food as prepared as an additional source of nutritional guidance. In the developing world, malnutrition may be characterized by a lack of protein. Measuring protein quality may further detail the nature of this malnutrition and have implications for treatment. Additionally, in the context of global development, research on the relative merits of plant and animal proteins takes on an environmental significance, because the trajectory of dietary improvement in developing nations could significantly affect the environment.

== Limitations and Future Directions ==
=== Determining ileal digestibility ===
While more accurate, the determination of ileal digestibility of various protein sources requires human or porcine subjects, making research much more difficult than in mice. While the body of research on food ileal digestibilities has grown since the introduction of the DIAAS, as of 2025, more research is still needed, particularly on foods outside of Western or Eastern diets.

=== Focus on individual food sources ===
A common criticism of both the PDCAAS and the DIAAS is that calculating the PDCAAS/DIAAS of a diet solely based on the PDCAAS/DIAAS of the individual constituents is misleading, because one food may provide an abundance of an amino acid that the other is missing, in which case the PDCAAS/DIAAS of the diet is higher than that of any one of the constituents. To arrive at the final result, all individual amino acids would have to be taken into account, so the protein quality of each constituent would be superfluous.

For example, various cereals have protein qualities between 0.4 and 0.8 and are generally limited by lysine, but contain more than enough methionine. Legumes, with the exception of soy, generally have protein qualities between 0.5 and 0.8 and are limited by methionine rather than lysine. When eaten together in the optimal ratio, the quality of the combined constituent may be as high as 1.0, because each constituent's protein is complemented by the other.

A more extreme example would be the combination of gelatine (which contains virtually no tryptophan and thus has a PDCAAS close to 0) with isolated tryptophan (which, lacking all other essential amino acids, also has a PDCAAS of 0). Despite individual scores of 0, the combination of both in adequate amounts has a positive PDCAAS, with the limiting amino acids isoleucine, threonine, and methionine. Further, according to a 2000 study by Gerjan Schaafsma, "The questions about the validity of the amino acid scoring pattern and the application of the true fecal rather than the true ileal digestibility correction, as well as the truncation of PDCAAS values warrant a critical evaluation of PDCAAS in its current form as a measure of protein quality in human diets."

=== Use of multi-amino acid scores ===
While the DIAAS has come to supersede the PDCAAS as the measurement of choice, the original recommendation of the FAO when proposing the DIAAS was that each essential amino acid be treated as a separate nutrient. This would eliminate the need to consider protein content or quality, and would arguably simplify the analysis of the nutrition of meals rather than individual foods. One proposal along these lines is the EAA-9 score, which would measure the percent of RDI of the limiting amino acid of a serving of food. These would be used to determine the EAA-9 Equivalence Serving, or the amount of a food necessary to provide the same amount of that amino acid as an egg.
