= Protein (nutrient) =

Nutrient for the human body

Amino acids are the building blocks of protein.

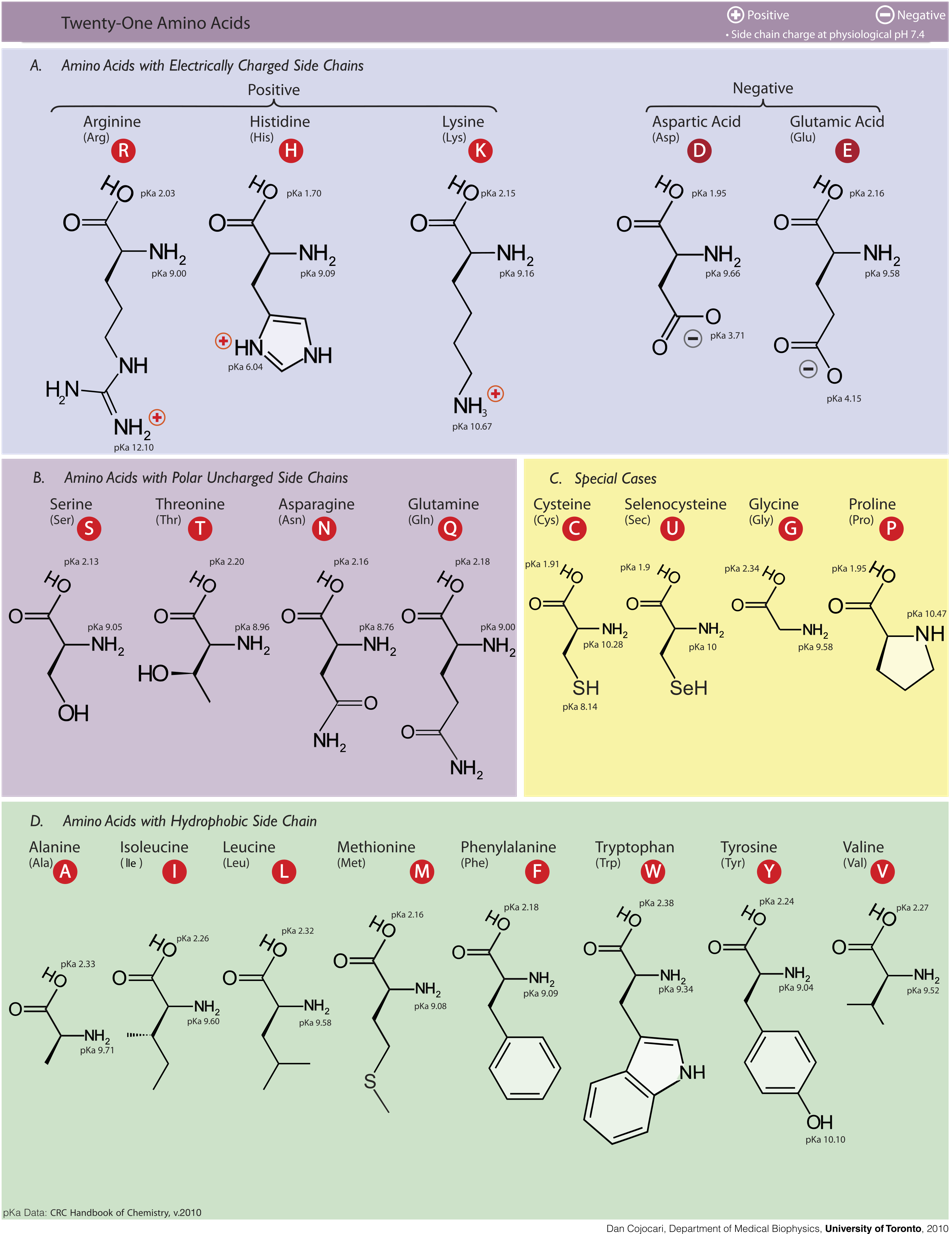
Amino acids are necessary nutrients. Present in every cell, they are also precursors to nucleic acids, co-enzymes, hormones, immune response, repair and other molecules essential for life.

Proteins are essential nutrients for the human body. They are one of the constituents of body tissue and also serve as a fuel source. As fuel, proteins have the same energy density as carbohydrates: 17 kJ (4 kcal) per gram. From a nutritional perspective, the defining characteristic of protein is its amino acid composition. Protein content in foods is commonly measured based on nitrogen content, as nitrogen is a fundamental component of amino acids.

Proteins are polymer chains made of amino acids linked by peptide bonds. During human digestion, proteins are broken down in the stomach into smaller polypeptide chains via hydrochloric acid and protease actions. This is crucial for the absorption of the essential amino acids that cannot be biosynthesized by the body.

There are nine essential amino acids that humans cannot biosynthesize and thus must obtain from their diet to prevent protein-energy malnutrition and resulting death. They are phenylalanine, valine, threonine, tryptophan, methionine, leucine, isoleucine, lysine, and histidine. There has been debate as to whether there are eight or nine essential amino acids. The consensus seems to lean toward nine since histidine is not synthesized in adults. There are five amino acids that the human body can synthesize: alanine, aspartic acid, asparagine, glutamic acid and serine. There are six conditionally essential amino acids whose synthesis can be limited under special pathophysiological conditions, such as prematurity in the infant or individuals in severe catabolic distress: arginine, cysteine, glycine, glutamine, proline and tyrosine. Dietary sources of protein include grains, legumes, nuts, seeds, meats, dairy products, fish, and eggs.

== Functions ==
After water, proteins account for more mass in an organism than any other type of molecule. Protein is present in every cell, and it is a structural component of every body tissue and organ, including hair, skin, blood, and bone. Protein is especially abundant in muscle. Cellular messengers (hormones) and transport molecules are constructed from proteins, including enzymes and antibodies, as are cell membrane components, such as glycoproteins, G proteins, and ion channels. The types of amino acids and their sequence determine the unique 3-dimensional structure and function of a protein.

Amino acids obtained through protein catabolism also enable the biosynthesis of non-protein molecules that are essential for life, such as nucleotides, certain neurotransmitters, and heme.

== Sources ==
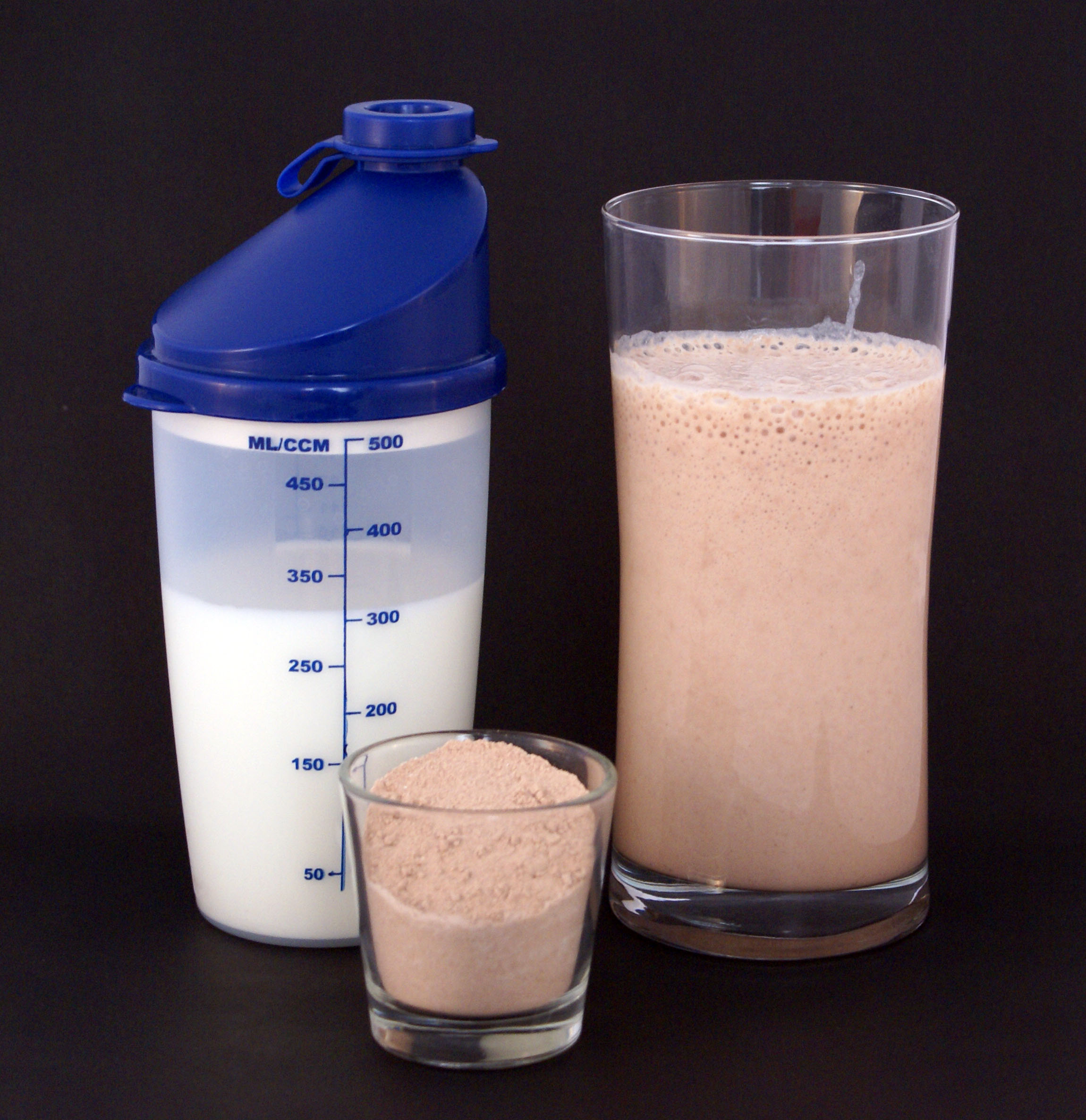
Protein milkshakes, made from protein powder (center) and milk (left), are a common bodybuilding supplement

Protein occurs in a wide range of food. On a worldwide basis, plant protein foods contribute over 60% of the per capita supply of protein. In North America, animal-derived foods contribute about 70% of protein sources. Insects are a source of protein in many parts of the world. In parts of Africa, up to 50% of dietary protein derives from insects. It is estimated that more than 2 billion people eat insects daily.

Protein powders—such as casein, whey, egg, rice, soy and cricket flour—are processed and manufactured sources of protein. People eating a balanced diet do not need protein supplements.

The table below presents food groups as protein sources.

| Food source | Lysine | Threonine | Tryptophan | Sulfur-containing amino acids |
|---|---|---|---|---|
| Legumes | 64 | 38 | 12 | 25 |
| Cereals and whole grains | 31 | 32 | 12 | 37 |
| Nuts and seeds | 45 | 36 | 17 | 46 |
| Fruits | 45 | 29 | 11 | 27 |
| Animal | 85 | 44 | 12 | 38 |

Colour key:

Protein source with highest density of respective amino acid.
Protein source with lowest density of respective amino acid.

=== Animal-based protein ===
Nutritional value and environmental impact of animal products, compared to agriculture overall
| Categories | Contribution of farmed animal product [%] |
|---|---|
| Calories | 18 |
| Proteins | 37 |
| Land use | 83 |
| Greenhouse gases | 58 |
| Water pollution | 57 |
| Air pollution | 56 |
| Freshwater withdrawals | 33 |

Some sources of animal-based protein

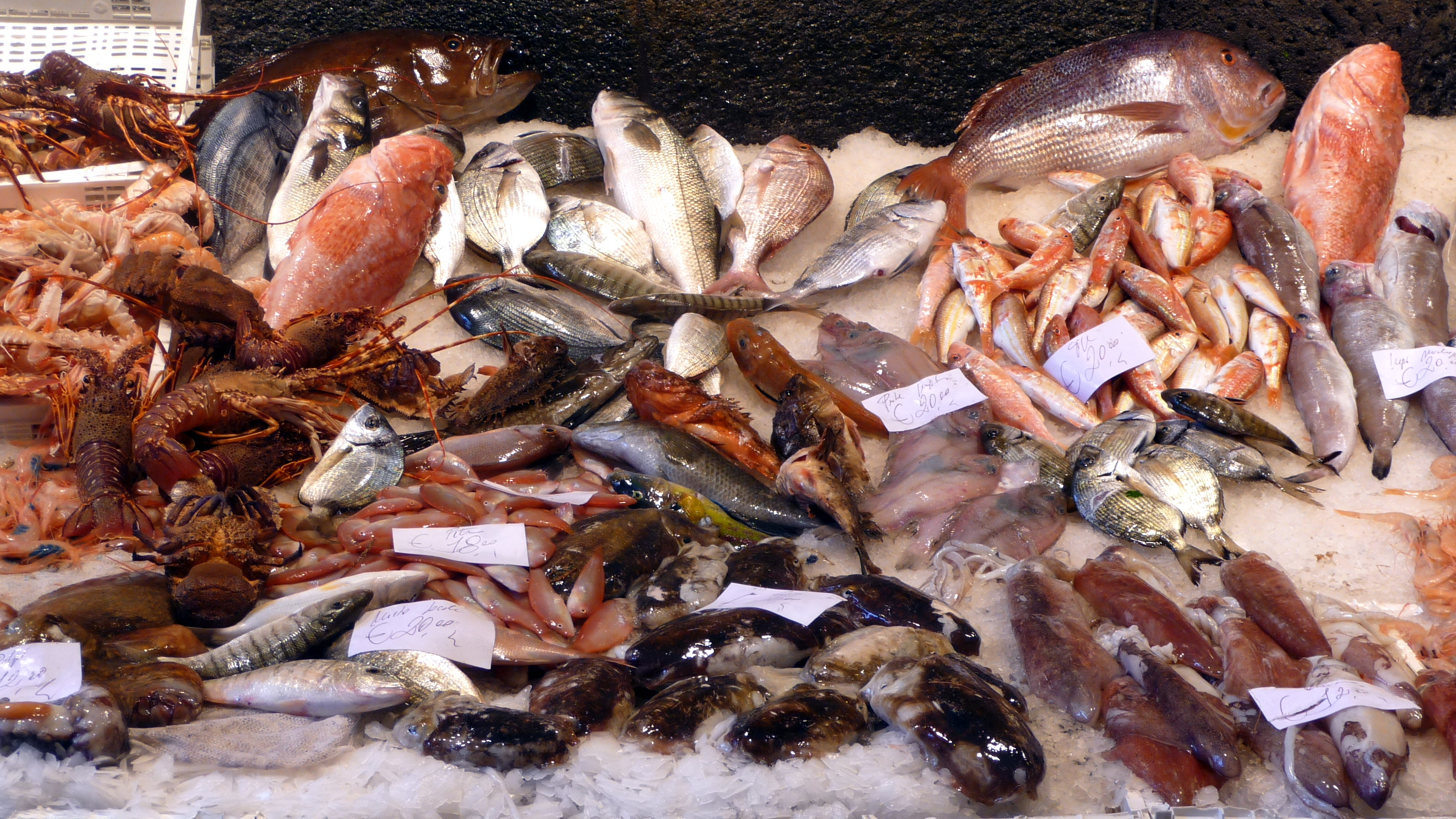
Seafood

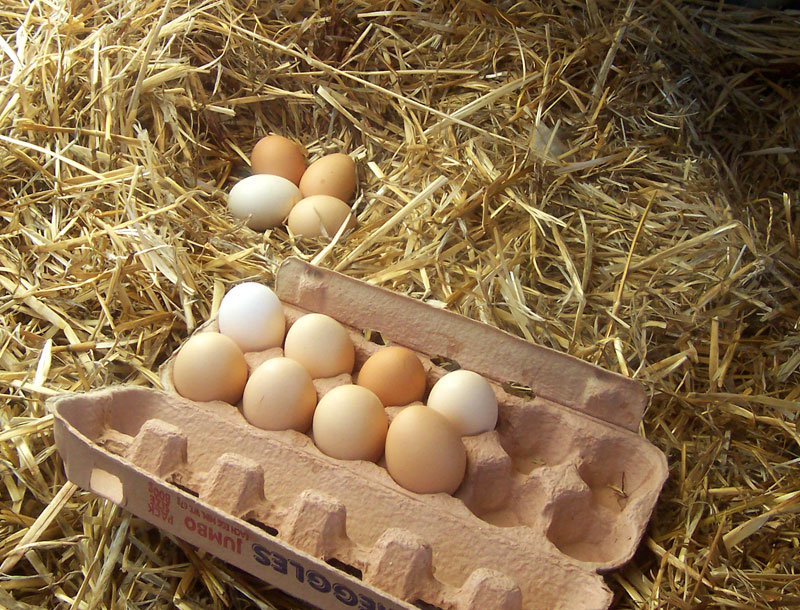
Eggs

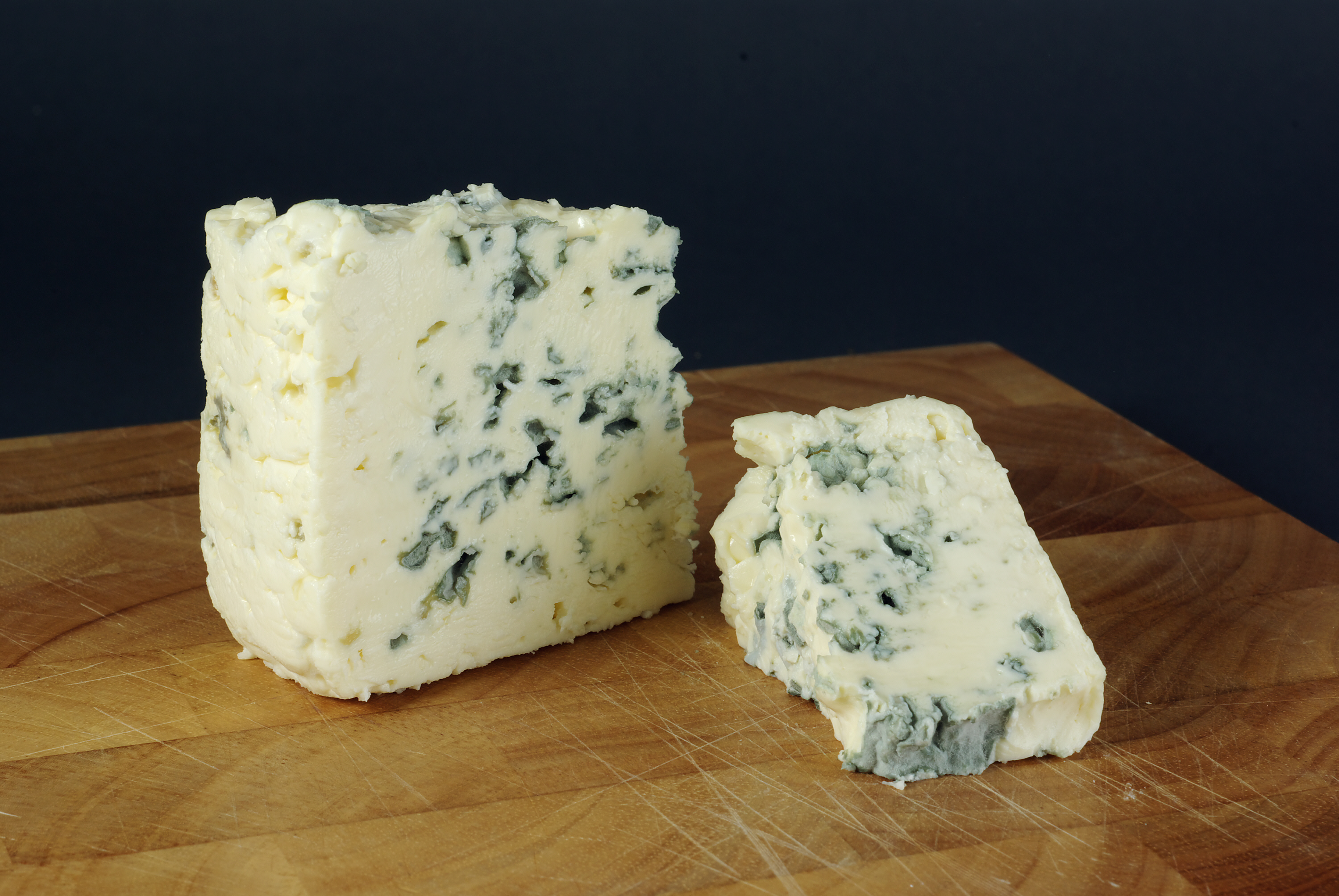
Cheese

Meat, dairy, eggs, soybeans, fish, whole grains, and cereals are sources of protein. Examples of food staples and cereal sources of protein, each with a concentration greater than 7%, are (in no particular order) buckwheat, oats, rye, millet, maize (corn), rice, wheat, sorghum, amaranth, and quinoa. Game meat is an affordable protein source in some countries.

=== Non-animal-based protein ===
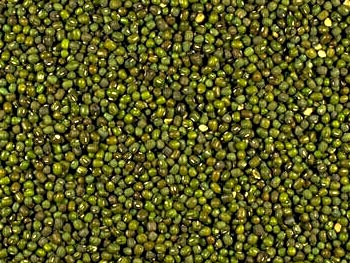
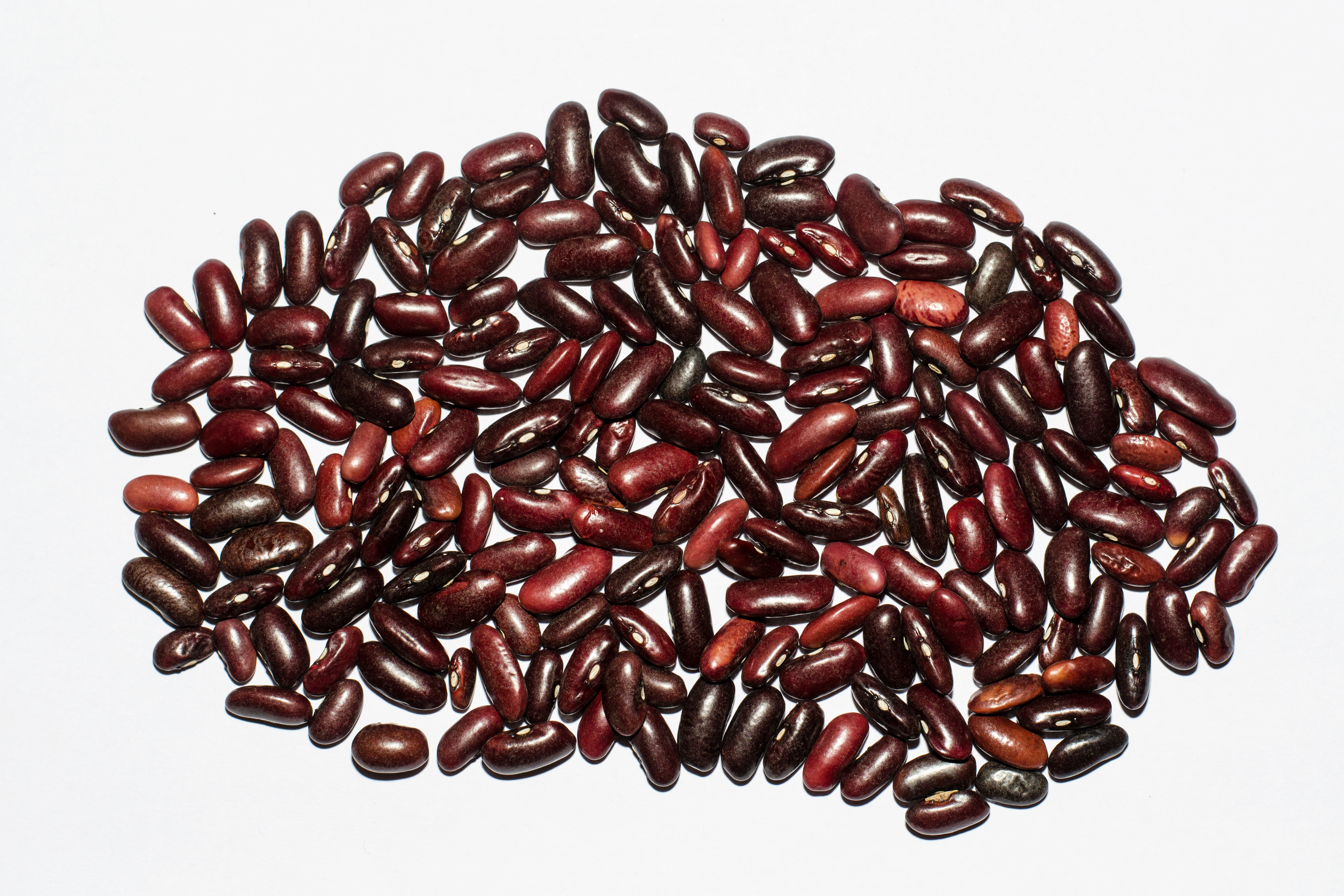
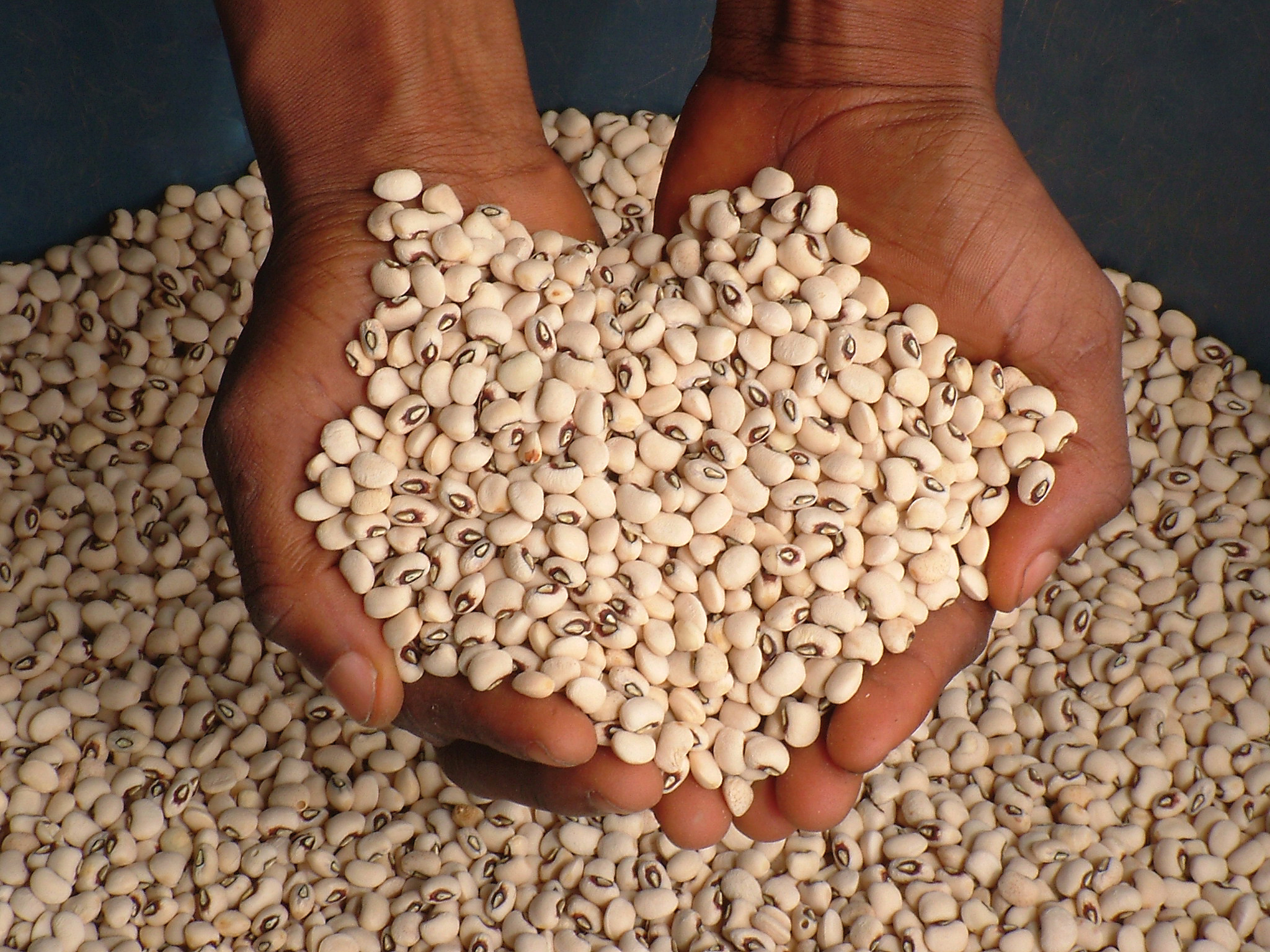
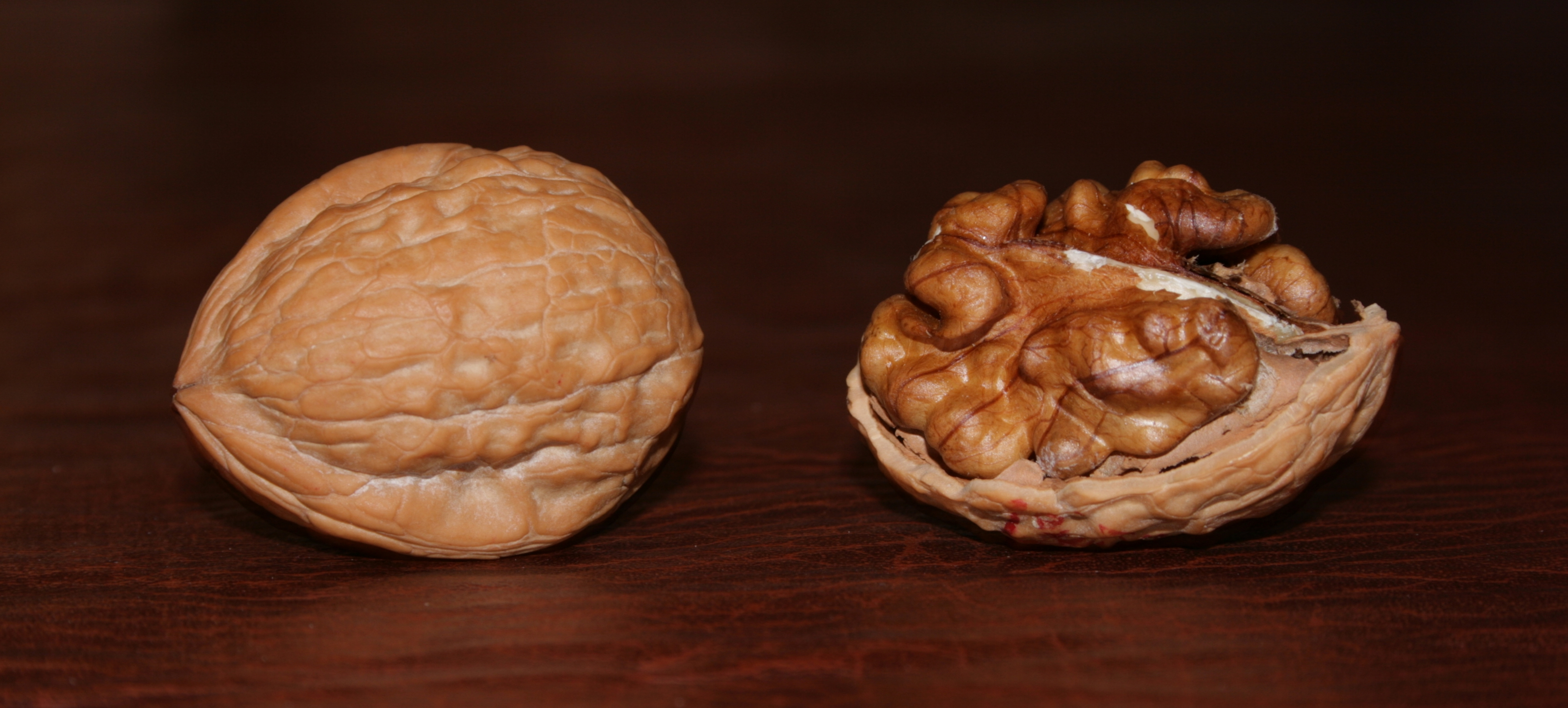
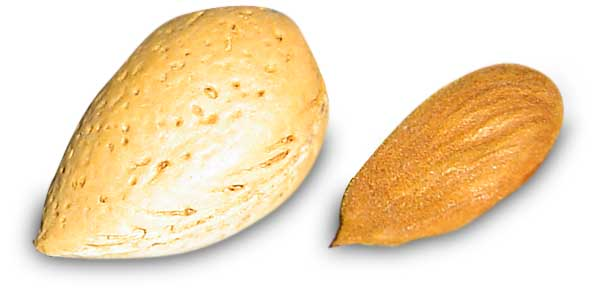
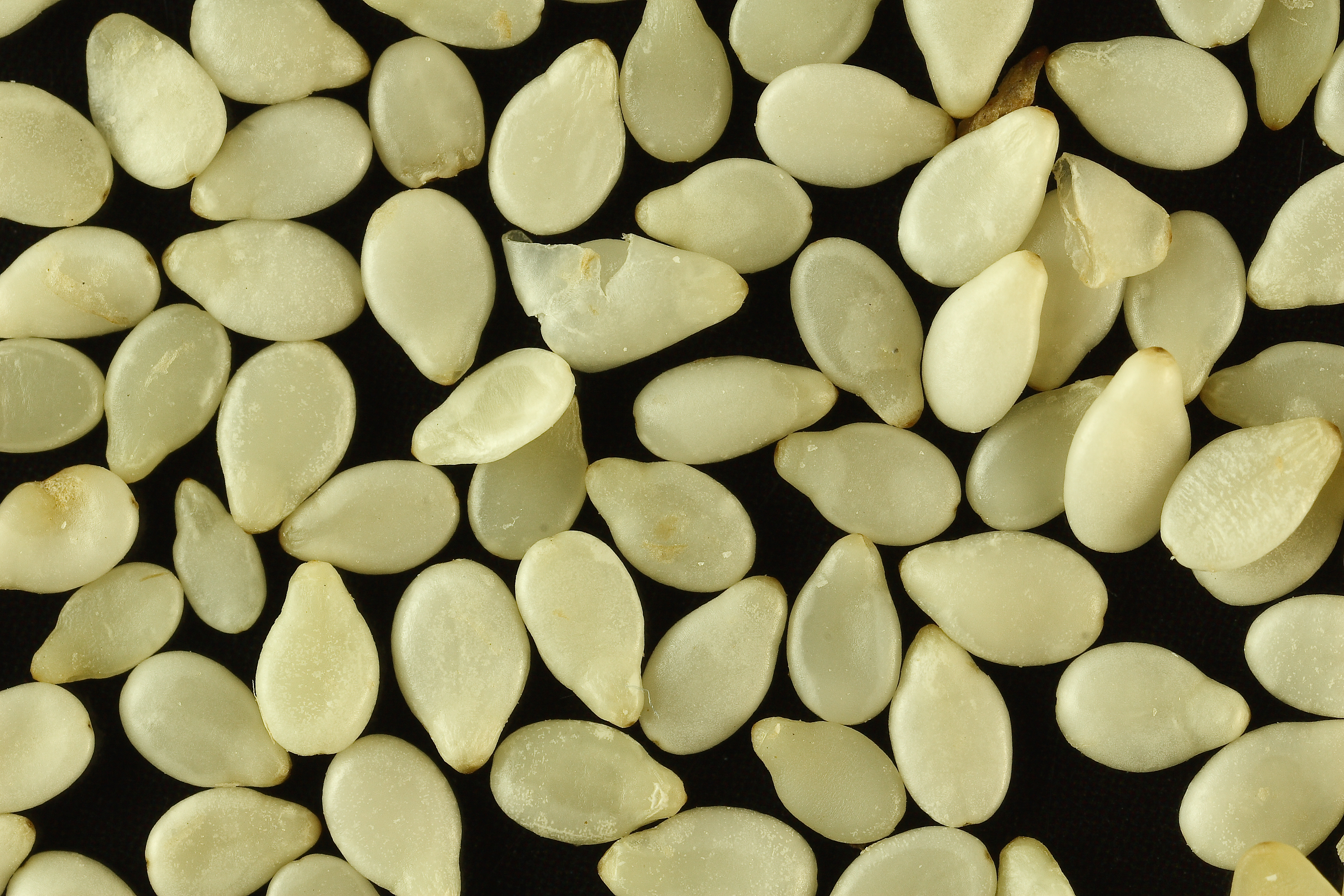
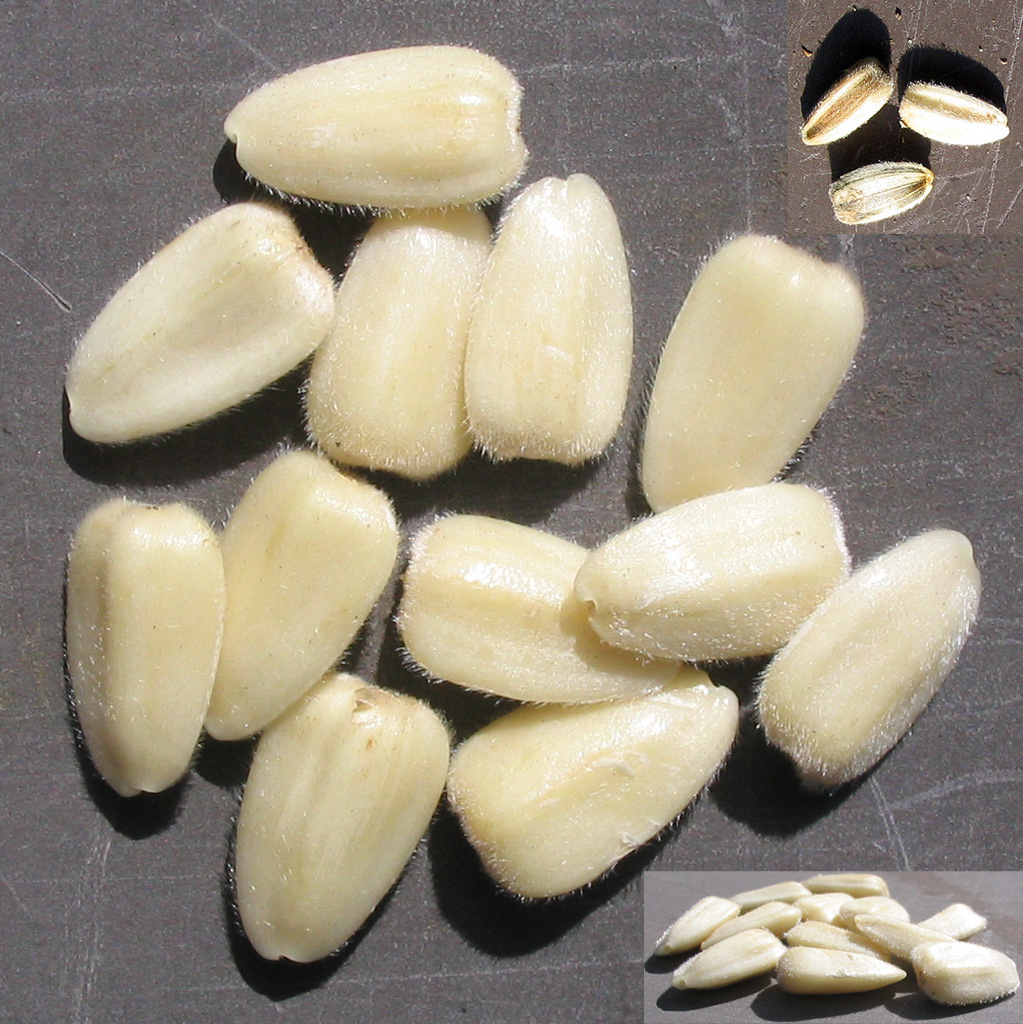
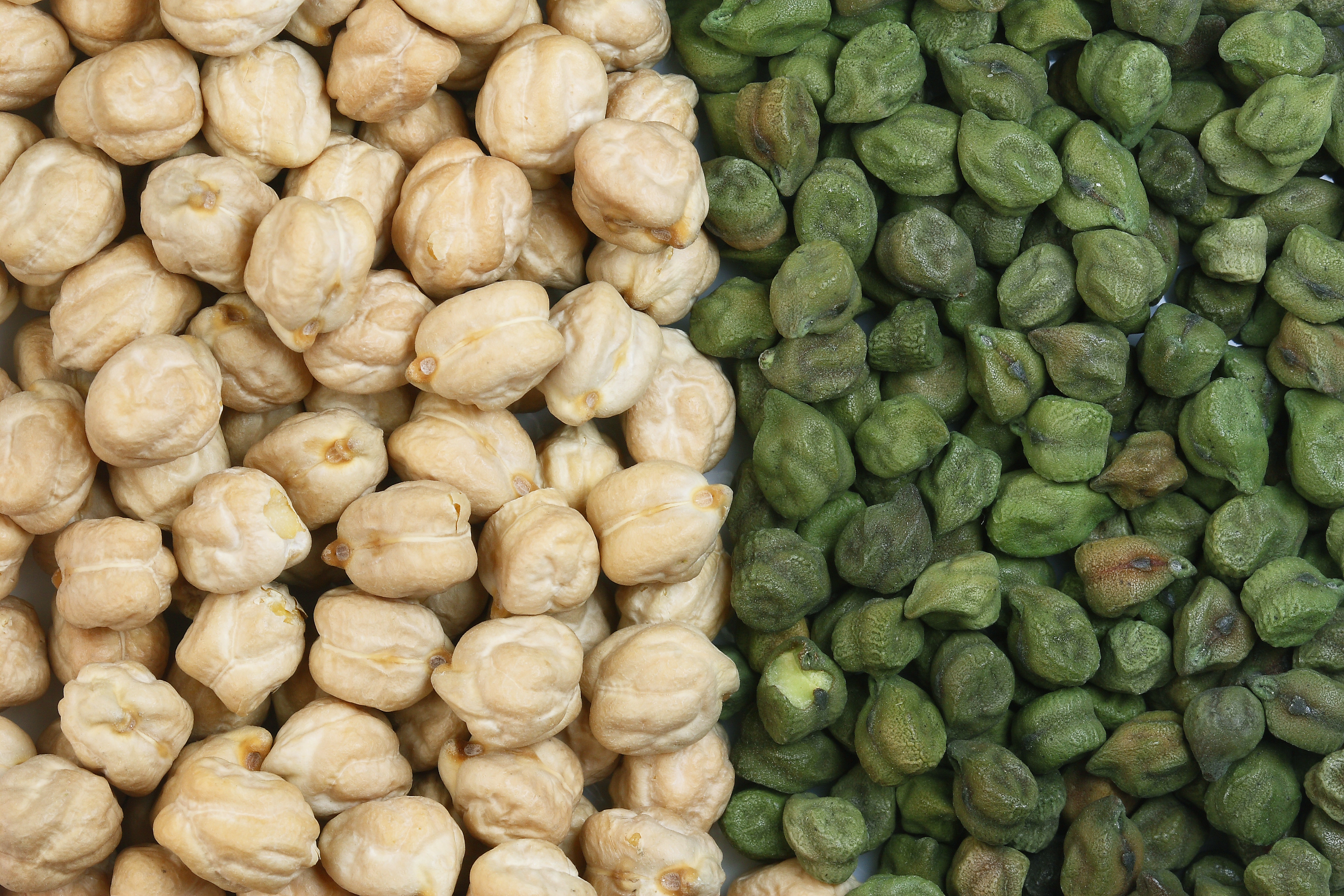
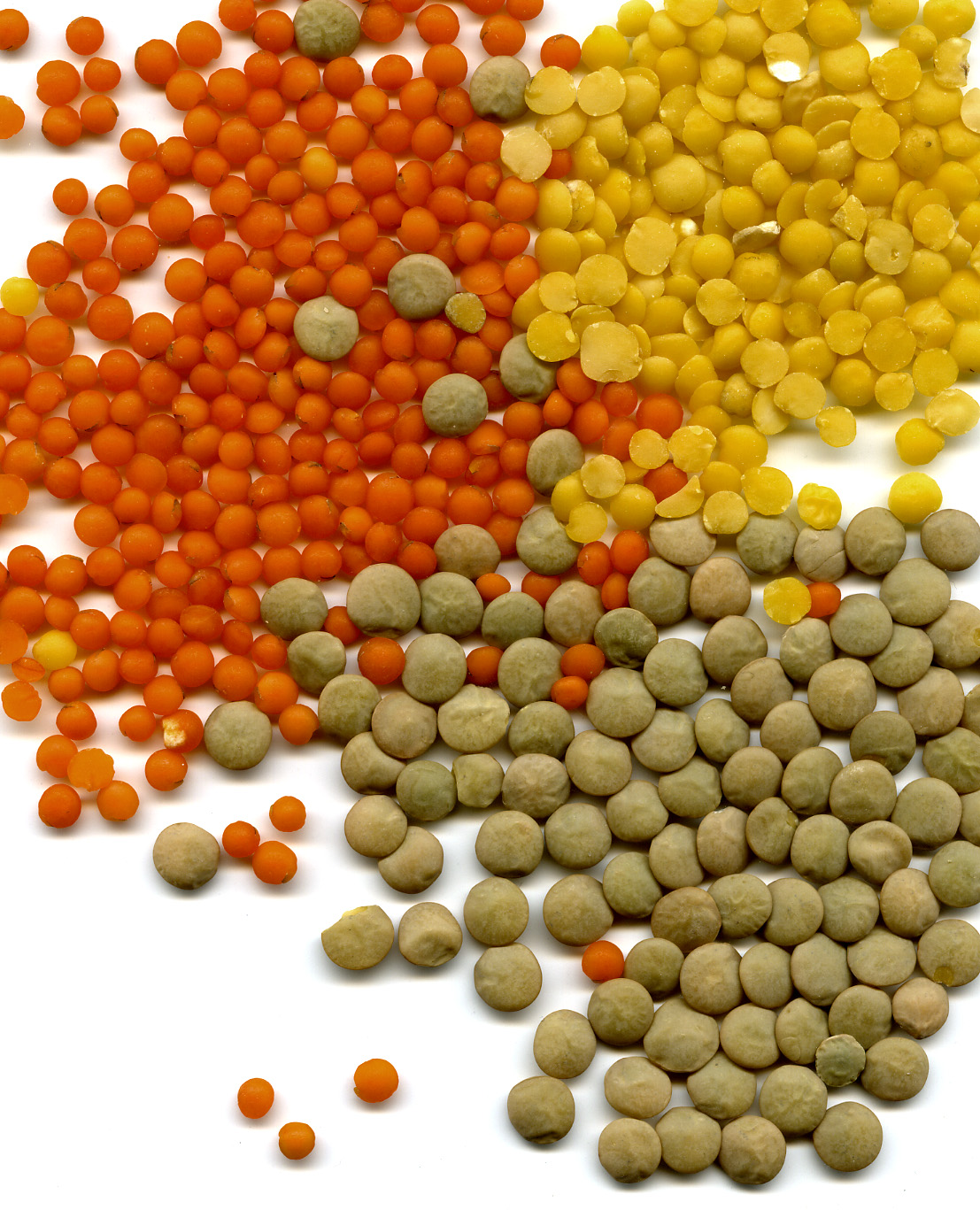
Plant sources of protein.

Plant sources of proteins include legumes, nuts, seeds, grains, and some vegetables and fruits. Plant foods with protein concentrations greater than 7% include (but are not limited to) soybeans, lentils, kidney beans, white beans, mung beans, chickpeas, cowpeas, lima beans, pigeon peas, lupines, wing beans, almonds, Brazil nuts, cashews, pecans, walnuts, cotton seeds, pumpkin seeds, hemp seeds, sesame seeds, and sunflower seeds.

Photovoltaic-driven microbial protein production uses electricity from solar panels and carbon dioxide from the air to create fuel for microbes, which are grown in bioreactor vats and then processed into dry protein powders. The process makes highly efficient use of land, water and fertiliser.

== Testing in foods ==
=== Nitrogen-based crude protein ===
The classic assays for protein concentration in food are the Kjeldahl method and the Dumas method. These tests determine the total nitrogen in a sample. The only major component of most food which contains nitrogen is protein (fat, carbohydrate and dietary fiber do not contain nitrogen). If the amount of nitrogen is multiplied by a factor depending on the kinds of protein expected in the food the total protein can be determined. This value is known as the "crude protein" content. The use of correct conversion factors is heavily debated, specifically with the introduction of more plant-derived protein products. However, on food labels the protein is calculated as the amount of nitrogen multiplied by 6.25, because the average nitrogen content of proteins is about 16%. The Kjeldahl test is typically used, because it is the method the AOAC International has adopted and is therefore used by many food standards agencies around the world, though the Dumas method is also approved by some standards organizations.

Nitrogen-based protein measurement cannot distinguish between true protein and non-protein nitrogen (NPN). NPN occurs in significant amounts in milk, edible insects, and fish. In addition, accidental contamination and intentional adulteration of protein meals with NPN sources that inflate crude protein content measurements have been known to occur in the food industry for decades. To ensure food quality, purchasers of protein meals routinely conduct quality control tests designed to detect the most common non-protein nitrogen contaminants, such as urea and ammonium nitrate.

The limitations of the Kjeldahl method were at the heart of the Chinese protein export contamination in 2007 and the 2008 China milk scandal in which the industrial chemical melamine was added to the milk or glutens to increase the measured "protein".

=== True protein ===
In at least one segment of the food industry, the dairy industry, some countries (at least the U.S., Australia, France and Hungary) have adopted "true protein" measurement, as opposed to crude protein measurement, as the standard for payment and testing: "True protein is a measure of only the proteins in milk, whereas crude protein is a measure of all sources of nitrogen and includes nonprotein nitrogen, such as urea, which has no food value to humans. ... Current milk-testing equipment measures peptide bonds, a direct measure of true protein." Measuring peptide bonds in grains has also been put into practice in several countries including Canada, the UK, Australia, Russia and Argentina where near-infrared reflectance (NIR) technology, a type of infrared spectroscopy is used.

The more traditional approach to true protein analysis is amino acid analysis. Data from such analysis has additional nutritional meaning, as humans and other animals have specific requirements for essential amino acids. The Food and Agriculture Organization of the United Nations (FAO) recommends that only amino acid analysis be used to determine protein in, inter alia, foods used as the sole source of nourishment, such as infant formula, but also provides: "When data on amino acids analyses are not available, determination of protein based on total N content by Kjeldahl (AOAC, 2000) or similar method ... is considered acceptable." Using standard methods for amino acid analysis, the true protein content can be reported as the sum of the anhydrous masses of all 18 amino acids analyzed. AA analysis can be performed using standard methods including ISO 13903 (2005) and AOAC 988.15.

In the context of dairy products, NPN can also be calculated by precipitating away all protein and measuring the nitrogen content in the remaining fraction.

=== Ruminant metabolizable protein ===
The testing method for protein in beef cattle feed has grown into a science over the post-war years. The standard text in the United States, Nutrient Requirements of Beef Cattle, has been through eight editions over at least seventy years. The 1996 sixth edition substituted for the fifth edition's crude protein the concept of "metabolizeable protein", which was defined around the year 2000 as "the true protein absorbed by the intestine, supplied by microbial protein and undegraded intake protein". (This refers specifically to ruminant nutrition, where microbes living in the rumen can convert NPNs to proteins. Such conversion does not happen in non-ruminants such as humans.)

=== Protein quality ===
The most important aspect and defining characteristic of protein from a nutritional standpoint is its amino acid composition. There are multiple systems which rate proteins by their usefulness to an organism based on their relative percentage of amino acids and, in some systems, the digestibility of the protein source. They include biological value, net protein utilization, and PDCAAS (Protein Digestibility Corrected Amino Acids Score) which was developed by the FDA as a modification of the Protein efficiency ratio (PER) method. The PDCAAS rating was adopted by the US Food and Drug Administration (FDA) and the Food and Agricultural Organization of the United Nations/World Health Organization (FAO/WHO) in 1993 as "the preferred 'best'" method to determine protein quality. These organizations have suggested that other methods for evaluating the quality of protein are inferior.

In 2013 FAO proposed changing to Digestible Indispensable Amino Acid Score.

== Digestion ==
Most proteins are decomposed to single amino acids by digestion in the gastro-intestinal tract.

Digestion typically begins in the stomach when pepsinogen is converted to pepsin by the action of hydrochloric acid, and continued by trypsin and chymotrypsin in the small intestine. Before the absorption in the small intestine, most proteins are already reduced to single amino acid or peptides of several amino acids. Most peptides longer than four amino acids are not absorbed. Absorption into the intestinal absorptive cells is not the end. There, most of the peptides are broken into single amino acids.

Absorption of the amino acids and their derivatives into which dietary protein is degraded is done by the gastrointestinal tract. The absorption rates of individual amino acids are highly dependent on the protein source; for example, the digestibilities of many amino acids in humans, the difference between soy and milk proteins and between individual milk proteins, beta-lactoglobulin and casein. For milk proteins, about 50% of the ingested protein is absorbed between the stomach and the jejunum and 90% is absorbed by the time the digested food reaches the ileum. Biological value (BV) is a measure of the proportion of absorbed protein from a food which becomes incorporated into the proteins of the organism's body.

=== Newborn ===
Newborns of mammals are exceptional in protein digestion and assimilation in that they can absorb intact proteins at the small intestine. This enables passive immunity, i.e., transfer of immunoglobulins from the mother to the newborn, via milk.

== Dietary requirements ==
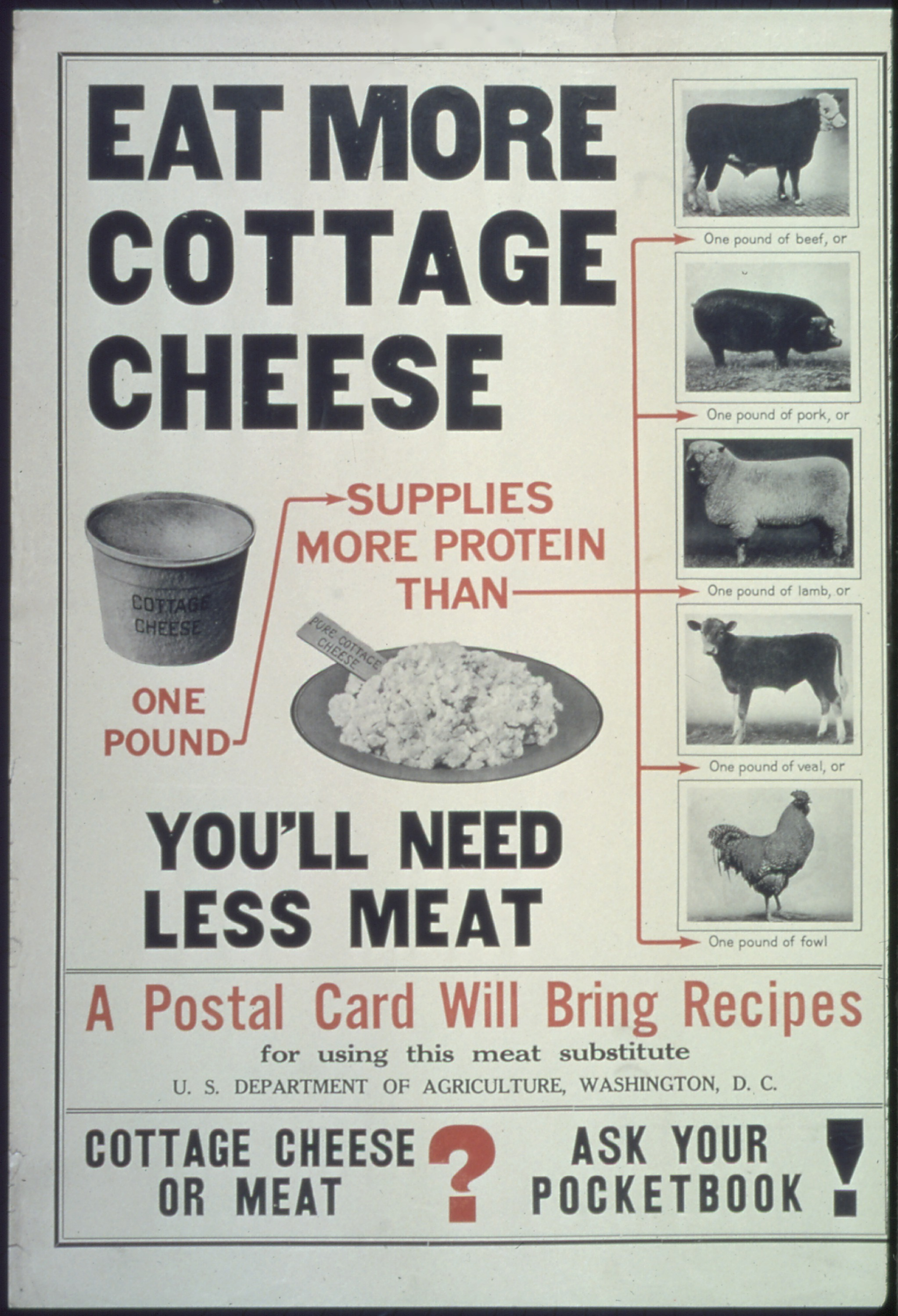
An education campaign launched by the United States Department of Agriculture in 1917, on cottage cheese as a lower-cost protein substitute for meat.

Average protein supply by region and origin

Considerable debate has taken place regarding protein intake requirements. The amount of protein required in a person's diet is determined in large part by overall energy intake, the body's need for nitrogen and essential amino acids, body weight and composition, rate of growth in the individual, physical activity level, the individual's energy and carbohydrate intake, and the presence of illness or injury. Physical activity and exertion as well as enhanced muscular mass increase the need for protein. Requirements are also greater during childhood for growth and development, during pregnancy, or when breastfeeding in order to nourish a baby or when the body needs to recover from malnutrition or trauma or after an operation.

The food industry has increased production of all sorts of protein products considerably, partly because of the spread of LP-1 weight-loss drugs. Whey, collagen and gelatin are being incorporated into foods and drinks along with milk-protein concentrates, soy and pea ingredients. This has reduced the price of cheese.

== Dietary recommendations ==
According to US & Canadian Dietary Reference Intake guidelines, women ages 19–70 need to consume 46 grams of protein per day while men ages 19–70 need to consume 56 grams of protein per day to minimize risk of deficiencies. These Recommended Dietary Allowances (RDAs) were calculated based on 0.8 grams protein per kilogram body weight and average body weights of 57 kg (126 pounds) and 70 kg (154 pounds), respectively. However, this recommendation is based on structural requirements only and disregards use of protein for energy metabolism. This requirement is for a normal sedentary person. In the United States, average protein consumption is higher than the RDA. According to results of the National Health and Nutrition Examination Survey (NHANES 2013–2014), average protein consumption for women ages 20 and older was 69.8 grams and for men 98.3 grams/day. According to research from Harvard University, the National Academy of Medicine suggests that adults should consume at least 0.8 grams of protein per kilogram of body weight daily, which is roughly equivalent to a little more than 7 grams for every 20 pounds of body weight. This recommendation is widely accepted by health professionals as a guideline for maintaining muscle mass, supporting metabolic functions, and promoting overall health.

=== Active people ===
Several studies have concluded that active people and athletes may require elevated protein intake (compared to 0.8 g/kg) due to increase in muscle mass and sweat losses, as well as need for body repair and energy source. Indeed, it has been shown that protein contribute around 3% of the total energy expenditure during exercise. Suggested amounts vary from 1.2 to 1.4 g/kg for those doing endurance exercise to as much as 1.6-1.8 g/kg for strength exercise and up to 2.0 g/kg/day for older people, while a proposed maximum daily protein intake would be approximately 25% of energy requirements i.e. approximately 2 to 2.5 g/kg. However, many questions still remain to be resolved.

In addition, some have suggested that athletes using restricted-calorie diets for weight loss should further increase their protein consumption, possibly to 1.8–2.0 g/kg, in order to avoid loss of lean muscle mass.

=== Aerobic exercise protein needs ===
Endurance athletes differ from strength-building athletes in that endurance athletes do not build as much muscle mass from training as strength-building athletes do. Research suggests that individuals performing endurance activity require more protein intake than sedentary individuals so that muscles broken down during endurance workouts can be repaired. Although the protein requirement for athletes still remains controversial (for instance see Lamont, Nutrition Research Reviews, pages 142 - 149, 2012), research does show that endurance athletes can benefit from increasing protein intake because the type of exercise endurance athletes participate in still alters the protein metabolism pathway. The overall protein requirement increases because of amino acid oxidation in endurance-trained athletes. Endurance athletes who exercise over a long period (2–5 hours per training session) use protein as a source of 5–10% of their total energy expended. Therefore, a slight increase in protein intake may be beneficial to endurance athletes by replacing the protein lost in energy expenditure and protein lost in repairing muscles. One review concluded that endurance athletes may increase daily protein intake to a maximum of 1.2–1.4 g per kg body weight.

=== Anaerobic exercise protein needs ===
Research also indicates that individuals performing strength training activity require more protein than sedentary individuals. Strength-training athletes may increase their daily protein intake to a maximum of 1.4–1.8 g per kg body weight to enhance muscle protein synthesis, or to make up for the loss of amino acid oxidation during exercise. Many athletes maintain a high-protein diet as part of their training. In fact, some athletes who specialize in anaerobic sports (e.g., weightlifting) believe a very high level of protein intake is necessary, and so consume high protein meals and also protein supplements.

=== Special populations ===
==== Protein allergies ====
A food allergy is an abnormal immune response to proteins in food. The signs and symptoms may range from mild to severe. They may include itchiness, swelling of the tongue, vomiting, diarrhea, hives, trouble breathing, or low blood pressure. These symptoms typically occurs within minutes to one hour after exposure. When the symptoms are severe, it is known as anaphylaxis. The following eight foods are responsible for about 90% of allergic reactions: cow's milk, eggs, wheat, shellfish, fish, peanuts, tree nuts and soy.

==== Chronic kidney disease ====
While there is no conclusive evidence that a high protein diet can cause chronic kidney disease, there is a consensus that people with this disease should decrease consumption of protein. According to one 2009 review updated in 2018, people with chronic kidney disease who reduce protein consumption have less likelihood of progressing to end stage kidney disease. Moreover, people with this disease while using a low protein diet (0.6 g/kg/d - 0.8 g/kg/d) may develop metabolic compensations that preserve kidney function, although in some people, malnutrition may occur.

==== Phenylketonuria ====
Individuals with phenylketonuria (PKU) must keep their intake of phenylalanine – an essential amino acid – extremely low to prevent a mental disability and other metabolic complications. Phenylalanine is a component of the artificial sweetener aspartame, so people with PKU need to avoid low calorie beverages and foods with this ingredient.

== Excess consumption ==
The U.S. and Canadian Dietary Reference Intake review for protein concluded that there was not sufficient evidence to establish a Tolerable upper intake level, i.e., an upper limit for how much protein can be safely consumed.

When amino acids are in excess of needs, the liver takes up the amino acids and deaminates them, a process converting the nitrogen from the amino acids into ammonia, further processed in the liver into urea via the urea cycle. Excretion of urea occurs via the kidneys. Other parts of the amino acid molecules can be converted into glucose and used for fuel. When food protein intake is periodically high or low, the body tries to keep protein levels at an equilibrium by using the "labile protein reserve" to compensate for daily variations in protein intake. However, unlike body fat as a reserve for future caloric needs, there is no protein storage for future needs.

Excessive protein intake may increase calcium excretion in urine, occurring to compensate for the pH imbalance from oxidation of sulfur amino acids. This may lead to a higher risk of kidney stone formation from calcium in the renal circulatory system. One meta-analysis reported no adverse effects of higher protein intakes on bone density. Another meta-analysis reported a small decrease in systolic and diastolic blood pressure with diets higher in protein, with no differences between animal and plant protein.

High protein diets have been shown to lead to an additional 1.21 kg of weight loss over a period of 3 months versus a baseline protein diet in a meta-analysis. Benefits of decreased body mass index as well as HDL cholesterol were more strongly observed in studies with only a slight increase in protein intake rather where high protein intake was classified as 45% of total energy intake. Detrimental effects to cardiovascular activity were not observed in short-term diets of 6 months or less. There is little consensus on the potentially detrimental effects to healthy individuals of a long-term high protein diet, leading to caution advisories about using high protein intake as a form of weight loss.

The 2015–2020 Dietary Guidelines for Americans (DGA) recommends that men and teenage boys increase their consumption of fruits, vegetables and other under-consumed foods, and that a means of accomplishing this would be to reduce overall intake of protein foods. The 2015–2020 DGA report does not set a recommended limit for the intake of red and processed meat. While the report acknowledges research showing that lower intake of red and processed meat is correlated with reduced risk of cardiovascular diseases in adults, it also notes the value of nutrients provided from these meats. The recommendation is not to limit intake of meats or protein, but rather to monitor and keep within daily limits the sodium (< 2300 mg), saturated fats (less than 10% of total calories per day), and added sugars (less than 10% of total calories per day) that may be increased as a result of consumption of certain meats and proteins. While the 2015 DGA report does advise for a reduced level of consumption of red and processed meats, the 2015–2020 DGA key recommendations recommend that a variety of protein foods be consumed, including both vegetarian and non-vegetarian sources of protein.

== Protein deficiency ==
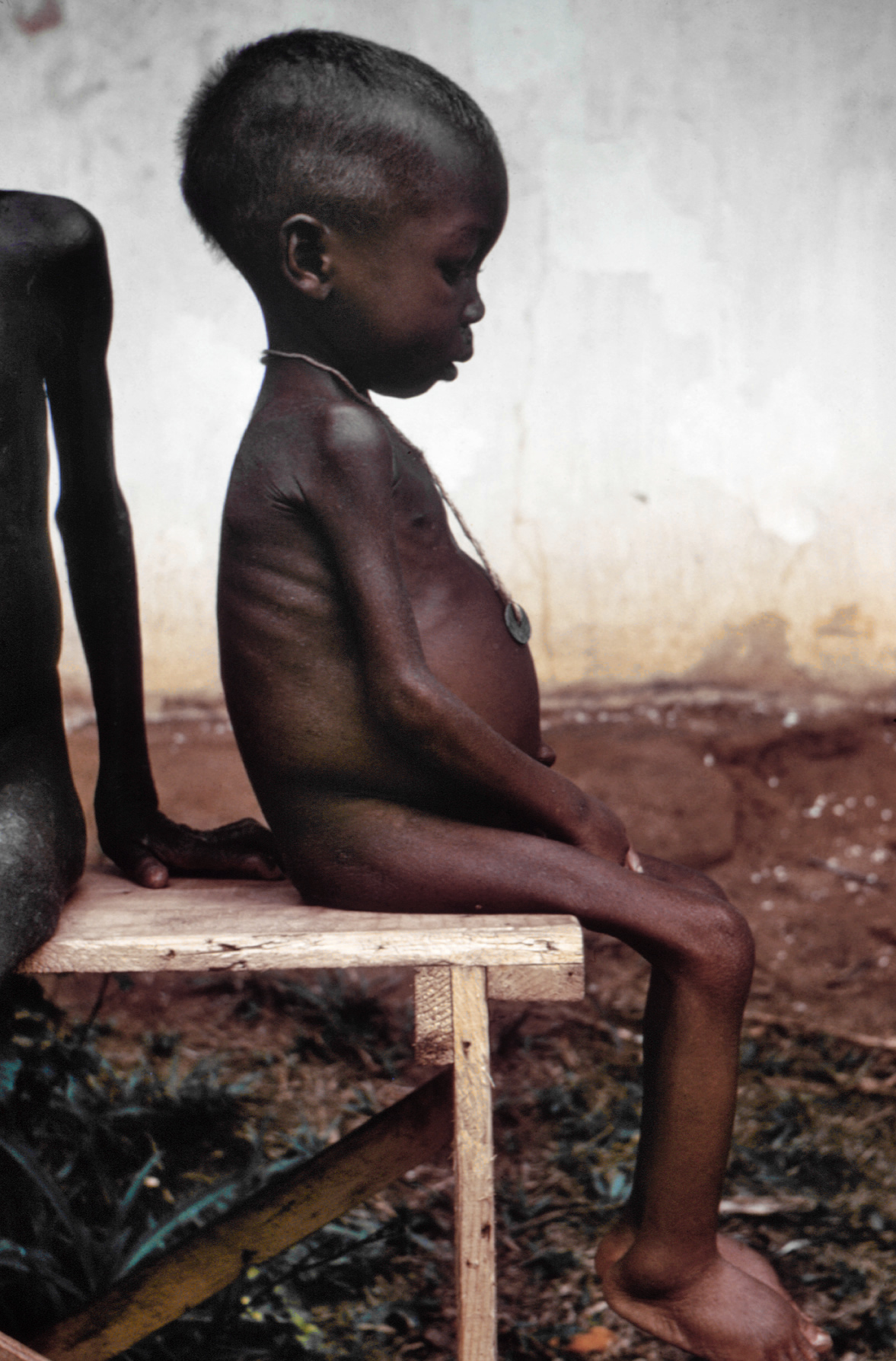
A child in Nigeria during the Biafra War with kwashiorkor – one of the three protein energy malnutrition ailments affecting over 10 million children in developing countries.

Protein deficiency and malnutrition (PEM) can lead to a variety of ailments, including intellectual disability and kwashiorkor. Symptoms of kwashiorkor include apathy, diarrhea, inactivity, failure to grow, flaky skin, fatty liver, and edema of the belly and legs. This edema is explained by the action of lipoxygenase on arachidonic acid to form leukotrienes and the normal functioning of proteins in fluid balance and lipoprotein transport.

PEM is fairly common worldwide in both children and adults and accounts for 6 million deaths annually. In the industrialized world, PEM is predominantly seen in hospitals, is associated with disease, or is often found in the elderly.

== See also ==
- Azotorrhea
- Biological value
- Bodybuilding supplement
- Leaf protein concentrate
- Low-protein diet
- Ninja diet
- Protein bar
- Protein toxicity
- Single-cell protein
