= Essential amino acids in plant food =

Natural sources of amino acids that cannot be synthesised by humans

Essential amino acids (EAAs) are amino acids that are necessary to build proteins in an organism. The source of complete EAAs are both animal and plant-based food.

== Essential amino acids in plant food ==
Essential amino acids (EAAs) are the amino acids required by an organism for building proteins but which cannot be synthesized by the organism itself. As such it is essential that these amino acids be supplied by the organism's diet. In case of humans there are 9 EAAs: histidine, isoleucine, leucine, lysine, methionine, phenylalanine, threonine, tryptophan, and valine.

EAAs are provided in both animal and plant-based food. The EAAs in plants vary greatly due to the vast variation in the plant world and, in general, plants have a lower content of proteins than animal food. All plant foods contain all EAAs, but some in very little amounts, e.g. some sprouts, mango, pineapple, lime and melon. On the other hand, nuts, seeds, beans and peas contain EAAs in significant quantity. The following table shows the composition of EAAs in selected plant foods as well as recommended dietary allowances.(RDA)

EAAs content in plant foods(mg/100g) in comparison to RDA(for a 70-kg man (mg)) and chicken breast.^{1}
	Histidine	Isoleucine	Leucine	Lysine	Methionine + Cysteine	Phenylalanine + Tyrosine	Threonine	Tryptophan	Valine	Total EAAs content
RDA	700	1400	2730	2100	1050	1750	1050	280	1820	12880
Chicken, breast, raw	839	1104	1861	2163	821	1718	1009	283	1165	10963
Soybeans, mature seeds, raw	1097	1971	3309	2706	1202	3661	1766	591	2029	18332
Cashew nuts, raw	456	789	1472	928	755	1459	688	287	1094	7928
Pumpkin and squash seed, roasted	770	1265	2388	1220	922	2790	985	569	1559	12468
Beans, white, mature seeds, raw	650	1031	1865	1603	605	1921	983	277	1222	10157
Peas, mature seeds, raw	586	983	1680	1771	468	1669	813	159	1035	9164
Quinoa, raw	407	504	840	766	512	860	421	167	594	5071
Wheat, durum	322	533	934	303	507	1038	366	176	594	4773
Rice, white, raw	153	281	538	235	286	565	233	75	397	2763
Tofu, raw, regular	221	435	713	452	137	787	402	120	446	3713
Seaweed, spirulina, dried	1080	3210	4950	3020	1812	5360	2970	929	3510	26841

^{1}Chicken was chosen as it is the most eaten animal food and it has one of the highest amount of EAAs among animal-based foods.

Soybeans have the highest content of EAAs among the foods. Spirulina is a superior supplement containing the highest amount of EAAs. Another important factor is the composition of EAAs. As we can see the quantity of some EAAs is lower. For example, pumpkin seeds despite high total EAAs content have a low content of lysine. A good indication is to calculate the food sample that meets the WHO's requirement of EAAs intake. A table below shows the smallest sample food required to provide all EAAs according to the RDA for each individual EAA.

Amounts of sample foods required to provide a minimum amount of each EAA to equal the RDA (for a 70-kg man)
Chicken	Soybeans	Cashew	Pumpkin seeds	Beans	Peas	Quinoa	Wheat	Rice	Tofu
156 g	90 g	226 g	172 g	173 g	224 g	325 g	693 g	893 g	766 g

Soybeans have the smallest sample food that provide complete protein, smaller than for several animal foods. Food samples for nuts, seeds, beans, and peas are bigger than one of chicken, and in case of rice, the sample is simply unpractical - the known fact is that cereals are not the main source of proteins.
