= Amino acid score =

Method used to determine if a protein is complete

Amino acids

Amino acid score is used to determine if a protein is complete. It is used along with the measure of protein digestibility that refers to how well a given protein is digested, to compare the proportion of essential amino acids found in one protein to the proportion in a "reference protein" considered to be complete.

== Methods of amino acid score calculation ==
PDCAAS and DIAAS are the two major protein standards which determine the completeness of proteins by their unique composition of essential amino acids.

=== Simple AAS, PDCAAS ===
PDCAAS considers digestibility and AAS separately. It has a single "reference protein" profile, in which the amounts in milligrams of each essential amino acid (EAA) in each gram of the reference protein is listed. To find the AAS given the amino acid profile of the test protein T_{i} and the amino acid profile of the reference protein R_{i}:

- For each essential amino acid i, calculate T_{i}/R_{i}.
- Take the amino acid with the smallest value of T_{i}/R_{i}. Call it l. This is the limiting amino acid.
- The AAS is 100% × T_{l}/R_{l}.

PDCAAS estimates digestibility in a separate procedure. The estimated PD is multiplied with AAS to get PDCAAS.

=== Digestibility-corrected AAS, DIAAS ===
DIAAS considers the profile of the essential amino acids that are actually absorbed. This value is calculated by estimating the amount of each EAA absorbed in the "test protein" by comparing how much of each EAA went into the mouth and how much was pumped out of the end of the small intestines. This was then turned into a profile A_{i} by dividing the amounts in milligrams of each EAA with the grams of the test protein eaten. From then on, the calculation is similar:

- For each essential amino acid i, calculate A_{i}/R_{i}.
- Take the amino acid with the smallest value of A_{i}/R_{i}. Call it l. This is the limiting amino acid taking actual absorption into account.
- The DIAAS is 100% × A_{l}/R_{l}.

DIAAS provides three separate R_{i} reference profiles for different human age groups.
