= Complete protein =

Protein source containing all nine essential amino acids

A complete protein or whole protein is a food source of protein that contains an adequate proportion of each of the nine essential amino acids necessary in the human diet.

== Concept ==
Protein nutrition is complex because any proteinogenic amino acid may be the limiting factor in metabolism. Mixing livestock feeds can optimize for growth, or minimize cost while maintaining adequate growth. Similarly, human nutrition is subject to Liebig's law of the minimum: The lowest level of one of the essential amino acids will be the limiting factor in metabolism.

If the content of a single indispensable amino acid in the diet is less than the individual's requirement, then it will limit the utilization of other amino acids and thus prevent the normal rates of synthesis even when the total nitrogen intake level is adequate. Thus the "limiting amino acid" will determine the nutritional value of the total nitrogen or protein in the diet.

Protein sources are thus rated by their limiting amino acids.

Most people eat a varied diet with multiple sources of protein. Incomplete sources can complement each other and become complete when combined. Combining does not need to happen for every single meal: so long as the diet is varied and meets caloric needs, even vegans and vegetarians – people who tend to have more "incomplete protein" in their diet – can easily meet their amino acid needs. In other words, most people do not need to consider the completeness of proteins of single foods.

== Amino acid profile ==
The following table lists the optimal profile of the nine essential amino acids in the human diet, which comprises complete protein, as recommended by the US Institute of Medicine's Food and Nutrition Board. The foodstuffs listed for comparison show the essential amino acid content per unit of the total protein of the food; 100g of spinach, for example, only contains 2.9g of protein (6% Daily Value), and of that protein 1.36% is tryptophan.^{(note that the examples have not been corrected for digestibility)}

Essential amino acid	mg/g of protein	percentage of total protein	raw, whole chicken egg	quinoa	raw spinach
Tryptophan	7	0.7%	1.33%	1%	1.36%
Threonine	27	2.7%	4.42%	3.2%	4.27%
Isoleucine	25	2.5%	5.34%	4.2%	5.14%
Leucine	55	5.5%	8.65%	7.3%	7.8%
Lysine	51	5.1%	7.27%	6.1%	6.08%
Methionine+Cystine	25	2.5%	5.18%	2.7%+1.3%	1.85%+1.22%
Phenylalanine+Tyrosine	47	4.7%	9.39%	4.3%+3.6%	4.51%+3.78%
Valine	32	3.2%	6.83%	5%	5.63%
Histidine	18	1.8%	2.45%	3.1%	2.24%
Total	287	28.7%	50.86%	41.8%	43.88%

=== Total adult daily intake ===
The second column in the following table shows the amino acid requirements of adults as recommended by the World Health Organization calculated for a 62 kg (137 lb) adult. Recommended Daily Intake is based on 2,000 kilocalories (8,400 kJ) per day, which could be appropriate for a 70 kg (150 lb) adult.

Essential amino acid	Required mg/day for a 62 kg (137 lb) adult
Tryptophan	248
Threonine	930
Isoleucine	1240
Leucine	2418
Lysine	1860
Methionine+Cystine	930
Phenylalanine+Tyrosine	1550
Valine	1612
Histidine	620
Total	11,408 milligrams (11.408 g)
Total Protein	46 to 56 grams (46,000 to 56,000 mg)

== See also ==
- Protein quality
- Protein Digestibility Corrected Amino Acid Score
