= List of foods by protein content =

Below is a list organised by food group and given in measurements of grams of protein per 100 grams of food portion. The reduction of water content has the greatest effect of increasing protein as a proportion of the overall mass of the food in question. Not all protein is equally digestible. Protein Digestibility Corrected Amino Acid Score (PDCAAS) is a method of evaluating the protein quality based on the amino acid requirements of humans.

== Meat and mock meat ==
(grams per 100 grams)

=== Common red meats ===
- Beef, cooked - 16.9 to 40.6
  - high scores: braised eye-of-round steak 40.62; broiled t-bone steak (porterhouse) 32.11; grilled lean steak 31.0
  - average score: baked lean (ground beef) 24.47
  - low score: corned beef: 16.91
- Lamb, cooked - 20.91 to 50.9
  - average score: grilled lean lamb chop 29.2

=== Less-common meat ===
- Bearded seal game meat, dried: 82.6
- Dog: 19.0
- Moose game meat, dried: 79.5
- Beaver game meat, broiled: 23.0
- Kangaroo: 21.4

=== White meat ===
- Chicken: 27 to 32
  - high score: grilled breast without skin 32
- Pork: 26 to 32
  - high score: grilled lean chop 31.6
- Fish 20.3 to 24.9
  - high score: grilled salmon 24.2 to 24.6; tuna canned in brine 23.5 to 24.9
  - medium score: baked cod 23.9
  - low score: farmed Atlantic salmon 20.4 (USDA); grilled mackerel 20.3 to 20.8; grilled cod 20.8
- Mock meat (cooked vegetarian preparations): 18.53 to 28.9
- Seafood 10.0 to 22.6
  - crab canned in brine 18.1
  - cooked mussels 16.7 to 17.7
  - cooked prawns 15.4 to 22.6
  - crabsticks 10.0

== Dairy ==
(grams per 100 grams)

=== Cheese ===
Protein (grams per 100g)
Cheese type	min.	max.
Gamalost	54	54
Parmesan	35	41.6
Cheddar (half-fat)	32.7	32.7
Gruyère	30	30
Edam	25	25
Cheddar (traditional)	24.9	27.2
Camembert	20	20
Cheddar (processed)	16.42	27.9
Feta	14.7	14.7
Ricotta	11.26	11.39
Cottage cheese	9.4	12.6

=== Milk and Yogurt ===
- Goat milk: 4.9 to 9.9
- Yogurt: 4.8 to 5.7
  - Whole milk yogurt 5.7
  - Plain Greek-style yogurt 5.7
  - Low-fat plain yogurt 4.8
- Cow milk (fluid, raw, pasteurized, whole, semi-skimmed, skimmed): 3.2 to 3.5

== Eggs ==
- Cooked chicken eggs: 10.62 to 14.1

== Vegetables, legumes, grains and nuts ==
(grams per 100 grams)

=== Vegetables ===
- Wolffia arrhiza, dry weight: 40
- boiled chia seeds: 16
- dried sheets of Nori seaweed: 5.81
- ready-to-eat starchy tubers: 0.87 to 6.17
  - high scores: home-prepared potato pancakes 6.17; French fries 3.18 to 4.03
  - average scores: baked potato 2.5; boiled yam 1.49
  - low scores: boiled sweet potato 1.6
- ready-to-eat green vegetables: 0.33 to 3.11

=== Legumes ===
- Boiled Black Beans: 9
- Soybean products: 5.1 to 13
  - Dry roasted soybeans 13
  - steamed Tofu 8.1
  - Soy milk 5.1 to 7.5
- Boiled black eyed peas: 8
- Pulses: 7.2 to 23
  - low scores: boiled lentils 9; boiled chickpeas 8.4 to 9; canned chickpeas 7.2; boiled red lentils 7.6
- Kidney beans: 6.9
- Baked beans: 5.0 to 5.2
- Boiled Green Peas: 5

=== Grains ===
- Wheat flour (brown): 12.2 to 12.6
- Oatmeal: 11.2
- Crackers: 7.43
- Bread: 6.7 to 11.4
  - Brown bread 7.9
  - White bread 7.9
- Pasta: 4.8 to 6.6
  - Fresh cooked pasta 6.6
  - Dried cooked pasta 4.8
- Rice: 2.6 to 10.9
  - Easy cook boiled rice 2.6 to 10.9
- Porridge oats: 3.0

=== Nuts ===
- (Raw, roasted, butter) peanuts: 23.68 to 28.04
- Almonds: 21.1
- Walnuts: 14.7
- Hazelnuts: 14.1
- Almond milk: 1

== Other food elements ==
Natural protein concentrates (often used in bodybuilding or as sports dietary supplements):

- Soy protein isolate (prepared with sodium or potassium): 80.66
- Whey protein isolate: 79
- Egg white, dried: 81.1
- Spirulina alga, dried: 57.45 (more often quoted as 55 to 77)
- Baker's yeast: 38.33
- Hemp husks 30

== Bibliography ==
- "Canadian Nutrient File". Health Canada. Archived from the original on 2008-12-26. - data computed from their database.
- "Protein content of some common foods found in the diet". British Nutrition Foundation. Archived from the original on 24 March 2021.
- "Protein In The Diet" (PDF). British Nutrition Foundation. Archived from the original (PDF) on 2025-07-13. - data transferred from this resource document.

== See also ==
- Biological value
