= William Cumming Rose =

American biochemist (1887–1985)

- Born: April 4, 1887; Greenville, South Carolina, U.S.
- Died: September 25, 1985 (aged 98); Urbana, Illinois, U.S.
- Education: Yale University
- Known for: Essential amino acids, Threonine
- Awards: Willard Gibbs Award (1952); National Medal of Science (1966)
- Scientific career
- Fields: Biochemistry, Nutrition

William Cumming Rose (April 4, 1887 – September 25, 1985) was an American biochemist and nutritionist. He discovered the amino acid threonine, and his research determined the necessity for essential amino acids in the diet and the minimum daily requirements of all amino acids for optimal growth.

== Early life ==
William Cumming Rose was born in Greenville, South Carolina. He attended various local schools, but his father John M. Rose, who was a Presbyterian minister, began to homeschool William in Latin, Greek, and Hebrew when he was 14 years old. He also studied an introductory chemistry textbook by Ira Remsen. When he was 16, he studied at Davidson College in North Carolina for his bachelor's degree. He took up graduate education at Yale University studying food chemistry with Russell Chittenden and Lafayette Mendel. He was granted a PhD in 1911.

== Career ==
Rose taught for a time at University of Pennsylvania with Alonzo E. Taylor. Taylor recommended him to University of Texas Galveston Medical School to organize a department of biochemistry. In 1922, he went to the University of Illinois as professor of physiological chemistry, a title which was changed to professor of biochemistry in 1936. From 1922 to 1955 he transformed his department into a center of excellence for the training of biochemists.

At Illinois, Rose focused his research work on amino acid metabolism and nutrition. He found that the 19 amino acids then known were not sufficient for growth, and this led to his discovery in 1935 of the last of the common amino acids, α-amino-β-hydroxy-n-butyric acid, later named threonine. His studies also distinguished the amino acids that are absolutely essential from those that are necessary only for optimal growth. His studies further led him to the point where it was "practicable to evaluate proteins in terms of their ability to meet human needs." In June 1949 he published "Amino Acid Requirements of Man".

Rose served as President of the American Society of Biological Chemists from 1939 to 1941. He was appointed to the Food and Nutrition Board of the National Research Council, which advised government agencies on dietary recommendations. Rose retired from the University of Illinois in 1955.

He recalled the role of Yale through the work of Samuel William Johnson, Chittenden, and Mendel in 1977 with the article "Recollections of personalities involved in the early history of American biochemistry". Further, he recounted the biochemical advances he witnessed in "How did it happen".

== Awards and honors ==
- 1936 – Became a member of the United States National Academy of Sciences
- 1939–1941 – President of the American Society of Biological Chemists
- 1945–1946 – President of the American Institute of Nutrition
- 1949 – Osborne and Mendel Award of the American Institute of Nutrition
- 1952 – Honorary Doctor of Sciences Degree from the University of Illinois
- 1952 – Willard Gibbs Medal of the American Chemical Society
- 1957 – Kenneth A. Spencer award of the American Chemical Society
- 1961 – Twentieth Anniversary Award of the Nutrition Foundation
- 1966 – Received National Medal of Science
- 1979 – William C. Rose Award initiated
