= Biological value =

Measure of nutritional protein use

Biological value (BV) is a measure of the proportion of absorbed protein from a food which becomes incorporated into the proteins of the organism's body. It captures how readily the digested protein can be used in protein synthesis in the cells of the organism. Proteins are the major source of nitrogen in food. BV assumes protein is the only source of nitrogen and measures the amount of nitrogen ingested in relation to the amount which is subsequently excreted. The remainder must have been incorporated into the proteins of the organisms body. A ratio of nitrogen incorporated into the body over nitrogen absorbed gives a measure of protein "usability" – the BV.

Unlike some measures of protein usability, biological value does not take into account how readily the protein can be digested and absorbed (largely by the small intestine). This is reflected in the experimental methods used to determine BV.

BV uses two similar scales:

1. The true percentage utilization (usually shown with a percent symbol).
2. The percentage utilization relative to a readily utilizable protein source, often egg (usually shown as unitless).

The two values will be similar but not identical.

The BV of a food varies greatly, and depends on a wide variety of factors. In particular the BV of a food varies depending on its preparation and the recent diet of the organism. This makes reliable determination of BV difficult and of limited use — fasting prior to testing is universally required in order to ascertain reliable figures.

BV is commonly used in nutrition science in many mammalian organisms, and is a relevant measure in humans. It is a popular guideline in bodybuilding in protein choice.

== Determination of BV ==
For accurate determination of BV:

1. the test organism must only consume the protein or mixture of proteins of interest (the test diet).
2. the test diet must contain no non-protein sources of nitrogen.
3. the test diet must be of suitable content and quantity to avoid use of the protein primarily as an energy source.

These conditions mean the tests are typically carried out over the course of over one week with strict diet control. Fasting prior to testing helps produce consistency between subjects (it removes recent diet as a variable).

There are two scales on which BV is measured; percentage utilization and relative utilization. By convention percentage BV has a percent sign (%) suffix and relative BV has no unit.

=== Percentage utilization ===
Biological value is determined based on this formula.

BV = ( N_{r} / N_{a} ) * 100

Where:

N_{a} = nitrogen absorbed in proteins on the test diet
N_{r} = nitrogen incorporated into the body on the test diet

However direct measurement of N_{r} is essentially impossible. It will typically be measured indirectly from nitrogen excretion in urine. Faecal excretion of nitrogen must also be taken into account - this part of the ingested protein is not absorbed by the body and so not included in the calculation of BV. An estimate is used of the amount of the urinary and faecal nitrogen excretion not coming from ingested nitrogen. This may be done by substituting a protein-free diet and observing nitrogen excretion in urine or faeces, but the accuracy of this method of estimation of the amount of nitrogen excretion not coming from ingested nitrogen on a protein-containing diet has been questioned.

BV = ( ( N_{i} - N_{e(f)} - N_{e(u)} ) / (N_{i} - N_{e(f)}) ) * 100

Where:

N_{i} = nitrogen intake in proteins on the test diet
N_{e(f)} = (nitrogen excreted in faeces whilst on the test diet) - (nitrogen excreted in faeces not from ingested nitrogen)
N_{e(u)} = (nitrogen excreted in urine whilst on the test diet) - (nitrogen excreted in urine not from ingested nitrogen)

Note:

N_{r} = N_{i} - N_{e(f)} - N_{e(u)}
N_{a} = N_{i} - N_{e(f)}

This can take any value from 0 to 100, though reported BV could be out of this range if the estimates of nitrogen excretion from non-ingested sources are inaccurate, such as could happen if the endogenous secretion changes with protein intake. A BV of 100% indicates complete utilization of a dietary protein, i.e. 100% of the protein ingested and absorbed is incorporated into proteins into the body. The value of 100% is an absolute maximum, no more than 100% of the protein ingested can be utilized (in the equation above N_{e(u)} and N_{e(f)} cannot go negative, setting 100% as the maximum BV).

=== Relative utilization ===
Due to experimental limitations BV is often measured relative to an easily utilizable protein. Normally egg protein is assumed to be the most readily utilizable protein and given a BV of 100. For example:

Two tests of BV are carried out on the same person; one with the test protein source and one with a reference protein (egg protein).

relative BV = ( BV_{(test)} / BV_{(egg)} ) * 100

Where:

BV_{(test)} = percentage BV of the test diet for that individual
BV_{(egg)} = percentage BV of the reference (egg) diet for that individual

This is not restricted to values of less than 100. The percentage BV of egg protein is only 93.7% which allows other proteins with true percentage BV between 93.7% and 100% to take a relative BV of over 100. For example, whey protein takes a relative BV of 104, while its percentage BV is under 100%.

The principal advantage of measuring BV relative to another protein diet is accuracy; it helps account for some of the metabolic variability between individuals. In a simplistic sense the egg diet is testing the maximum efficiency the individual can take up protein, the BV is then provided as a percentage taking this as the maximum.

=== Conversion ===
Providing it is known which protein measurements were made relative to it is simple to convert from relative BV to percentage BV:

BV_{(relative)} = ( BV_{(percentage)} / BV_{(reference)} ) * 100
BV_{(percentage)} = ( BV_{(relative)} / 100 ) * BV_{(reference)}

Where:

BV_{(relative)} = relative BV of the test protein
BV_{(reference)} = percentage BV of reference protein (typically egg: 93.7%).
BV_{(percentage)} = percentage BV of the test protein

While this conversion is simple it is not strictly valid due to the differences between the experimental methods. It is, however, suitable for use as a guideline.

== Factors that affect BV ==
The determination of BV is carefully designed to accurately measure some aspects of protein usage whilst eliminating variation from other aspects. When using the test (or considering BV values) care must be taken to ensure the variable of interest is quantified by BV. Factors which affect BV can be grouped into properties of the protein source and properties of the species or individual consuming the protein.

=== Properties of the protein source ===
Three major properties of a protein source affect its BV:

- Amino acid composition, and the limiting amino acid, which is usually lysine
- Preparation (cooking)
- Vitamin and mineral content

Amino acid composition is the principal effect. All proteins are made up of combinations of the 21 biological amino acids. Some of these can be synthesised or converted in the body, whereas others cannot and must be ingested in the diet. These are known as essential amino acids (EAAs), of which there are 9 in humans. The number of EAAs varies according to species (see below).

EAAs missing from the diet prevent the synthesis of proteins that require them. If a protein source is missing critical EAAs, then its biological value will be low as the missing EAAs form a bottleneck in protein synthesis. For example, if a hypothetical muscle protein requires phenylalanine (an essential amino acid), then this must be provided in the diet for the muscle protein to be produced. If the current protein source in the diet has no phenylalanine in it the muscle protein cannot be produced, giving a low usability and BV of the protein source.

In a related way if amino acids are missing from the protein source which are particularly slow or energy consuming to synthesise this can result in a low BV.

Methods of food preparation also affect the availability of amino acids in a food source. Some of food preparation may damage or destroy some EAAs, reducing the BV of the protein source.

Many vitamins and minerals are vital for the correct function of cells in the test organism. If critical minerals or vitamins are missing from the protein source this can result in a massively lowered BV. Many BV tests artificially add vitamins and minerals (for example in yeast extract) to prevent this.

=== Properties of the test species or individual ===
==== Under test conditions ====
Variations in BV under test conditions are dominated by the metabolism of the individuals or species being tested. In particular differences in the essential amino acids (EAAs) species to species has a significant effect, although even minor variations in amino acid metabolism individual to individual have a large effect.

The fine dependence on the individual's metabolism makes measurement of BV a vital tool in diagnosing some metabolic diseases.

==== In everyday life ====
The principal effect on BV in everyday life is the organism's current diet, although many other factors such as age, health, weight, sex, etc. all have an effect. In short any condition which can affect the organism's metabolism will vary the BV of a protein source.

In particular, whilst on a high protein diet the BV of all foods consumed is reduced — the limiting rate at which the amino acids may be incorporated into the body is not the availability of amino acids but the rate of protein synthesis possible in cells. This is a major point of criticism of BV as a test; the test diet is artificially protein rich and may have unusual effects.

=== Factors with no effect ===
BV is designed to ignore variation in digestibility of a food — which in turn largely depends on the food preparation. For example, compare raw soy beans and extracted soy bean protein. The raw soy beans, with tough cell walls protecting the protein, have a far lower digestibility than the purified, unprotected, soy bean protein extract. As a foodstuff far more protein can be absorbed from the extract than the raw beans, however the BV will be the same.

The exclusion of digestibility is a point of misunderstanding and leads to misrepresentation of the meaning of a high or low BV.

== Advantages and disadvantages ==
BV provides a good measure of the usability of proteins in a diet and also plays a valuable role in detection of some metabolic diseases. BV is, however, a scientific variable determined under very strict and unnatural conditions. It is not a test designed to evaluate the usability of proteins whilst an organism is in everyday life — indeed the BV of a diet will vary greatly depending on age, weight, health, sex, recent diet, current metabolism, etc. of the organism. In addition BV of the same food varies significantly species to species. Given these limitations BV is still relevant to everyday diet to some extent. No matter the individual or their conditions a protein source with high BV, such as egg, will always be more easily used than a protein source with low BV.

=== In comparison to other methods known ===
There are many other major methods of determining how readily used a protein is, including:

- Net protein Utilization (NPU)
- Protein Efficiency Ratio (PER)
- Nitrogen Balance (NB)
- Protein digestibility (PD)
- Protein Digestibility Corrected Amino Acid Score (PDCAAS)
- Digestible Indispensable Amino Acid Score (DIAAS)

These all hold specific advantages and disadvantages over BV, although in the past BV has been held in high regard.

== In animals ==
The Biological Value method is also used for analysis in animals such as cattle, poultry, and various laboratory animals such as rats. It was used by the poultry industry to determine which mixtures of feed were utilized most efficiently by developing chicken. Although the process remains the same, the biological values of particular proteins in humans differs from their biological values in animals due to physiological variations.

== Typical values ==
Common foodstuffs and their values: (Note: this scale uses 100 as 100% of the nitrogen incorporated.)

- Whey Protein: 96
- Whole Soy Bean: 96
- Human milk: 95
- Chicken egg: 94
- Soybean milk: 91
- Buckwheat: 90+
- Cow milk: 90
- Cheese: 84
- Quinoa: 83
- Rice: 83
- Defatted soy flour: 81
- Fish: 76
- Beef: 74
- Immature bean: 65
- Full-fat soy flour: 64
- Soybean curd (tofu): 64
- Whole wheat: 64
- White flour: 41

Common foodstuffs and their values: (Note: These values use "whole egg" as a value of 100, so foodstuffs that provide even more nitrogen than whole eggs, can have a value of more than 100. 100, does not mean that 100% of the nitrogen in the food is incorporated into the body, and not excreted, as in other charts.)

- Whey protein concentrate: 104
- Whole egg: 100
- Cow milk: 91
- Beef: 80
- Casein: 77
- Soy: 74
- Wheat gluten: 64

By combining different foods it is possible to maximize the score, because the different components favor each other:

- 85 % rice and 15 % yeast: 118
- 55 % soy and 45 % rice: 111
- 55 % potatoes and 45 % soy: 103
- 52 % beans and 48 % corn: 101

== Criticism ==
Since the method measures only the amount that is retained in the body critics have pointed out what they perceive as a weakness of the biological value methodology. Critics have pointed to research that indicates that because whey protein isolate is digested so quickly it may in fact enter the bloodstream and be converted into carbohydrates through a process called gluconeogenesis much more rapidly than was previously thought possible, so while amino acid concentrations increased with whey it was discovered that oxidation rates also increased and a steady-state metabolism, a process where there is no change in overall protein balance, is created. They claim that when the human body consumes whey protein it is absorbed so rapidly that most of it is sent to the liver for oxidation. Hence they believe the reason so much is retained is that it is used for energy production, not protein synthesis. This would bring into question whether the method defines which proteins are more biologically utilizable.

A further critique published in the Journal of Sports Science and Medicine states that the BV of a protein does not take into consideration several key factors that influence the digestion and interaction of protein with other foods before absorption, and that it only measures a protein's maximal potential quality and not its estimate at requirement levels. Also, the study by Poullain et al., which is often cited to demonstrate the superiority of whey protein hydrolysate by marketers, measured nitrogen balance in rats after three days of starvation, which corresponds to a longer period in humans. The study found that whey protein hydrolysate led to better nitrogen retention and growth than the other proteins studied. However the study's flaw is in the BV method used, as starvation affects how well the body will store incoming protein (as does a very high caloric intake), leading to falsely elevated BV measures.

So, the BV of a protein is related to the amount of protein given. BV is measured at levels below the maintenance level. This means that as protein intake goes up, the BV of that protein goes down. For example, milk protein shows a BV near 100 at intakes of 0.2 g/kg. As protein intake increases to roughly maintenance levels, 0.5 g/kg, BV drops to around 70. Pellet et al., concluded that "biological measures of protein quality conducted at suboptimal levels in either experimental animals or human subjects may overestimate protein value at maintenance levels." As a result, while BV may be important for rating proteins where intake is below requirements, it has little bearing on individuals with protein intakes far above requirements.

This flaw is supported by the FAO/WHO/UNU, who state that BV and NPU are measured when the protein content of the diet is clearly below that of requirement, deliberately done to maximize existing differences in quality as inadequate energy intake lowers the efficiency of protein utilization and in most N balance studies, calorie adequacy is ensured. And because no population derives all of its protein exclusively from a single food, the determination of BV of a single protein is of limited use for application to human protein requirements.

Another limitation of the use of Biological Value as a measure of protein quality is that proteins which are completely devoid of one essential amino acid (EAA) can still have a BV of up to 40. This is because of the ability of organisms to conserve and recycle EAAs as an adaptation of inadequate intake of the amino acid.

Lastly, the use of rats for the determination of protein quality is not ideal. Rats differ from humans in requirements of essential amino acids. This has led to a general criticism that experiments on rats lead to an over-estimation of the BV of high-quality proteins to man because human requirements of essential amino acids are much lower than those for rats (as rats grow at a much faster rate than humans). Also, because of their fur, rats are assumed to have relatively high requirements of sulphur-containing amino acids (methionine and cysteine).

As a result, the analytical method that is universally recognized by the Food and Agriculture Organization (FAO), World Health Organization (WHO), the U.S. Food and Drug Administration (FDA), the United States Department of Agriculture (USDA), United Nations University (UNU) and the United States National Academy of Sciences when judging the quality of protein in the human is not PER or BV but the Protein Digestibility Corrected Amino Acid Score (PDCAAS), as it is viewed as accurately measuring the correct relative nutritional value of animal and vegetable sources of protein in the diet.

== See also ==
- List of foods by protein content
