= Azotorrhea =

Excessive nitrogen in feces or urine

Azotorrhea is the excessive discharge of nitrogenous substances in the feces or urine. As in when people eat a diet high in protein they may suffer from increased amount of amino acid byproduct (nitrogen) being broken and excreted through defecation or urination.
