= Protein efficiency ratio =

Method of evaluating a protein's quality

Protein efficiency ratio (PER) is based on the weight gain of a test subject divided by its intake of a particular food protein during the test period.

From 1919 until very recently, the PER had been a widely used method for evaluating the quality of protein in food.

The food industry in Canada currently uses the PER as the standard for evaluating the protein quality of foods. The official method for determining the protein efficiency ratio is from Health Canada's Health Protection Branch Method FO-1, October 15, 1981.

The U.S. Food and Drug Administration now uses the Protein Digestibility Corrected Amino Acid Score (PDCAAS) as the basis for the percent of the U.S. recommended daily allowance (USRDA) for protein shown on food labels. However, the PER is still used in certain FDA regulations. The US FDA official methods to calculate the PER are as stated in the Official Methods of Analysis of AOAC International, 16th ed. (1995) Section 45.3.05, AOAC Official Method 982.30 Protein Efficiency Ratio Calculation Method; and Official Methods of Analysis of AOAC International, 18th ed. (2005).

$PER \,= \frac{Gain\ in\ body\ mass(g)}{Protein\ intake (g)}$

== See also ==
- Protein (nutrient)
- Protein Digestibility Corrected Amino Acid Score (PDCAAS)
- Net protein utilization
- Nitrogen balance
- Biological value
