= Digestible Indispensable Amino Acid Score =

Protein quality method

Digestible Indispensable Amino Acid Score (DIAAS) is a protein quality method proposed in March 2013 by the Food and Agriculture Organization to replace the current protein ranking standard, the Protein Digestibility Corrected Amino Acid Score (PDCAAS).

The DIAAS accounts for amino acid digestibility at the end of the small intestine (= the end of ileum, the last section of the small intestine), providing a more accurate measure of the amounts of amino acids absorbed by the body and the protein's contribution to human amino acid and nitrogen requirements. This is in contrast to the PDCAAS, which is based on an estimate of total protein digestibility over the total digestive tract. Values stated using PDCAAS generally overestimate the amount of amino acids absorbed.

== Calculation ==
As noted before, DIAAS considers the digestibility of individual essential amino acids (EAAs). The amounts of each amino acid in the test food and in the digested mixture at the end of the small intestine is subtracted to give the absorbed amount of each EAA a_{i}. The value is divided by the total amount of protein in the test food to give the milligrams of each EAA absorbed for each gram of the protein A_{i}. One then looks up the desired reference pattern, which gives the amount of an EAA in 1 gram of the "reference protein" R_{i}. For each EAA, the "reference ratio" A_{i}/R_{i} is calculated. The final DIAAS is 100% times the lowest reference ratio.

Amino acid digestibility is preferably scored using humans. If humans are not available, determination in growing pigs or growing rats are acceptable. For measurement in humans, a minimally invasive dual-tracer method has been developed for the DIAAS method.

== Reference pattern ==
Amino acid requirements were determined in two parts. The amino acid distribution of breast milk was used for the 0 to 6 month age range, and existing amino acid data was used for older ages after adjustment for digestibility. The reference amino acid requirements are presented below.

	Requirements by age (mg/g protein)		
Amino acid	0 to 6 months	6 months to 3 years	Over 3 years
Histidine	21	20	16
Isoleucine	55	32	30
Leucine	96	66	61
Lysine	69	57	48
Methionine + Cysteine (SAA)	33	27	23
Phenylalanine + Tyrosine (AAA)	94	52	41
Threonine	44	31	25
Tryptophan	17	8.5	6.6
Valine	55	43	40

== Example values ==
The table shows the ratings of selected foods comparing PDCAAS to DIAAS. The quality of various sources of protein depends on how it is processed, refined, stored, or cooked. (preparation is unspecified for some values in the table, but does not necessarily differ in preparation from the foods where preparation is specified). A major difference between DIAAS and PDCAAS, is that PDCAAS is truncated at 100%, while DIAAS is not. Multiple protein sources can also be combined to increase DIAAS, which can be effective at raising the max DIAAS of plant-based diets.

When attempting to read the results the score refers to how much of each required protein is available to absorb in reference to how much is required per day.

Food	PDCAAS	DIAAS for 0.5-3 yo	Limiting AA
Milk Protein Concentrate	1.00	1.18	Met + Cys
Whey Protein Isolate	1.00	1.09	Val
Soy Protein Isolate	0.98	0.898	Met + Cys
Pea Protein Concentrate	0.893	0.822	Met + Cys
Rice Protein Concentrate	0.419	0.371	Lys
Whole milk powder	1.000	1.159	
Tilapia		1.00	
Tuna (canned in oil)	1.00		
Chicken breast	1.00	1.08	Trp
Pork		1.17	
Beef	1.000	1.116	
Whole milk	1.00	1.14	Met + Cys
Egg (hard boiled)	1.00	1.13	His
Egg		1.01	
Chickpeas	0.74	0.83	Met + Cys
Tofu	0.70	0.97	Met + Cys
Peas	0.782	0.647	
Cooked peas	0.597	0.579	Met + Cys
Soybean	1.000	0.996	
Soy		0.91	Met + Cys
Soya Flour	1.00	1.05	
Fava Bean		0.55	Met + Cys
Cooked kidney beans	0.648	0.588	
Roasted peanuts	0.509	0.434	
Almonds	0.39	0.40	Lys
Wheat	0.463	0.40-0.48	Lys
Wheat flour	0.40		
Wheat bran	0.53-0.60	0.41-0.49	
Barley	0.591	0.472	
Rye	0.553	0.476	
Triticale	0.553	0.498	
Corn	0.37	0.36	Lys
Corn Grain	0.473	0.424	
Corn-based cereal	0.078	0.012	Lys
Rice		0.47	Lys
Cooked rice	0.616	0.595	Lys
Oats		0.57	Lys
Cooked rolled oats	0.670	0.542	
Potato Protein Isolate	0.99	1.00	
Quinoa	0.677		
Quinoa flour	0.79		
Gelatin		0.02	Trp
Wheat/potato (30/70)		1.00	
Vegetables	0.73-0.89		
Tubercles	0.74-0.89		
Fresh Fruits	0.64-0.76		
Dried Fruits	0.48-0.66		
Legumes	0.70-0.89		

== Comparing DIAAS to PDCAAS ==
- The PDCAAS uses the faecal digestibility while the DIAAS considers the ileal digestibility.
- The PDCAAS is truncated at 100% while DIAAS is not
- The PDCAAS experimentation protocol that determines the digestibility involves rats while the DIAAS advises to use pigs preferably as the pig digestive system is closer to the human's system.
- The PDCAAS considers the global digestibility of the product's protein (a single figure) while the DIAAS accounts for a specific digestibility percentage for each indispensable amino acid
- The reference values for the PDCAAS are based on a unique age group, the 2 to 5-year-old child which is deemed to be the more demanding. The DIAAS provides values for three different age groups, with more up to date data about human needs.

== See also ==
- Amino acid score
- Protein Digestibility Corrected Amino Acid Score
- Protein quality
- Net protein utilization
- Nitrogen balance
