= Net protein utilization =

Percentage of ingested nitrogen that is retained in the body

The net protein utilization (NPU) is the percentage of ingested nitrogen that is retained in the body.

== Rating ==
It is used to determine the nutritional efficiency of protein in the diet, that is, it is used as a measure of "protein quality" for human nutritional purposes.

As a value, NPU can range from 0 to 1 (or 100), with a value of 1 (or 100) indicating 100% utilization of dietary nitrogen as protein and a value of 0 an indication that none of the nitrogen supplied was converted to protein.

Certain foodstuffs, such as eggs or milk, rate as 1 on an NPU chart.

Experimentally, this value can be determined by determining dietary protein intake and then measuring nitrogen excretion. One formula for apparent NPU is:

NPU = {0.16 × (24 hour protein intake in grams)} - {(24 hour urinary urea nitrogen) + 2} - {0.1 × (ideal body weight in kilograms)} / {0.16 × (24 hour protein intake in grams)}

NPU and biological value (BV) both measure nitrogen retention; the difference is that biological value is calculated from nitrogen absorbed, whereas net protein utilization is from nitrogen ingested. Another closely related quantity is the net postprandial protein utilization (NPPU), which is the maximum potential NPU of a dietary protein source under ideal conditions.

The Protein Digestibility Corrected Amino Acid Score (PDCAAS) is a more modern rating for determining protein quality, and the current ranking standard used by the FDA.

The Digestible Indispensable Amino Acid Score (DIAAS) is a protein quality method, proposed in March 2013 by the Food and Agriculture Organization to replace the current protein ranking standard, the Protein Digestibility Corrected Amino Acid Score (PDCAAS). The proposition is contested, however, due to lack of data.

== See also ==
- Protein efficiency ratio
- Nitrogen balance
