= Protein digestibility corrected amino acid score =

Method of evaluating a protein's quality

Protein digestibility-corrected amino acid score (PDCAAS) is a method of evaluating the quality of a protein based on both the amino acid requirements of humans and their ability to digest it.

The PDCAAS rating was recommended by the Food and Agriculture Organization of the United Nations/World Health Organization (FAO/WHO) in 1989 (report published in 1991). It was adopted by the US FDA in 1993 as "the preferred 'best'" method to determine protein quality.

In 2013, FAO proposed changing to Digestible Indispensable Amino Acid Score.

== Background ==
The PDCAAS value is different from measuring the quality of protein from the protein efficiency ratio (PER) and the biological value (BV) methods. The PER was based upon the amino acid requirements of growing rats, which differ significantly from those of humans. The PDCAAS allows evaluation of food protein quality based on the needs of humans as it measures the quality of a protein based on the amino acid requirements (adjusted for digestibility) of a 2- to 5-year-old child (considered the most nutritionally demanding age group). The BV method uses nitrogen absorption as a basis. However, it does not take into account certain factors influencing the digestion of the protein and is of limited use for application to human protein requirements because what is measured is maximal potential of quality and not a true estimate of quality at requirement level. Nevertheless, BV can be used to assess requirements of protein derived from foods with known quality differences and measure the proportion of absorbed nitrogen which is retained and presumably used for protein synthesis as an accurate indicator for protein measurement.

The FDA gave two reasons for adopting the PDCAAS in 1993: 1) PDCAAS is based on human amino acid requirements, which makes it more appropriate for humans than a method based on the amino acid needs of animals. 2) The Food and Agricultural Organization/World Health Organization (FAO/WHO) had previously recommended PDCAAS for regulatory purposes.

== Methodology ==
Using the PDCAAS method, the protein quality rankings are determined by comparing the amino acid profile of the specific food protein against a standard amino acid profile with the highest possible score being a 1.0. This score means, after digestion of the protein, it provides per unit of protein 100% or more of the indispensable amino acids required.

The formula for calculating the PDCAAS percentage is: FTPD × AAS × 100%, where FTPD is fecal true digestibility and AAS is the amino acid score.

- AAS is calculated as mg of limiting amino acid in 1 g of test protein / mg of same amino acid in 1 g of reference protein.
- FTPD is calculated as (PI - (FP - MFP))/PI. PI is protein intake, FP is fecal protein, MFP is metabolic fecal protein (amount of protein in feces on a protein-free diet). The digestibility test is done with rats.

Some sources may list AAS and PD separately as percentages.

== Limitations ==
=== Digestion ===
Amino acids that move beyond the terminal ileum in the body are less likely to be absorbed for use in protein synthesis. They may pass out of the body or become absorbed by bacteria, thus appearing to have been digested instead of being present in the feces. The PDCAAS takes no account of where the proteins have been digested.

Similarly, amino acids that are lost due to antinutritional factors present in many foods are assumed to be digested according to the PDCAAS. This is linked with the earlier problem, as an antinutritional factor may prevent the rat's small intestines from absorbing the protein but do not deter the rat's gut bacteria from doing so. In addition, older rats show lower PDCAAS-estimated fecal digestibility compared to young rats when the protein source contains antinutritional factors.

The report of 1989 did make use of existing per-amino-acid ileum digestibility values, but the requirement of pumping material out of the ileum was seen as too cumbersome. The fecal digestibility of the entire protein was adopted as a convenient approximation. It was found to be within 10% of the true amino-acid digestibility when applied to most protein sources with the notable exception of grain legumes. With beans, peas and lentils, the true digestibility of methionine, cystine and tryptophan can be much lower.

In 2013, the FAO proposed changing to Digestible Indispensable Amino Acid Score, which uses per-amino-acid ileum digestibility.

=== Capped score ===
In addition, the fact that four proteins, all with different amino acid profiles, receive identical scores of 1.0 limits its usefulness as a comparative tool. Since they have different compositions, it is natural to assume that they perform differently in the human body and should have different scores. In short, this method, however, gives no distinction of their performance relative to each other, because after they pass a certain point, they are all capped at 1.0 and receive an identical rating. This is because in 1990 at a FAO/WHO meeting, it was decided that proteins having values higher than 1.0 would be rounded or "leveled down" to 1.0 as scores above 1.0 are considered to indicate the protein contains essential amino acids in excess of the human requirements. An uncapped version can still be computed by multiplying PD with AAS.

=== Other considerations ===
Also, the scientific community has raised critical questions about the validity of PDCAAS (the validity of the preschool-age child amino acid scoring pattern, the validity of the true fecal digestibility correction and the truncation of PDCAAS values to 100%).

== Reference pattern ==
This reference pattern is based on the essential amino acid requirements for preschool children aged 1–3 years as published in Dietary Reference Intakes for Energy, Carbohydrate, Fiber, Fat, Fatty Acids, Cholesterol, Protein, and Amino Acids (2005). Adults aged 18+ will have slightly lower requirements.

Amino acid	mg/g crude protein
Isoleucine	25
Leucine	55
Lysine	51
Methionine + Cysteine (sum; sulfur amino acids)	25
Phenylalanine + Tyrosine (sum; aromatic amino acids)	47
Threonine	27
Tryptophan	7
Valine	32
Histidine	18
Total	287

== Example values ==
A PDCAAS value of 1 is the highest, and 0 the lowest. The table shows the ratings of selected foods. Parenthesized values reflect the value without truncation.

A few more values can be found in Boye et al. 2012. Note the use of several different scoring profiles in this work: "updated" versions of PDCAAS may use profiles different from the 1993 original.

PDCAAS value	Food
1 (1.31)	casein (milk protein)
1 (1.21)	cow's milk
1 (1.18)	eggs
1	soy protein
1	silkworm pupae
1	whey (milk protein)
0.996	mycoprotein (Quorn)
0.99	potato protein concentrate
0.95	chicken
0.92	beef
0.91	soy
0.893	pea protein concentrate (isolate)
0.87	Sacha Inchi Powder
0.78	chickpeas and Edamame
0.77	bamboo caterpillars
0.75	black beans
0.74	tubercles
0.73	vegetables
0.70	other peas and legumes in general
0.687	house cricket
0.66	dehulled hemp seed
0.64	fresh fruits
0.59	cereals and derivatives
0.597	cooked peas
0.594	wasp
0.558	Bombay locust
0.52	peanuts
0.50	rices
0.48	dried fruits
0.525	wheat bran
0.42	wheat
0.342	scarab beetle
0.25	wheat gluten (food)

== See also ==
- Amino acid score
- Protein quality
- Net protein utilization
- Nitrogen balance
