= Nitrogen balance =

Nitrogen composition in the human body

In human physiology, nitrogen balance is the net difference between bodily nitrogen intake (ingestion) and loss (excretion). It can be represented as the following:

$\mbox{nitrogen balance} = {\mbox{nitrogen intake}} - {\mbox{nitrogen loss}}$

Nitrogen is a fundamental chemical component of amino acids, the molecular building blocks of protein. As such, nitrogen balance may be used as an index of protein metabolism. When more nitrogen is gained than lost by an individual, they are considered to have a positive nitrogen balance and be in a state of overall protein anabolism. In contrast, a negative nitrogen balance, in which more nitrogen is lost than gained, indicates a state of overall protein catabolism.

The body obtains nitrogen from dietary protein, sources of which include meat, fish, eggs, dairy products, nuts, legumes, cereals, and grains. Nitrogen loss occurs largely through urine in the form of urea, as well as through faeces, sweat, and growth of hair and skin.

Blood urea nitrogen and urine urea nitrogen tests can be used to estimate nitrogen balance.

== Physiological and Clinical Implications ==
Positive nitrogen balance is associated with periods of growth, hypothyroidism, tissue repair, and pregnancy.

Negative nitrogen balance is associated with serious tissue injuries, fever, hyperthyroidism, wasting diseases, and periods of fasting. A negative nitrogen balance can be used as part of a clinical evaluation of malnutrition.

Nitrogen balance is a method traditionally used to measure dietary protein requirements. This approach necessitates the meticulous collection of all nitrogen inputs and outputs to ensure comprehensive accounting of nitrogen exchanges. Nitrogen balance studies typically involve controlled dietary conditions, requiring participants to consume specific diets to determine total nitrogen intake precisely. Furthermore, participants often must remain at the study location for the duration of the study to facilitate the collection of all nitrogen losses. Physical exercise is also known to influence nitrogen excretion, adding another variable that requires control during these studies. Due to the stringent conditions required for accurate results, the nitrogen balance method may pose challenges when studying dietary protein requirements across different demographics, such as children.

== See also ==
- Protein (nutrient)
- Biological value
- Net protein utilization
- Protein efficiency ratio
- Protein digestibility
- Protein Digestibility Corrected Amino Acid Score
