= Bioeconomy =

Economic activity focused on biotechnology

Biobased economy, bioeconomy or biotechonomy is an economic activity involving the use of biotechnology and biomass in the production of goods, services, or energy. The terms are widely used by regional development agencies, national and international organizations, and biotechnology companies. They are closely linked to the evolution of the biotechnology industry and the capacity to study, understand, and manipulate genetic material that has been possible due to scientific research and technological development. This includes the application of scientific and technological developments to agriculture, health, chemical, and energy industries.

A video by New Harvest and Xprize explaining the development of cultured meat and a "post-animal bio-economy" driven by lab-grown protein (meat, eggs, milk)

== Definitions ==
Bioeconomy has several definitions. The bioeconomy comprises those parts of the economy that use renewable biological resources from land and sea – such as crops, forests, fish, animals and micro-organisms – to produce food, health, materials, products, textiles and energy. The definitions and usage does however vary between different areas of the world.

An important aspect of the bioeconomy is understanding mechanisms and processes at the molecular, genetic, and genomic levels, and applying this understanding to creating or improving industrial processes, developing new products and services, and producing new energy. Bioeconomy aims to reduce our dependence on fossil natural resources, to prevent biodiversity loss and to create new economic growth and jobs that are in line with the principles of sustainable development.

=== Earlier definitions ===
The term 'biotechonomy' was used by Juan Enríquez and Rodrigo Martinez at the Genomics Seminar in the 1997 AAAS meeting. An excerpt of this paper was published in Science."

In 2010, it was defined in the report "The Knowledge Based Bio-Economy (KBBE) in Europe: Achievements and Challenges" by Albrecht & al. as follows: The bio-economy is the sustainable production and conversion of biomass, for a range of food, health, fibre and industrial products and energy, where renewable biomass encompasses any biological material to be used as raw material."

According to a 2013 study, "the bioeconomy can be defined as an economy where the basic building blocks for materials, chemicals and energy are derived from renewable biological resources".

The First Global Bioeconomy Summit in Berlin in November 2015 defines bioeconomy as "knowledge-based production and utilization of biological resources, biological processes and principles to sustainably provide goods and services across all economic sectors". According to the summit, bioeconomy involves three elements: renewable biomass, enabling and converging technologies, and integration across applications concerning primary production (i.e. all living natural resources), health (i.e. pharmaceuticals and medical devices), and industry (i.e. chemicals, plastics, enzymes, pulp and paper, bioenergy).

== History ==
Enríquez and Martinez' 2002 Harvard Business School working paper, "Biotechonomy 1.0: A Rough Map of Biodata Flow", showed the global flow of genetic material into and out of the three largest public genetic databases: GenBank, EMBL and DDBJ. The authors then hypothesized about the economic impact that such data flows might have on patent creation, evolution of biotech startups and licensing fees. An adaptation of this paper was published in Wired magazine in 2003.

The term 'bioeconomy' became popular from the mid-2000s with its adoption by the European Union and Organisation for Economic Co-operation and Development as a policy agenda and framework to promote the use of biotechnology to develop new products, markets, and uses of biomass. Since then, both the EU (2012) and OECD (2006) have created dedicated bioeconomy strategies, as have an increasing number of countries around the world. Often these strategies conflate the bioeconomy with the term 'bio-based economy'. For example, since 2005 the Netherlands has sought to promote the creation of a biobased economy. Pilot plants have been started i.e. in Lelystad (Zeafuels), and a centralised organisation exists (Interdepartementaal programma biobased economy), with supporting research (Food & Biobased Research) being conducted. Other European countries have also developed and implemented bioeconomy or bio-based economy policy strategies and frameworks.

In 2012, president Barack Obama of the USA announced intentions to encourage biological manufacturing methods, with a National Bioeconomy Blueprint.

== Aims ==
Global population growth and over consumption of many resources are causing increasing environmental pressure and climate change. Bioeconomy tackles with these challenges. It aims to ensure food security and to promote more sustainable natural resource use as well as to reduce the dependence on non-renewable resources, e.g. fossil natural resources and minerals. In some extent bioeconomy also helps economy to reduces greenhouse gas emissions and assists in mitigating and adapting to climate change.

== Genetic modification ==
Organisms, ranging from bacteria over yeasts up to plants are used for production of enzymatic catalysis. Genetically modified bacteria have been used to produce insulin, artemisinic acid was made in engineered yeast. Some bioplastics (based on polyhydroxylbutyrate or polyhydroxylalkanoates) are produced from sugar using genetically modified microbes.

Genetically modified organisms are also used for the production of biofuels. Biofuels are a type of carbon-neutral fuel.

Research is also being done towards CO_{2} fixation using a synthetic metabolic pathway. By genetically modifying E. coli bacteria so as to allow them to consume CO_{2}, the bacterium may provide the infrastructure for the future renewable production of food and green fuels.

One of the organisms (Ideonella sakaiensis) that is able to break down PET (a plastic) into other substances has been genetically modified to break down PET even faster and also break down PEF. Once plastics (which are normally non-biodegradable) are broken down and recycled into other substances (i.e. biomatter in the case of Tenebrio molitor larvae) it can be used as an input for other animals.

Genetically modified crops are also used. Genetically modified energy crops for instance may provide some additional advantages such as reduced associated costs (i.e. costs during the manufacturing process ) and less water use. One example are trees have been genetically modified to either have less lignin, or to express lignin with chemically labile bonds.

With genetically modified crops however, there are still some challenges involved (hurdles to regulatory approvals, market adoption and public acceptance).

== Fields ==
According to European Union Bioeconomy Strategy updated in 2018 the bioeconomy covers all sectors and systems that rely on biological resources (animals, plants, micro-organisms and derived biomass, including organic waste), their functions and principles. It covers all primary production and economic and industrial sectors that base on use, production or processing biological resources from agriculture, forestry, fisheries and aquaculture. The product of bioeconomy are typically food, feed and other biobased products, bioenergy and services based on biological resources. The bioeconomy aims to drive towards sustainability, circularity as well as the protection of the environment and will enhance biodiversity.

In some definitions, bioeconomy comprises also ecosystem services that are services offered by the environment, including binding carbon dioxide and opportunities for recreation. Another key aspect of the bioeconomy is not wasting natural resources but using and recycling them efficiently.

According to EU Bioeconomy Report 2016, the bioeconomy brings together various sectors of the economy that produce, process and reuse renewable biological resources (agriculture, forestry, fisheries, food, bio-based chemicals and materials and bioenergy).

=== Agriculture ===
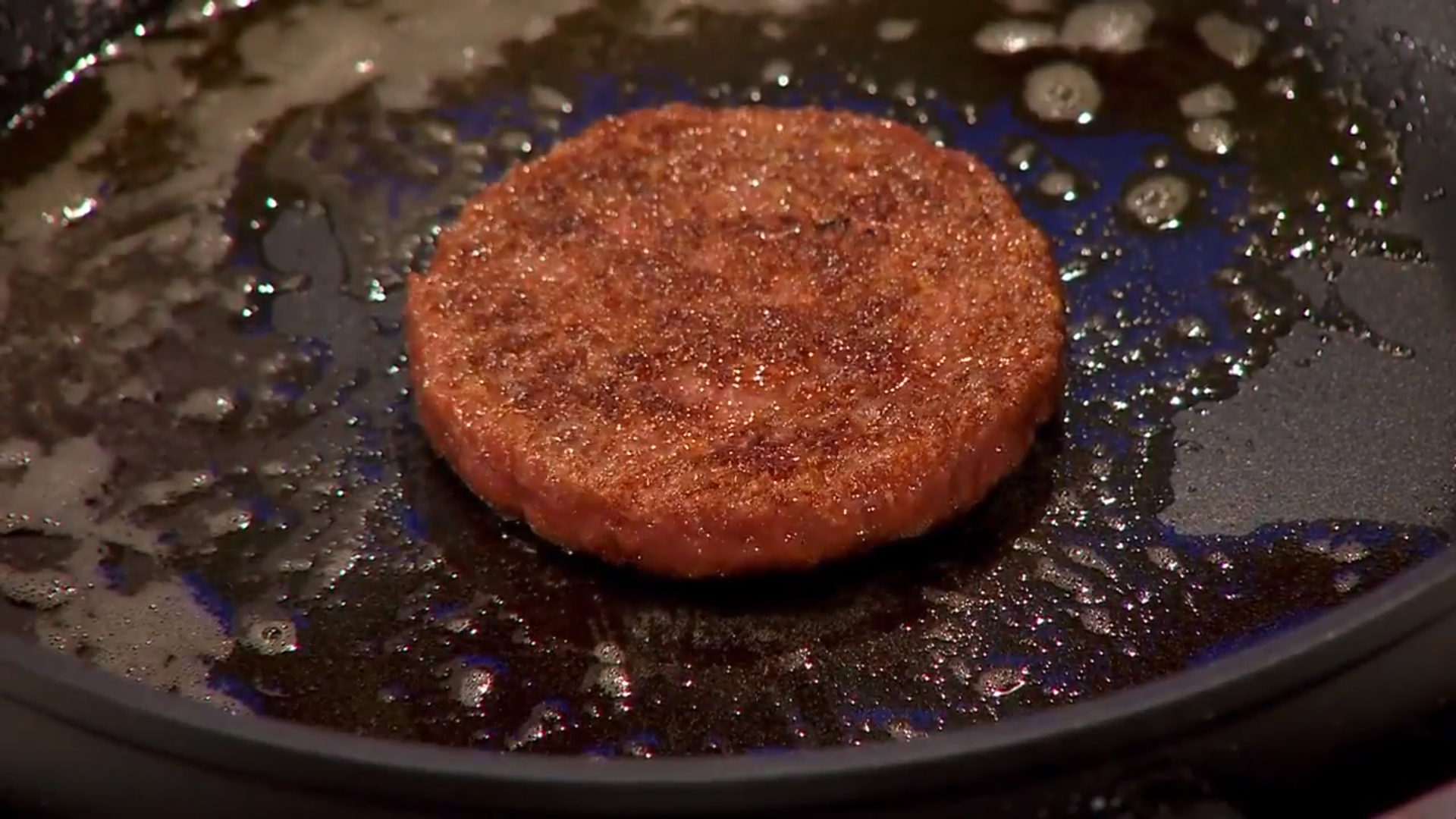
Presentation of the world's first cultured meat hamburger

Cellular agriculture is the production of agricultural products from cell cultures, using a combination of biotechnology, tissue engineering, molecular biology, and synthetic biology to create and design new methods for producing proteins, fats, and tissues that would otherwise be derived from traditional agriculture. This sector focuses primarily on the production of animal-derived products, including meat, milk,, honey, and eggs, obtained through cell culture. It is proposed as a sustainable alternative to livestock farming and slaughter, practices that pose significant global challenges in terms of environmental impact (e.g., of meat production), animal welfare, food security, and human health. (Full article...)

However, not all synthetic nutrition products are animal food products such as meat and dairy – for instance, as of 2021 there are also products of synthetic coffee that are reported to be close to commercialization. Similar fields of research and production based on bioeconomy agriculture are:

- Microbial food cultures and genetically engineered microbial production (e.g. of spider silk or solar-energy-based protein powder)
- Controlled self-assembly of plant proteins (e.g. of spider silk similar plant-proteins-based plastics alternatives)
- Cell-free artificial synthesis (e.g. of starch)
- Bioproduced imitation foods (e.g. meat alternatives and milk substitutes)

Many of the foods produced with tools and methods of the bioeconomy may not be intended for human consumption but for non-human animals such as for livestock feed, insect-based pet food or sustainable aquacultural feed. There are various startups and research teams around the world who use synthetic biology to create animal feed.

Moreover, crops could be genetically engineered in ways that e.g. safely increase yields, reduce the need for pesticides or ease indoor production.

One example of a product highly specific to the bioeconomy that is widely available is algae oil which is a dietary supplement that could substitute possibly less sustainable, larger-market-share fish oil supplements.

==== Vertical farming ====
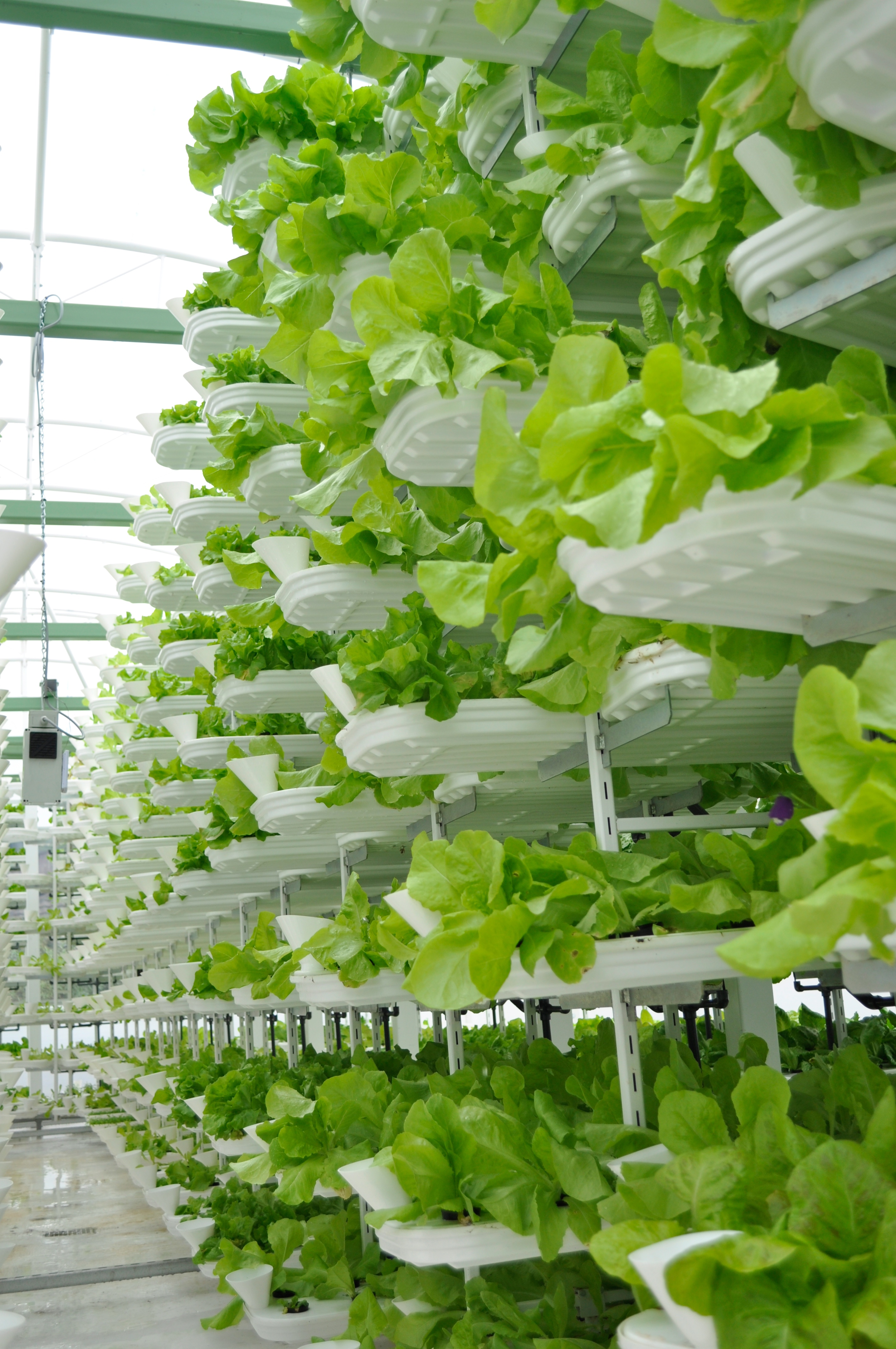
Lettuce grown in indoor vertical farming system

Vertical farming is the practice of growing crops in vertically and horizontally stacked layers. It often incorporates controlled-environment agriculture, which aims to optimize plant growth, and soilless farming techniques such as hydroponics, aquaponics, and aeroponics. Some common choices of structures to house vertical farming systems include buildings, shipping containers, underground tunnels, and abandoned mine shafts.

The modern concept of vertical farming was proposed in 1999 by Dickson Despommier, professor of Public and Environmental Health at Columbia University. Despommier and his students came up with a design for a skyscraper farm that could feed 50,000 people. Although the design has not yet been built, it successfully popularized the idea of vertical farming. Current applications of vertical farming coupled with other state-of-the-art technologies, such as specialized LED lights, have resulted in over 10 times the crop yield as would be received through traditional farming methods.

The main advantage of utilizing vertical farming technologies is the increased crop yield that comes with a smaller unit area of land requirement. The increased ability to cultivate a larger variety of crops at once because crops do not share the same plots of land while growing is another sought-after advantage. Additionally, crops are resistant to weather disruptions because of their placement indoors, meaning fewer crops lost to extreme or unexpected weather occurrences. Lastly, because of its limited land usage, vertical farming is less disruptive to the native plants and animals, leading to further conservation of the local flora and fauna.

Vertical farming technologies face economic challenges with large start-up costs compared to traditional farms. They cannot grow all types of crops but can be cost-effective for high value products such as salad vegetables. Vertical farms also face large energy demands due to the use of supplementary light like LEDs. The buildings also need excellent control of temperature, humidity and water supplies. Moreover, if non low-carbon electricity is used to meet these energy demands, vertical farms could produce more pollution than traditional farms or greenhouses. An approach to ensure better energy-related environmental performance is to use agrivoltaic-powered vertical farming in an agrotunnel or similar CEA. In this way crops can be grown beneath outdoor agrivoltaics and the solar electricity they provide can be used to power the vertical farming.

==== Fungiculture ====
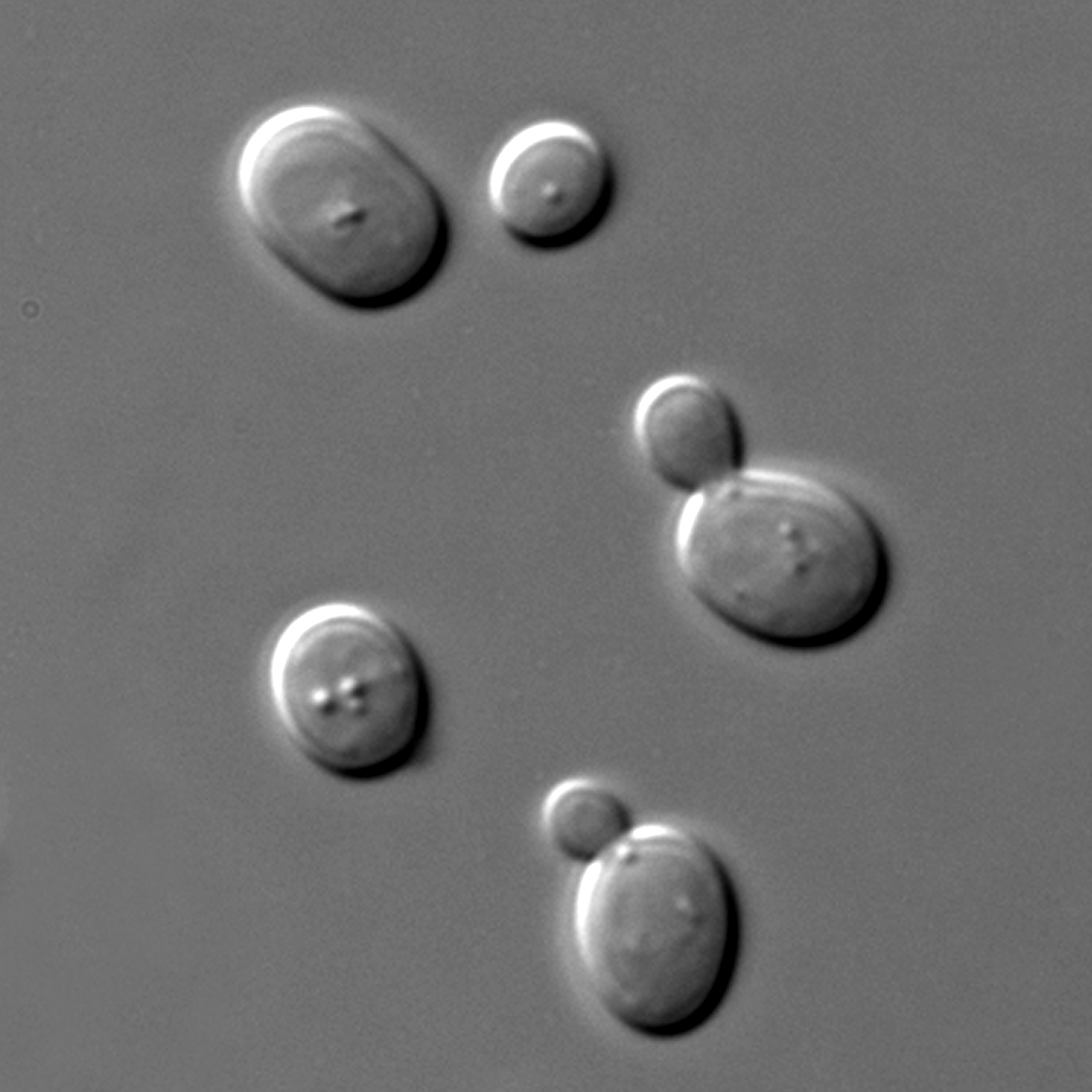
Saccharomyces cerevisiae cells shown with DIC microscopy

The human use of fungi for food preparation or preservation and other purposes is extensive and has a long history. Mushroom farming and mushroom gathering are large industries in many countries. The study of the historical uses and sociological impact of fungi is known as ethnomycology. Because of the capacity of this group to produce an enormous range of natural products with antimicrobial or other biological activities, many species have long been used or are being developed for industrial production of antibiotics, vitamins, and anti-cancer and cholesterol-lowering drugs. Methods have been developed for genetic engineering of fungi, enabling metabolic engineering of fungal species. For example, genetic modification of yeast species—which are easy to grow at fast rates in large fermentation vessels—has opened up ways of pharmaceutical production that are potentially more efficient than production by the original source organisms. Fungi-based industries are sometimes considered to be a major part of a growing bioeconomy, with applications under research and development including use for textiles, meat substitution and general fungal biotechnology.

For example, there is ongoing research and development for indoor high-yield mechanisms.

Baker's yeast or Saccharomyces cerevisiae, a unicellular fungus, is used to make bread and other wheat-based products, such as pizza dough and dumplings. Yeast species of the genus Saccharomyces are also used to produce alcoholic beverages through fermentation. Shoyu koji mold (Aspergillus oryzae) is an essential ingredient in brewing shoyu (soy sauce) and sake, and the preparation of miso, while Rhizopus species are used for making tempeh. Several of these fungi are domesticated species that were bred or selected according to their capacity to ferment food without producing harmful mycotoxins (see below), which are produced by very closely related Aspergilli. Quorn, a meat alternative, is made from Fusarium venenatum.

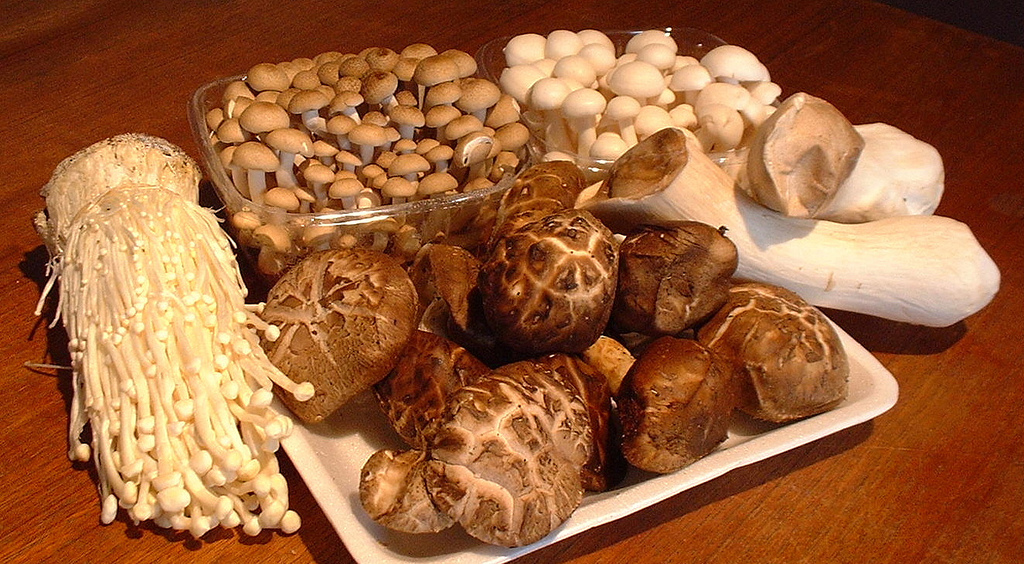
A selection of edible Asian fungi

===== Mycoprotein =====
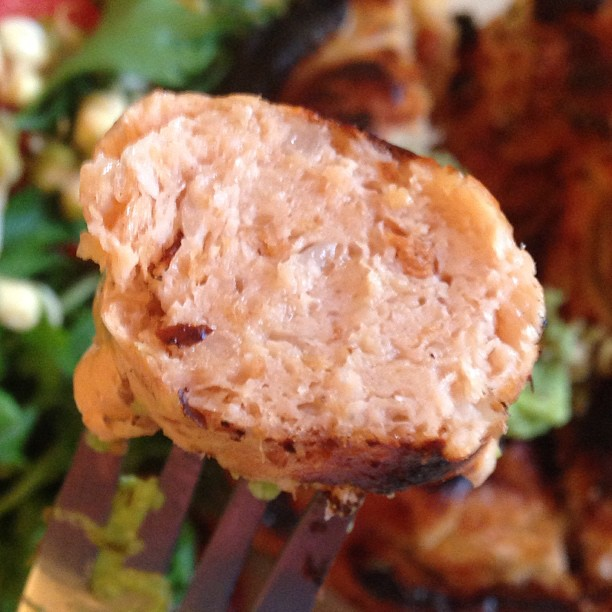
Mycoprotein prepared and served as a meat analogue

=== Algaculture ===
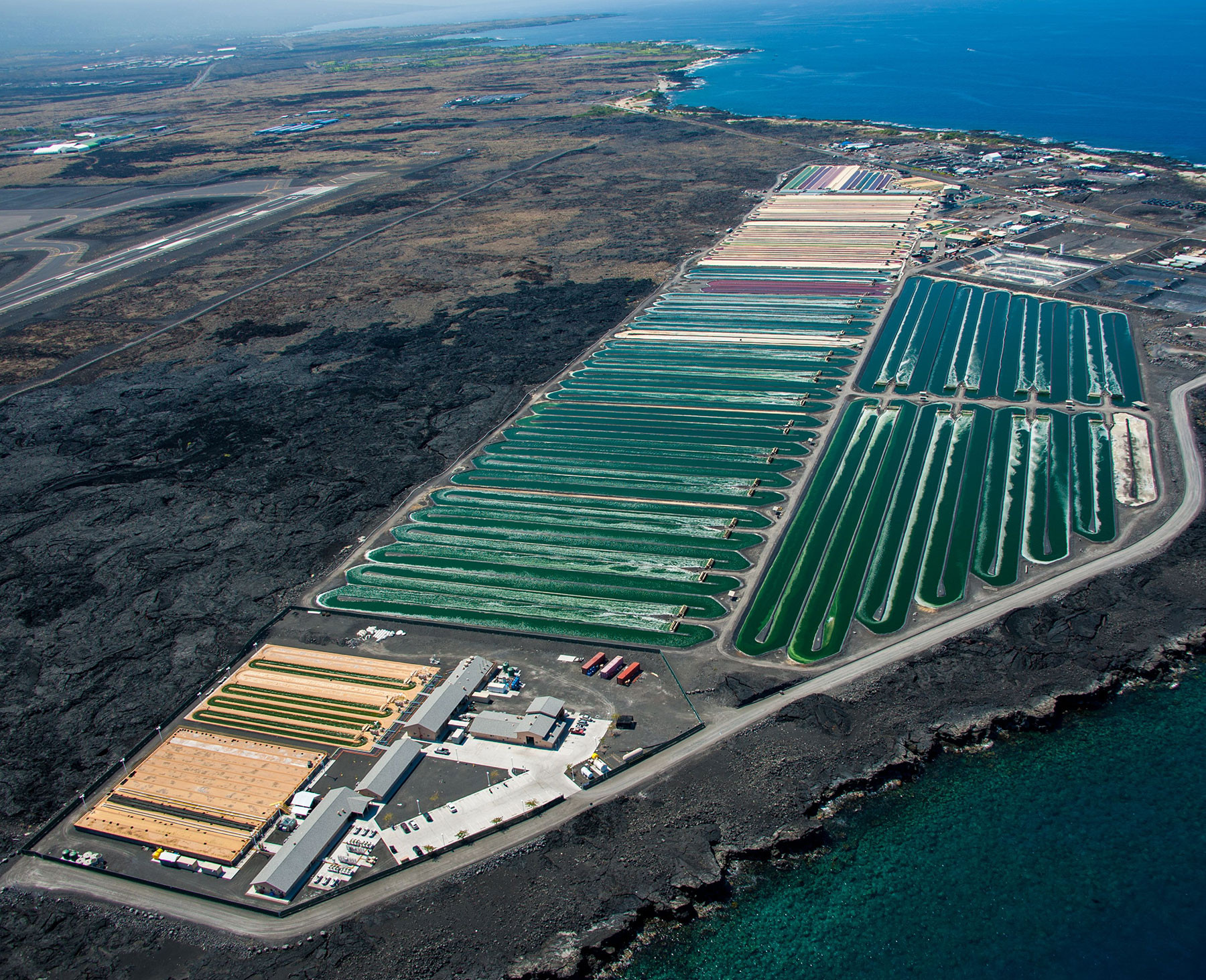
A microalgae cultivation facility

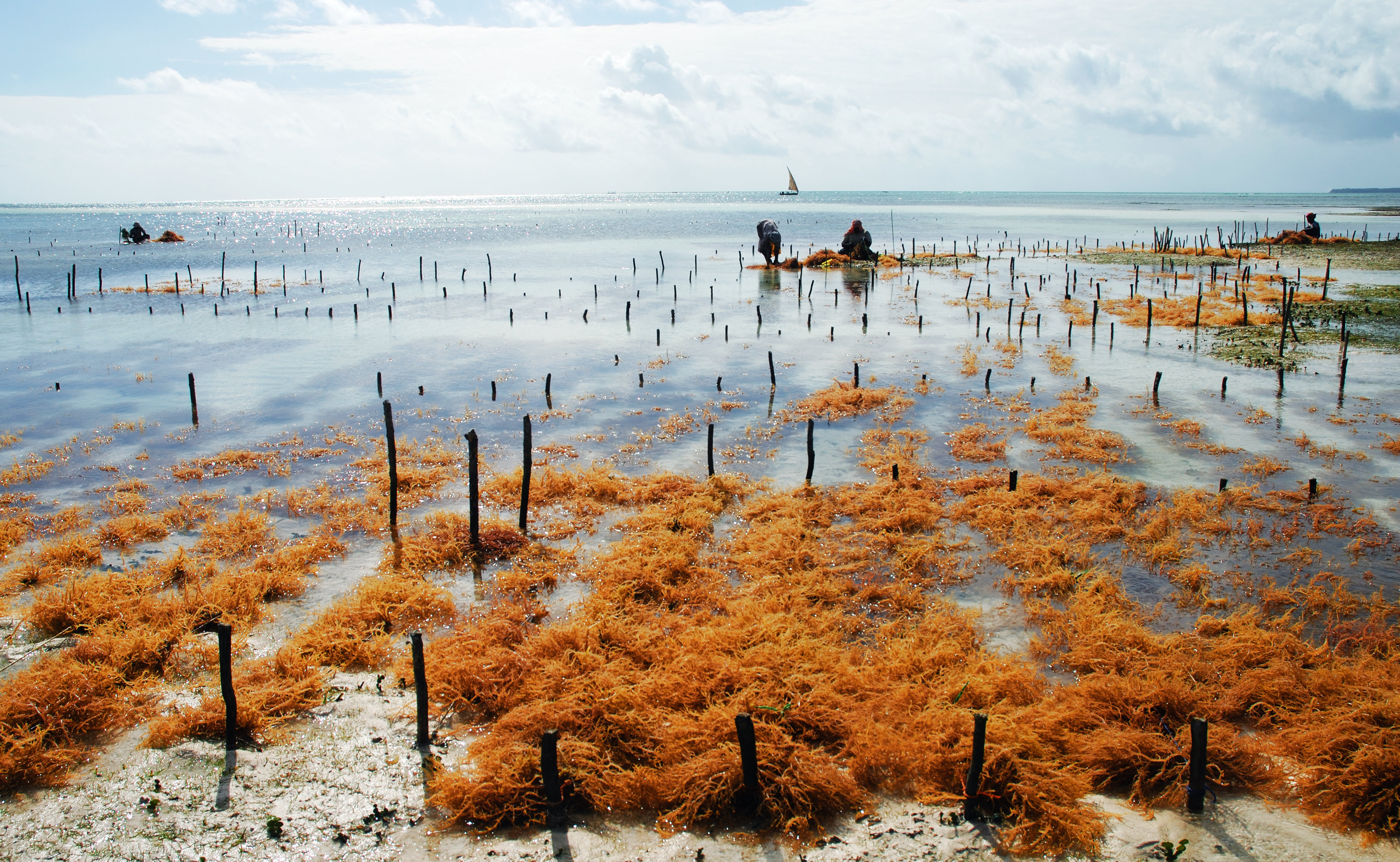
A seaweed farm in Uroa, Zanzibar

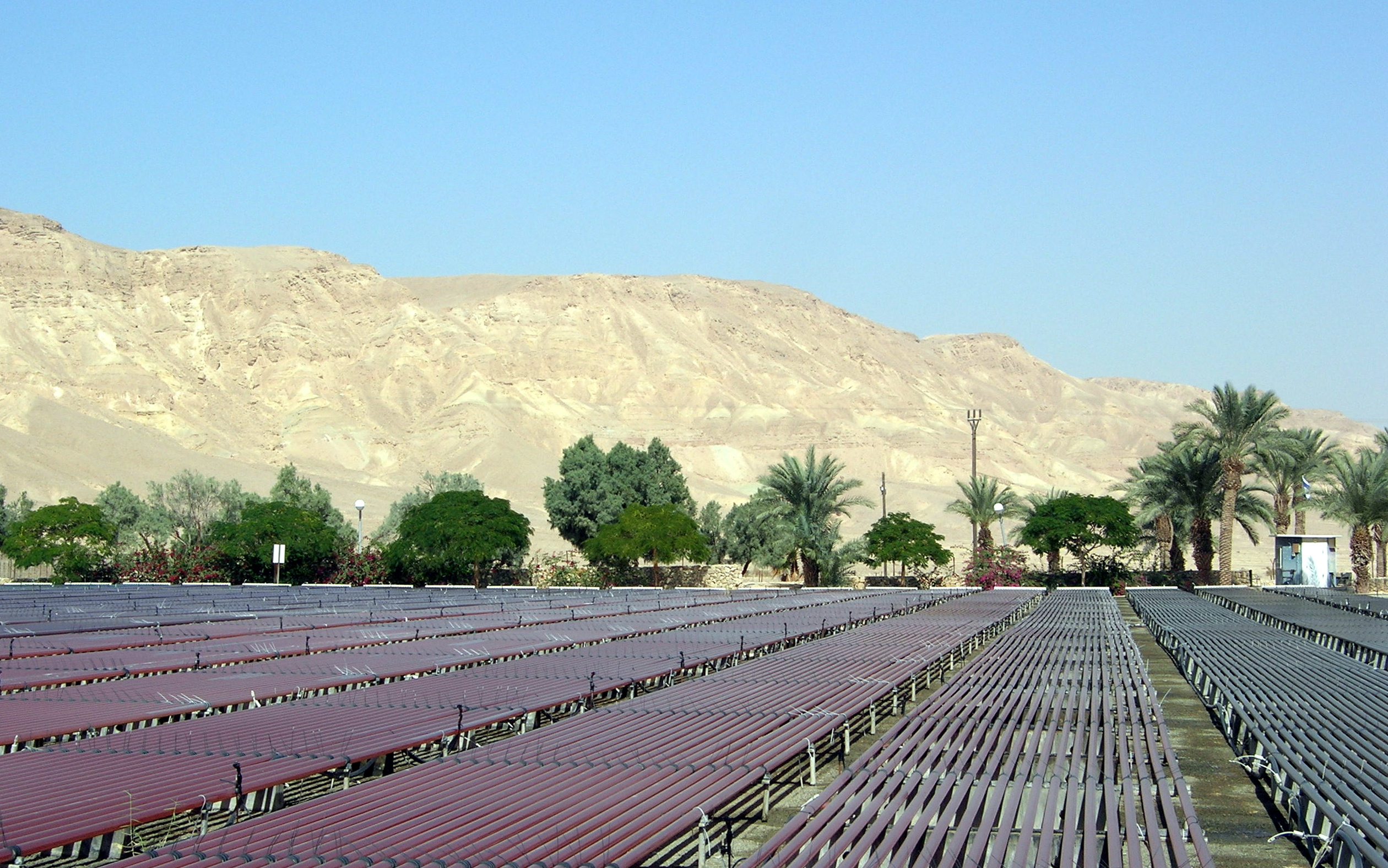
Algaculture in Kibbutz Ketura, Israel

Algaculture is a form of aquaculture involving the farming of species of algae.

The majority of algae that are intentionally cultivated fall into the category of microalgae (also referred to as phytoplankton, microphytes, or planktonic algae). Macroalgae, commonly known as seaweed, also have many commercial and industrial uses, but due to their size and the specific requirements of the environment in which they need to grow, they do not lend themselves as readily to cultivation (this may change, however, with the advent of newer seaweed cultivators, which are basically algae scrubbers using upflowing air bubbles in small containers, known as tumble culture).

Commercial and industrial algae cultivation has numerous uses, including production of nutraceuticals such as omega-3 fatty acids (as algal oil) or natural food colorants and dyes, food, fertilizers, bioplastics, chemical feedstock (raw material), protein-rich animal/aquaculture feed, pharmaceuticals, and algal fuel, and can also be used as a means of pollution control and natural carbon sequestration.

Global production of farmed aquatic plants, overwhelmingly dominated by seaweeds, grew in output volume from 13.5 million tonnes in 1995, to just over 30 million tonnes in 2016 and 37.8 million tonnes in 2022 and 40 million tonnes in 2024. This increase was the result of production expansions led by China, followed by Malaysia, the Philippines, the United Republic of Tanzania, and the Russian Federation.

Cultured microalgae already contribute to a wide range of sectors in the emerging bioeconomy. Research suggests there are large potentials and benefits of algaculture for the development of a future healthy and sustainable food system.

=== Waste management, recycling and biomining ===
Biobased applications, research and development of waste management may form a part of the bioeconomy. Bio-based recycling (e-waste, plastics recycling, etc.) is linked to waste management and relevant standards and requirements of production and products. Some of the recycling of waste may be biomining and some biomining could be applied beyond recycling.

For example, in 2020, biotechnologists reported the genetically engineered refinement and mechanical description of synergistic enzymes – PETase, first discovered in 2016, and MHETase of Ideonella sakaiensis – for faster depolymerization of PET and also of PEF, which may be useful for depollution, recycling and upcycling of mixed plastics along with other approaches. Such approaches may be more environmentally-friendly as well as cost-effective than mechanical and chemical PET-recycling, enabling circular plastic bio-economy solutions via systems based on engineered strains. Moreover, microorganisms could be employed to mine useful elements from basalt rocks via bioleaching.

=== Medicine, nutritional science and the health economy ===
In 2020, the global industry for dietary supplements was valued at $140.3 billion by a "Grand View Research" analysis. Certain parts of the health economy may overlap with the bioeconomy, including anti-aging- and life extension-related products and activities, hygiene/beauty products, functional food, sports performance related products and bio-based tests (such as of one's microbiota) and banks (such as stool banks including oral "super stool" capsules) and databases (mainly DNA databases), all of which can in turn be used for individualized interventions, monitoring as well as for the development of new products. The pharmaceutical sector, including the research and development of new antibiotics, can also be considered to be a bioeconomy sector.

=== Forest bioeconomy ===
The forest bioeconomy is based on forests and their natural resources, and covers a variety of different industry and production processes. Forest bioeconomy includes, for example, the processing of forest biomass to provide products relating to, energy, chemistry, or the food industry. Thus, forest bioeconomy covers a variety of different manufacturing processes that are based on wood material and the range of end products is wide.

Besides different wood-based products, recreation, nature tourism and game are a crucial part of forest bioeconomy. Carbon sequestration and ecosystem services are also included in the concept of forest bioeconomy.

Pulp, paper, packaging materials and sawn timber are the traditional products of the forest industry. Wood is also traditionally used in furniture and construction industries. But in addition to these, as a renewable natural resource, ingredients from wood can be valorised into innovative bioproducts alongside a range of conventional forest industry products. Thus, traditional mill sites of large forest industry companies, for example in Finland, are in the process of becoming biorefineries. In different processes, forest biomass is used to produce textiles, chemicals, cosmetics, fuels, medicine, intelligent packaging, coatings, glues, plastics, food and feed.

=== Blue bioeconomy ===
The blue bioeconomy covers businesses that are based on the sustainable use of renewable aquatic resources as well water related expertise areas. It covers the development and marketing of blue bioeconomy products and services. In that respect, the key sectors include business activities based on water expertise and technology, water-based tourism, making use of aquatic biomass, and the value chain of fisheries. Furthermore, the immaterial value of aquatic natural resources is also very high. Water areas have also other values beyond being platforms of economic activities. It provides human well-being, recreation and health.

According to the European Union the blue bioeconomy has the focus on aquatic or marine environments, especially, on novel aquaculture applications, including non-food, food and feed.

In the European Report on the Blue Growth Strategy - Towards more sustainable growth and jobs in the blue economy (2017) the blue bioeconomy is defined differently to the blue economy. The blue economy means the industries that are related to marine environment activities, e.g. shipbuilding, transport, coastal tourism, renewable energies (such as off-shore windmills), living and non-living resources.

=== Energy ===
The bioeconomy also includes bioenergy, biohydrogen, biofuel and algae fuel.

According to World Bioenergy Association 17.8 % out of gross final energy consumption was covered with renewable energy. Among renewable energy sources, bioenergy (energy from bio-based sources) is the largest renewable energy source. In 2017, bioenergy accounted for 70% of renewable energy consumption.

The role of bioenergy varies in different countries and continents. In Africa it is the most important energy sources with the share of 96%. Bioenergy has significant shares in energy production in the Americas (59%), Asia (65%) and Europe (59%). The bioenergy is produced out of a large variety of biomass from forestry, agriculture and waste and side streams of industries to produce useful end products (pellets, wood chips, bioethanol, biogas and biodiesel) for electricity, heat and transportation fuel around the world.

Biomass is a renewable natural resource but it is still a limited resource. Globally there are huge resources, but environmental, social and economic aspects limit their use. Biomass can play an important role for low-carbon solutions in the fields of customer supplies, energy, food and feed. In practice, there are many competing uses.

The biobased economy uses first-generation biomass (crops), second-generation biomass (crop refuge), and third-generation biomass (seaweed, algae). Several methods of processing are then used (in biorefineries) to gather the most out of the biomass. This includes techniques such as

- Anaerobic digestion
- Pyrolysis
- Torrefaction
- Fermentation

Anaerobic digestion is generally used to produce biogas, fermentation of sugars produces ethanol, pyrolysis is used to produce pyrolysis-oil (which is solidified biogas), and torrefaction is used to create biomass-coal. Biomass-coal and biogas is then burnt for energy production, ethanol can be used as a (vehicle)-fuel, as well as for other purposes, such as skincare products.

Biobased energy can be used to manage intermittency of variable renewable energy like solar and wind.

==== Woodchips and pellets ====
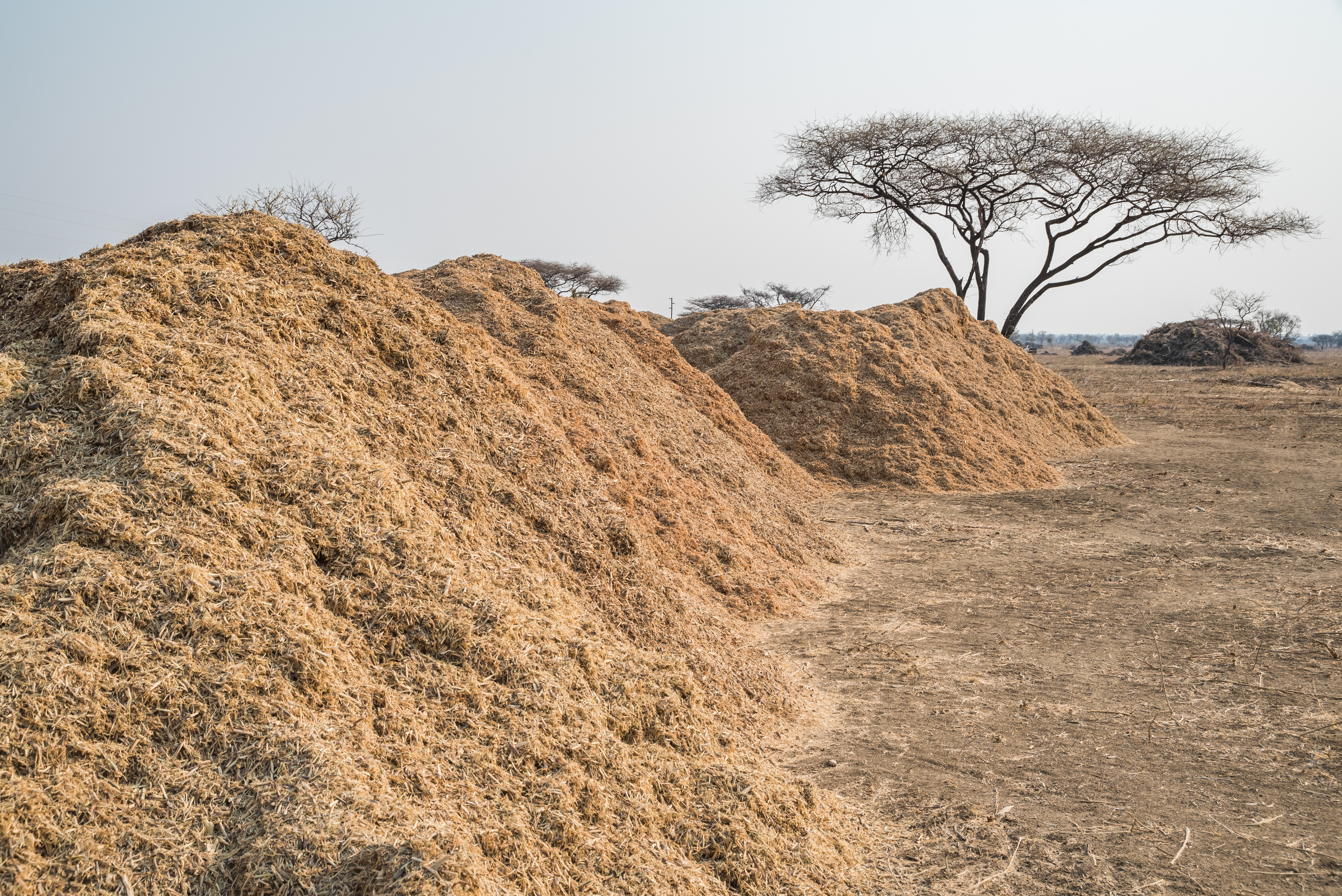
Woody chips left for drying before transport to industrial off-takers in Namibia

Woodchips have been traditionally used as solid fuel for space heating or in energy plants to generate electric power from renewable energy. The main source of forest chips in Europe and in most of the countries have been logging residues. It is expected that the shares of stumps and roundwood will increase in the future. As of 2013 in the EU, the estimates for biomass potential for energy, available under current 2018 conditions including sustainable use of the forest as well as providing wood to the traditional forest sectors, are: 277 million m^{3}, for above ground biomass and 585 million m^{3} for total biomass.

The newer fuel systems for heating use either woodchips or wood pellets. The advantage of woodchips is cost, the advantage of wood pellets is the controlled fuel value. The use of woodchips in automated heating systems, is based on a robust technology.

The size of the woodchips, moisture content, and the raw material from which the chips are made are particularly important when burning wood chips in small plants. Unfortunately, there are not many standards to decide the fractions of woodchip. However, as of March 2018, The American National Standards Institute approved AD17225-4 Wood Chip Heating Fuel Quality Standard. The full title of the standard is: ANSI/ASABE AD17225-4:2014 FEB2018 Solid Biofuels—Fuel Specifications and classes—Part 4: Graded wood chips. One common chip category is the GF60 which is commonly used in smaller plants, including small industries, villas, and apartment buildings. "GF60" is known as "Fine, dry, small chips". The requirements for GF60 are that the moisture is between 10 and 30% and the fractions of the woodchips are distributed as follows: 0–3.5mm: <8%, 3.5–30mm: <7%, 30–60 mm: 80–100%, 60–100 mm: <3%, 100–120 mm: <2%.

The energy content in one cubic metre is normally higher than in one cubic metre wood logs, but can vary greatly depending on moisture. The moisture is decided by the handling of the raw material. If the trees are taken down in the winter and left to dry for the summer (with teas in the bark and covered so rain can't reach to them), and is then chipped in the fall, the woodchips' moisture content will be approximately 20–25%. The energy content, then, is approximately 3.5–4.5kWh/kg (~150–250 kg/cubic metre).

Coal power plants have been converted to run on woodchips, which is fairly straightforward to do, since they both use an identical steam turbine heat engine, and the cost of woodchip fuel is comparable to coal.

Solid biomass is an attractive fuel for addressing the concerns of the energy crisis and climate change, since the fuel is affordable, widely available, close to carbon neutral and thus climate-neutral in terms of carbon dioxide (CO_{2}), since in the ideal case only the carbon dioxide which was drawn in during the tree's growth and stored in the wood is released into the atmosphere again.

Woodchips are similar to wood pellets, in that the movement and handling is more amenable to automation than cord wood, particularly for smaller systems. Woodchips are less expensive to produce than wood pellets, which must be processed in specialized facilities. While avoiding the costs associated with refinement, the lower density and higher moisture content of woodchips reduces their calorific value, substantially increasing the feedstock needed to generate an equivalent amount of heat. Greater physical volume requirements also increase the expense and emissions impact of trucking, storing and/or shipping the wood.

Woodchips are less expensive than cord wood, because the harvesting is faster and more highly automated. Woodchips are of greater supply, partly because all parts of a tree can be chipped, whereas small limbs and branches can require substantial labor to convert to cord wood. Cord wood generally needs to be "seasoned" or "dry" before it can be burned cleanly and efficiently. On the other hand, woodchip systems are typically designed to cleanly and efficiently burn "green chips" with very high moisture content of 43–47% (wet basis). (see gasification and woodgas)

==== Getting the most out of the biomass ====
For economic reasons, the processing of the biomass is done according to a specific pattern (a process called cascading). This pattern depends on the types of biomass used. The whole of finding the most suitable pattern is known as biorefining. A general list shows the products with high added value and lowest volume of biomass to the products with the lowest added value and highest volume of biomass:

- fine chemicals/medicines
- food
- chemicals/bioplastics
- transport fuels
- electricity and heat

Recent studies have highlighted the potential of traditionally used plants, in providing value-added products in remote areas of the world. A study conducted on tobacco plants proposed a non-exhaustive list of compounds with potential economic interest that can be sourced from these plants.

=== Other fields and applications ===
Bioproducts or bio-based products are products that are made from biomass. The term "bioproduct" refers to a wide array of industrial and commercial products that are characterized by a variety of properties, compositions and processes, as well as different benefits and risks.

Bio-based products are developed in order to reduce dependency on fossil fuels and non-renewable resources. To achieve this, the key is to develop new bio-refining technologies to sustainably transform renewable natural resources into bio-based products, materials and fuels, e.g.

==== Microtechnology (medicine and energy) ====
Synthetic biology can be used for creating nanoparticles which can be used for drug-delivery as well as for other purposes. Complementing research and development seeks to and has created synthetic cells that mimics functions of biological cells. Applications include medicine such as designer-nanoparticles that make blood cells eat away—from the inside out—portions of atherosclerotic plaque that cause heart attacks. Synthetic micro-droplets for algal cells or synergistic algal-bacterial multicellular spheroid microbial reactors, for example, could be used to produce hydrogen as hydrogen economy biotechnology.

==== Climate change adaptation and mitigation ====
Activities and technologies for bio-based climate change adaptation could be considered as part of the bioeconomy. Examples may include:

- reforestation (alongside forest protection)
- algaculture carbon sequestration
- artificial assistance to make coral reefs more resilient against climate change
- restoration of seagrass, mangroves and salt marshes

==== Materials ====
There is a potential for biobased-production of building materials (insulation, surface materials, etc.) as well as new materials in general (polymers, plastics, composites, etc.). Photosynthetic microbial cells have been used as a step to synthetic production of spider silk.

===== Bioplastics =====
Bioplastics are not just one single material. They comprise a whole family of materials with different properties and applications. According to European Bioplastics, a plastic material is defined as a bioplastic if it is either bio-based plastic, biodegradable plastic, or is a material with both properties. Bioplastics have the same properties as conventional plastics and offer additional advantages, such as a reduced carbon footprint or additional waste management options, such as composting.

Bioplastics are divided into three main groups:

- Bio-based or partially bio-based non-biodegradable plastics such as bio-based PE, PP, or PET (so-called drop-ins) and bio-based technical performance polymers such as PTT or TPC-ET
- Plastics that are both bio-based and biodegradable, such as PLA and PHA or PBS
- Plastics that are based on fossil resources and are biodegradable, such as PBAT

Additionally, new materials such as PLA, PHA, cellulose or starch-based materials offer solutions with completely new functionalities such as biodegradability and compostability, and in some cases optimized barrier properties. Along with the growth in variety of bioplastic materials, properties such as flexibility, durability, printability, transparency, barrier, heat resistance, gloss and many more have been significantly enhanced.

Bioplastics have been made from sugarbeet, by bacteria.

====== Examples of bioplastics ======
- Paptic: There are packaging materials which combine the qualities of paper and plastic. For example, Paptic is produced from wood-based fibre that contains more than 70% wood. The material is formed with foam-forming technology that saves raw material and improves the qualities of the material. The material can be produced as reels, which enables it to be delivered with existing mills. The material is spatter-proof but is decomposed when put under water. It is more durable than paper and maintains its shape better than plastic. The material is recycled with cardboards.

====== Examples of bio-composites ======
- Sulapac tins are made from wood chips and biodegradable natural binder and they have features similar to plastic. These packaging products tolerate water and fats, and they do not allow oxygen to pass. Sulapac products combine ecology, luxury and are not subject to design limitations. Sulapac can compete with traditional plastic tins by cost and is suitable for the same packing devices.
- Woodio produces wood composite sinks and other bathroom furniture. The composite is produced by moulding a mixture of wood chips and crystal clear binder. Woodio has developed a solid wood composite that is entirely waterproof. The material has similar features to ceramic, but can be used for producing energy at the end of its lifespan, unlike ceramic waste. Solid wood composite is hard and can be moulded with wooden tools.
- Woodcast is a renewable and biodegradable casting material. It is produced from woodchips and biodegradable plastic. It is hard and durable in room temperature but when heated is flexible and self-sticky. Woodcast can be applied to all plastering and supporting elements. The material is breathable and X-ray transparent. It is used in plastering and in occupational therapy and can be moulded to any anatomical shape. Excess pieces can be reused: used casts can be disposed of either as energy or biowaste. The composite differs from traditional lime cast in that it doesn't need water and it is non-toxic. Therefore, gas-masks, gauntlets or suction fans are not required when handling the cast.

===== For sustainable packaging =====
Bio-based materials have been developed or used for packaging without plastics, especially for use-cases in which packaging can't be phased-out, such as for food preservation.

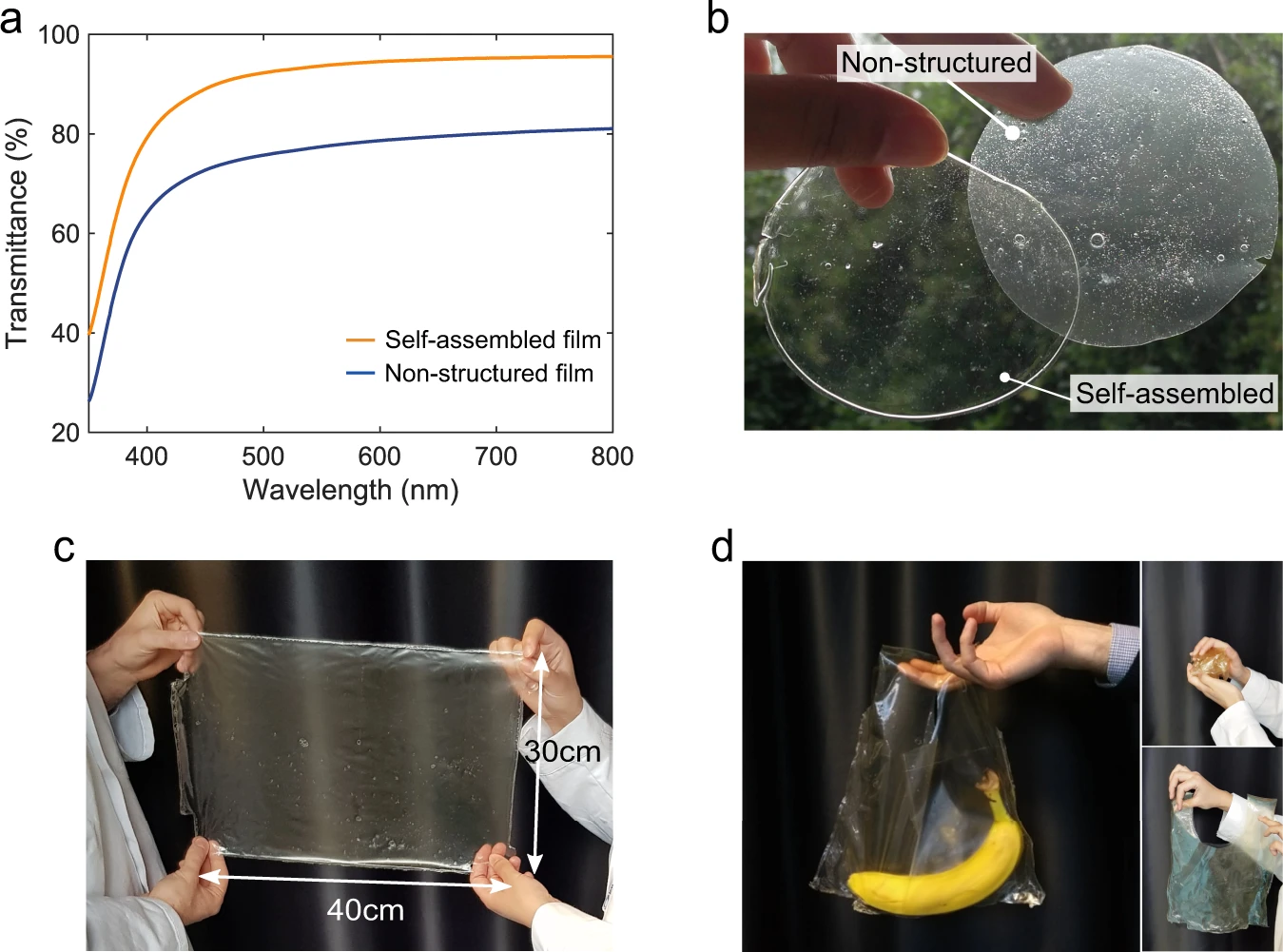
Optical appearance of self-assembled films of sustainable packaging alternative to plastic

A plant proteins-based biodegradable packaging alternative to plastic was developed based on research about spider silk which is known for its high strength and similar on the molecular level.

Researchers at the Agricultural Research Service are looking into using dairy-based films as an alternative to petroleum-based packaging. Instead of being made of synthetic polymers, these dairy-based films would be composed of proteins such as casein and whey, which are found in milk. The films would be biodegradable and offer better oxygen barriers than synthetic, chemical-based films. Another biodegradable polymer, polysaccharides, found in cellulose, chitosan, and starch, can also be used to create the films, coatings, and aerogels for food packaging. More research must be done to improve the water barrier quality of the dairy-based film, but advances in sustainable packaging are actively being pursued.

Sustainable packaging policy cannot be individualized by a specific product. Effective legislation would need to include alternatives to many products, not just a select few; otherwise, the positive impacts of sustainable packing will not be as effective as they need in order to propel a significant reduction of plastic packaging. Finding alternatives can reduce greenhouse gas emissions from unsustainable packaging production and reduce dangerous chemical by-products of unsustainable packaging practices.

==== Textiles ====
The textile industry, or certain activities and elements of it, could be considered to be a strong global bioeconomy sector. Textiles are produced from natural fibres, regenerated fibres and synthetic fibres (Sinclair 2014). The natural fibre textile industry is based on cotton, linen, bamboo, hemp, wool, silk, angora, mohair and cashmere.

Activities related to textile production and processing that more clearly fall under the domain of the bioeconomy are developments such as the biofabrication of leather-like material using fungi, fungal cotton substitutes, and renewable fibers from fungal cell walls.

Textile fibres can be formed in chemical processes from bio-based materials. These fibres are called bio-based regenerated fibres. The oldest regenerated fibres are viscose and rayon, produced in the 19th century. The first industrial processes used a large amount of wood as raw material, as well as harmful chemicals and water. Later the process of regenerating fibres developed to reduce the use of raw materials, chemicals, water and energy.

In the 1990s the first more sustainable regenerated fibres, e.g. Lyocell, entered the market with the commercial name of Tencel. The production process uses wood cellulose and it processes the fibre without harmful chemicals.

The next generation of regenerated fibres are under development. The production processes use less or no chemicals, and the water consumption is also diminished.

=== Emerging sub-fields ===
The scope of bioeconomy continues to expand with emerging specialized domains. One such area is immunitary bioeconomy, which analyzes economic models and consumer behavior in markets for immune system-based products and services. This includes studying market dynamics and decision-making processes for biological products such as cord blood banking.

== Issues ==
=== Degrowth, green growth and circular economy ===
The bioeconomy has largely been associated with visions of "green growth". A study found that a "circular bioeconomy" may be "necessary to build a carbon neutral future in line with the climate objectives of the Paris Agreement". However, some are concerned that with a focus or reliance on technological progress a fundamentally unsustainable socioeconomic model might be maintained rather than be changed. Some are concerned it that may not lead to an ecologization of the economy but to an economization of the biological, "the living" and caution that potentials of non-bio-based techniques to achieve greater sustainability need to be considered. A study found that the, as of 2019, current EU interpretation of the bioeconomy is "diametrically opposite to the original narrative of Baranoff and Georgescu-Roegen that told us that expanding the share of activities based on renewable resources in the economy would slow down economic growth and set strict limits on the overall expansion of the economy". Furthermore, some caution that "Silicon Valley and food corporations" could use bioeconomy technologies for greenwashing and monopoly-concentrations. The bioeconomy, its potentials, disruptive new modes of production and innovations may distract from the need for systemic structural socioeconomic changes and provide a false illusion of technocapitalist utopianism/optimism that suggests technological fixes may make it possible to sustain contemporary patterns and structures, pre-empting structural changes.

=== Unemployment and work reallocation ===
Many farmers depend on conventional methods of producing crops and many of them live in developing economies. Cellular agriculture for products such as synthetic coffee could, if the contemporary socioeconomic context (the socioeconomic system's mechanisms such as incentives and resource distribution mechanisms like markets) remains unaltered (e.g. in nature, purposes, scopes, limits and degrees), threaten their employment and livelihoods as well as the respective nation's economy and social stability. A study concluded that "given the expertise required and the high investment costs of the innovation, it seems unlikely that cultured meat immediately benefits the poor in developing countries" and emphasized that animal agriculture is often essential for the subsistence for farmers in poor countries. However, not only developing countries may be affected.

=== Patents, intellectual property and monopolies ===
Observers worry that the bioeconomy will become as opaque and free of accountability as the industry it attempts to replace, that is the current food system. The fear is that its core products will be mass-produced, nutritionally dubious meat sold at the homogeneous fast-food joints of the future.

The medical community has warned that gene patents can inhibit the practice of medicine and progress of science. This can also apply to other areas where patents and private intellectual property licenses are being used, often entirely preventing the use and continued development of knowledge and techniques for many years or decades. On the other hand, some worry that without intellectual property protection as the type of R&D-incentive, particularly to current degrees and extents, companies would no longer have the resources or motives/incentives to perform competitive, viable biotech research – as otherwise they may not be able to generate sufficient returns from initial R&D investment or less returns than from other expenditures that are possible. "Biopiracy" refers to "the use of intellectual property systems to legitimize the exclusive ownership and control over biological resources and biological products that have been used over centuries in non-industrialized cultures".

Rather than leading to sustainable, healthy, inexpensive, safe, accessible food being produced with little labor locally – after knowledge- and technology transfer and timely, efficient innovation – the bioeconomy may lead to aggressive monopoly-formation and exacerbated inequality. For instance, while production costs may be minimal, costs – including of medicine – may be high.

=== Innovation management, public spending and governance ===
It has been argued that public investment would be a tool governments should use to regulate and license cellular agriculture. Private firms and venture capital would likely seek to maximise investor value rather than social welfare. Moreover, radical innovation is considered to be more risky, "and likely involves more information asymmetry, so that private financial markets may imperfectly manage these frictions". Governments may also help to coordinate "since several innovators may be needed to push the knowledge frontier and make the market profitable, but no single company wants to make the early necessary investments". And investments in the relevant sectors seem to be a bottleneck hindering the transition toward a bioeconomy. Governments could also help innovators that lack the network "to naturally obtain the visibility and political influence necessary to obtain public funds" and could help determine relevant laws. By establishing supporting infrastructure for entrepreneurial ecosystems they can help creating a beneficial environment for innovative bioeconomy startups. Enabling such bioeconomy startups to act on the opportunities provided through the bioeconomy transformation further contributes to its success.

== In popular media ==
Biopunk – so called due to similarity with cyberpunk – is a genre of science fiction that often thematizes the bioeconomy as well as its potential issues and technologies. The novel The Windup Girl portrays a society driven by a ruthless bioeconomy and ailing under climate change. In the more recent novel Change Agent prevalent black market clinics offer wealthy people unauthorized human genetic enhancement services and e.g. custom narcotics are 3D-printed locally or smuggled with soft robots. Solarpunk is another emerging genre that focuses on the relationship between human societies and the environment and also addresses many of the bioeconomy's issues and technologies such as genetic engineering, synthetic meat and commodification.

== See also ==
- Bioremediation
- Biosynthesis
- Chemurgy
- Cross-laminated timber
- Degrowth
- Digital economy
- European Green Deal
- Plyscraper
- Oleochemical
- Open innovation
- Single-cell protein
- Synthetic ivory
- Straw-bale construction
- Timeline of biotechnology
- Wood-frame building
- Working animal
