= Single-cell protein =

Edible unicellular microorganisms

Single-cell proteins (SCP) or microbial proteins refer to edible unicellular microorganisms. (Note: Here "protein" is used in the sense of the food group, i.e. food with high protein content.) The biomass or protein extract from pure or mixed cultures of algae, yeast, filamentous fungi or bacteria may be used as an ingredient or a substitute for protein-rich foods, and is suitable for human consumption or as animal feeds. Industrial agriculture is marked by a high water footprint, high land use, biodiversity destruction, general environmental degradation and contributes to climate change by emission of a third of all greenhouse gases; production of SCP does not necessarily exhibit any of these serious drawbacks. As of today, SCP is commonly grown on agricultural waste products, and as such inherits the ecological footprint and water footprint of industrial agriculture. However, SCP may also be produced entirely independent of agricultural waste products through autotrophic growth. Thanks to the high diversity of microbial metabolism, autotrophic SCP provides several different modes of growth, versatile options of nutrients recycling, and a substantially increased efficiency compared to crops. A 2021 publication showed that photovoltaic-driven microbial protein production could use 10 times less land for an equivalent amount of protein compared to soybean cultivation.

With the world population reaching 9 billion by 2050, there is strong evidence that agriculture will not be able to meet demand and that there is serious risk of food shortage. Autotrophic SCP represents options of fail-safe mass food-production which can produce food reliably even under harsh climate conditions.

== History ==
In 1781, processes for preparing highly concentrated forms of yeast were established. Research on Single Cell Protein Technology started more than a century ago when Max Delbrück and his colleagues found out the high value of surplus brewer's yeast as a feeding supplement for animals. During World War I and World War II, yeast-SCP was employed on a large scale in Germany to counteract food shortages during the war. Inventions for SCP production often represented milestones for biotechnology in general: for example, in 1919, Sak in Denmark and Hayduck in Germany invented a method named, “Zulaufverfahren”, (fed-batch) in which sugar solution was fed continuously to an aerated suspension of yeast instead of adding yeast to diluted sugar solution once (batch). In post war period, the Food and Agriculture Organization of the United Nations (FAO) emphasized on hunger and malnutrition problems of the world in 1960 and introduced the concept of protein gap, showing that 25% of the world population had a deficiency of protein intake in their diet. It was also feared that agricultural production would fail to meet the increasing demands of food by humanity. By the mid-1960s, almost quarter of a million tons of food yeast were being produced in different parts of the world and Soviet Union alone produced some 900,000 tons by 1970 of food and fodder yeast.

In the 1960s, researchers at BP developed what they called "proteins-from-oil process": a technology for producing single-cell protein by yeast fed by waxy n-paraffins, a byproduct of oil refineries. Initial research work was done by Alfred Champagnat at BP's Lavera Refinery in France; a small pilot plant there started operations in March 1963, and the same construction of the second pilot plant, at Grangemouth Oil Refinery in Britain, was authorized.

The term SCP was coined in 1966 by Carroll L. Wilson of MIT.

The "food from oil" idea became quite popular by the 1970s, with Champagnat being awarded the UNESCO Science Prize in 1976, and paraffin-fed yeast facilities being built in a number of countries. The primary use of the product was as poultry and cattle feed.

The Soviets were particularly enthusiastic, opening large "BVK" (belkovo-vitaminny kontsentrat, i.e., "protein-vitamin concentrate") plants next to their oil refineries in Kstovo (1973) and Kirishi (1974). The Soviet Ministry of Microbiological Industry had eight plants of this kind by 1989. However, due to concerns of toxicity of alkanes in SCP and pressured by the environmentalist movements, the government decided to close them down, or convert to some other microbiological processes.

Quorn is a range of vegetarian and vegan meat-substitutes made from Fusarium venenatum mycoprotein, sold in Europe and North America.

Another type of single cell protein-based meat analogue (which does not use fungi however but rather bacteria) is Calysta. Other producers are Unibio (Denmark) Circe Biotechnologie (Austria) and String Bio (India).

SCP has been argued to be a source of alternative or resilient food.

== Production process ==
Single-cell proteins develop when microbes ferment waste materials (including wood, straw, cannery and food-processing wastes, residues from alcohol production, hydrocarbons, or human and animal excreta). With 'electric food' processes the inputs are electricity, CO_{2} and trace minerals and chemicals such as fertiliser. It is also possible to derive SCP from natural gas to use as a resilient food. Similarly SCP can be derived from waste plastic by upcycling.

The problem with extracting single-cell proteins from waste products is the dilution and cost. They are found in very low concentrations, usually less than 5%. Engineers have developed ways to increase the concentrations including centrifugation, flotation, precipitation, coagulation, and filtration, or the use of semi-permeable membranes.

The single-cell protein must be dehydrated to approximately 10% moisture content and/or acidified to aid in storage and prevent spoilage. The methods to increase the concentrations to adequate levels and the de-watering process require equipment that is expensive and not always suitable for small-scale operations. It is economically prudent to feed the product locally and soon after it is produced.

== Microorganisms ==
Microbes employed include (brand names in parentheses for commercialized examples):

- Fungi excluding mushrooms (Mycoprotein)
  - Yeast, which truly grow as single cells
    - Saccharomyces cerevisiae
    - Yarrowia lipolytica
    - Cyberlindnera jadinii
    - Kluyveromyces marxianus
    - Komagataella phaffii (= P. pastoris)
    - Candida utilis
    - Torulopsis corallina
    - Geotrichum candidum
  - Filamentous fungi, which form hyphae but still fit in bioreactors
    - Aspergillus oryzae
    - Fusarium venenatum (Quorn)
    - Neurospora crassa
    - Neurospora intermedia
    - Sclerotium rolfsii
    - Trichoderma
    - Scytalidium acidophilum
- Bacteria
  - Pseudomonadota (Proteobacteria)
    - Pseudomonadota that are purple bacteria
      - Rhodobacter capsulatus
      - Rhodobacter sphaeroides
      - Rhodopseudomonas palustris
    - Methylophilus methylotrophus
    - Methylococcus capsulatus
    - Cupriavidus necator
    - Xanthobacter sp. SoF1 (Solein)
  - Cyanobacteria ("blue-green algae"):
    - Spirulina (Limnospira platensis, L. fusiformis, L. maxima and L. indica).
    - Aphanizomenon flos-aquae
- Algae (photosynthetic eukaryotes):
  - Chlorella
  - Dunaliella salina
  - Chlamydomonas reinhardtii
  - Porphyridium cruentum

== Properties ==
Large-scale production of microbial biomass has many advantages over the traditional methods for producing proteins for food or feed.

1. Microorganisms have a much higher growth rate (algae: 2–6 hours, yeast: 1–3 hours, bacteria: 0.5–2 hours). This also allows selection for strains with high yield and good nutritional composition more quickly and easily compared to breeding.
2. Whereas large parts of crops, such as stems, leaves and roots, are not edible, single-cell microorganisms can be used entirely. Whereas parts of the edible fraction of crops are indigestible, many microorganisms are digestible at a much higher fraction.
3. Microorganisms usually have a much higher protein content of 30–70% in the dry mass than vegetables or grains. The amino acid profiles of many SCP microorganisms often have excellent nutritional quality, comparable to hen's eggs.
4. Some microorganisms can build vitamins and nutrients which eukaryotic organisms such as plants cannot produce or not produce in significant amounts, including vitamin B12.
5. Microorganisms can utilize a broad spectrum of raw materials as carbon sources including alkanes, methanol, methane, ethanol and sugars. What was considered "waste product" often can be reclaimed as nutrients and support growth of edible microorganisms.
  - Like plants, autotrophic microorganisms are capable of growing on CO_{2}. Some of them, such as bacteria with the Wood–Ljungdahl pathway or the reductive TCA can fix CO_{2} with efficiencies ranging from 2-3 times to 10 times more efficiently than plants, when also considering the effects of photoinhibition.
6. Some bacteria, such as several homoacetogenic clostridia, are capable of performing syngas fermentation. This means they can metabolize synthesis gas, a gas mixture of CO, H_{2} and CO_{2} that can be made by gasification of residual intractable biowastes such as lignocellulose.
  - Some bacteria are diazotrophic, i.e. they can fix N_{2} from the air and are thus independent of chemical N-fertilizer, whose production, utilization and degradation causes tremendous harm to the environment, deteriorates public health, and fosters climate change.
  - Many bacteria can utilize H_{2} for energy supply, using enzymes called hydrogenases. Whereas hydrogenases are normally highly O_{2}-sensitive, some bacteria are capable of performing O_{2}-dependent respiration of H_{2}. This feature allows autotrophic bacteria to grow on CO_{2} without light at a fast growth rate. Since H_{2} can be made efficiently by water electrolysis, in a manner of speaking, those bacteria can be "powered by electricity".
7. Microbial biomass production is independent of seasonal and climatic variations, and can easily be shielded from extreme weather events that are expected to cause crop failures with the ongoing climate-change. Light-independent microorganisms such as yeasts can continue to grow at night.
8. Cultivation of microorganisms generally has a much lower water footprint than agricultural food production. Whereas the global average blue-green water footprint (irrigation, surface, ground and rain water) of crops reaches about 1800 liters per kg crop due to evaporation, transpiration, drainage and runoff, closed bioreactors producing SCP exhibits none of these causes.
9. Cultivation of microorganisms does not require fertile soil and therefore does not compete with agriculture. Thanks to the low water requirements, SCP cultivation can even be done in dry climates with infertile soil and may provide a means of fail-safe food supply in arid countries.
10. Photosynthetic microorganisms can reach a higher solar-energy-conversion efficiency than plants, because in photobioreactors supply of water, CO_{2} and a balanced light distribution can be tightly controlled.
11. Unlike agricultural products which are processed towards a desired quality, it is easier with microorganisms to direct production towards a desired quality. Instead of extracting amino acids from soy beans and throwing away half of the plant body in the process, microorganisms can be genetically modified to overproduce or even secrete a particular amino acid. However, in order to keep a good consumer acceptance, it is usually easier to obtain similar results by screening for microorganisms which already have the desired trait or train them via selective adaptation.

Although SCP shows very attractive features as a nutrient for humans, however there are some problems that deter its adoption on global basis:

- Fast growing microorganisms such as bacteria and yeast have a high concentration of nucleic acid, notably RNA. Levels must be limited in the diets of monogastric animals to <50 g per day. Ingestion of purine compounds arising from RNA breakdown leads to increased plasma levels of uric acid, which can cause gout and kidney stones. Uric acid can be converted to allantoin, which is excreted in urine. Nucleic acid removal is not necessary from animal feeds but is from human foods (humans have lost parts of the uric acid catabolic pathway during their evolution).

This problem can be remediated, however. One common method consists in a heat treatment which kills the cells, inactivates proteases and allows endogenous RNases to hydrolyse RNA with release of nucleotides from cell to culture broth.

- Similar to plant cells, the cell wall of some microorganisms such as algae and yeast contains indigestible components, such as cellulose. The cells of some kind of SCP should be broken up in order to liberate the cell interior and allow complete digestion.
- Some kind of SCP exhibits unpleasant color and flavors.
- Depending on the kind of SCP and the cultivation conditions, care must be taken to prevent and control contamination by other microorganisms because contaminants may produce toxins such as mycotoxins or cyanotoxins. An interesting approach to address this problem was proposed with the fungus Scytalidium acidophilum which grows at a pH as low as 1, outside the tolerance of most microorganisms. This allows it to grow on acid-hydrolysed paper waste at low-cost.
- Some yeast and fungal proteins are deficient in methionine.

== See also ==
- Solein: a single cell protein made by Solar Foods Ltd. Finland-based.
- Kiverdi, Inc and subsidiary Air Protein by Lisa Dyson. California-based.
- Avecom - Belgium-based
- Unibio - Denmark-based
- Calysta - California-based
- Circe Biotechnologie - Austria-based
- Superbrewed Food (formerly White Dog Labs). Delaware-based
- Deep Branch - UK-based
- LanzaTech
- Nature's Fynd - Chicago-based
- Kyanos
- NovoNutrients
- Deep Branch Biotechnology
- Fermentative hydrogen production
- Hydrogenotrophs
- Alternative foods
- Microbial food cultures
