= Microfungi =

Informal group of fungi

Microfungi or micromycetes are fungi—eukaryotic organisms such as molds, mildews and rusts—which have microscopic spore-producing structures. They exhibit tube tip-growth and have cell walls composed of chitin, a polymer of N-acetylglucosamine. Microfungi are a paraphyletic group, distinguished from macrofungi only by the absence of a large, multicellular fruiting body. They are ubiquitous in all terrestrial and freshwater and marine environments, and grow in plants, soil, water, insects, cattle rumens, hair, and skin. Most of the fungal body consists of microscopic threads, called hyphae, extending through the substrate in which it grows. The mycelia of microfungi produce spores that are carried by the air, spreading the fungus.

Many microfungi species are benign, existing as soil saprotrophs, for example, largely unobserved by humans. Many thousands of microfungal species occur in lichens, forming symbiotic relationships with algae. Other microfungi, such as those of the genera Penicillium, Aspergillus and Neurospora, were first discovered as molds causing spoilage of fruit and bread.

Certain species have commercial value. Penicillium species are used in the manufacture of blue cheeses and as the source of the antibiotic penicillin, discovered by Sir Alexander Fleming in 1928, while Fusarium venenatum is used to produce Quorn, a mycoprotein food product.

== Role in disease ==
Microfungi can be harmful, causing diseases of plants, animals and humans with varying degrees of severity and economic impact. The irritating human skin disease known as athlete's foot or tinea pedis is caused by species of the microfungal genus Trichophyton. Microfungi may cause diseases of crops and trees which range in severity from mild to disastrous, and in economic importance from beneficial to seriously costly. The mold Botrytis cinerea can cause spoilage of crops including grapes, but is also responsible for the "noble rot", which concentrates sugars in the grapes used to make the intensely sweet and concentrated Sauternes dessert wines from the Bordeaux region of France. Dutch elm disease, which has ravaged elms across Europe and North America in the last 50 years, is caused by the microfungi of the genus Ophiostoma. Rice blast, a devastating fungal disease of cereals including rice, wheat and millet, is caused by the phytopathogenic Ascomycete fungus Magnaporthe grisea. In the built environment, the toxic fungus Stachybotrys chartarum causes damage to damp walls and furnishings, and may be responsible for sick building syndrome.

Types of epidermal microfungal infections are:

- Yeast infection
- Athlete's foot
- Mycosis
- Tinea
- Candida

== Diversity ==
Within the United States, approximately 13,000 species of microfungi on plants or plant products are thought to exist. Specimens of microfungi are housed in the U.S. National Fungus Collections and other institutions like herbaria and culture collections that serve as reservoirs of information and documentation about the nation's natural heritage. Based on the number of species reported in the literature and those represented in the collections; the number of microfungi known in the United States is estimated at 29,000 species. In certain areas of the temperate northern hemisphere where fungi have been well studied, the ratio of vascular plant to fungal species is about 6 to 1. This suggests that there may be as many as 120,000 species of fungi within the United States, surpassing the 29,000 U.S. species of microfungi estimated based on collection and literature data, and 1.5 million worldwide. However, as of 1991, the microfungi of the tropical United States had not been well studied.
