= Microbial food cultures =

Live bacteria, yeasts, or moulds used in food production

Microbial food cultures are live bacteria, yeasts or moulds used in food production. Microbial food cultures carry out the fermentation process in foodstuffs. Used by humans since the Neolithic period (around 10,000 years BCE) fermentation helps to preserve perishable foods and to improve their nutritional and organoleptic qualities (in this case, taste, sight, smell, touch). As of 1995, fermented food represented between one quarter and one third of food consumed in Central Europe. More than 260 different species of microbial food culture are identified and described for their beneficial use in fermented food products globally, showing the importance of their use.

The scientific rationale of the function of microbes in fermentation started to be built with the discoveries of Louis Pasteur in the second half of the 19th century. Extensive scientific study continues to characterize microbial food cultures traditionally used in food fermentation taxonomically, physiologically, biochemically and genetically. This allows better understanding and improvement of traditional food processing and opens up new fields of applications.

== Historical overview ==
Microorganisms are the earliest form of life on earth, first evolving more than three billion years ago. Our ancestors discovered the use of microorganisms in food.

Milestones

1665 – Robert Hooke and Antoni Van Leeuwenhoek first observe and describe microorganisms.

1857–1876 – Louis Pasteur proves the function of microorganisms in lactic and alcoholic fermentation.

1881 – Emil Christian Hansen isolates Saccharomyces carlsbergensis, a pure yeast culture, which is today widely used in brewing of lager beers.

1889–1896 – Herbert William Conn, Vilhelm Storch and Hermann Weigmann demonstrate that bacteria are responsible for the acidification of milk and of cream.

1897 – Eduard von Freudenreich isolates Lactobacillus brevis.

1919 – Sigurd Orla-Jensen classifies lactic acid bacteria on the basis of the bacteria's physiological response patterns.

Starting from 1970s – production of first industrial concentrated cultures, frozen or freeze-dried cultures, for the direct inoculation of processed milk, improving the regularity of production processes.

== Function of microbial food cultures in food ==
Microbial food cultures preserve food through formation of inhibitory metabolites such as organic acid (lactic acid, acetic acid, formic acid, propionic acid), ethanol, bacteriocins, etc., often in combination with decrease of water activity (by drying or use of salt). Further, microbial food cultures help to improve food safety through inhibition of pathogens or removing of toxic compounds. Microbial food cultures also improve the nutritional value and organoleptic quality of the food.

The microbial food cultures used in food fermentation can be divided into three major groups: bacteria, yeasts and moulds.

=== Bacteria ===
Bacterial food cultures can be divided into starter cultures and probiotics.

Starter cultures have mainly a technological function in the food manufacturing. They are used as food ingredients at one or more stages in the food manufacturing process and develop the desired metabolic activity during the fermentation or ripening process. They contribute to the one or multiple unique properties of a foodstuff especially in regard to taste, flavour, colour, texture, safety, preservation, nutritional value, wholesomeness and/or health benefits.

Probiotics have a functional role, which refers to the ability of certain microbes to confer health benefits to the consumer.

Generally, the bacteria used as starter culture are not the same used as probiotics. There are, however, cases when one bacterium can be used both as starter culture and as probiotic. The scientific community is presently trying to deepen understanding of the roles played by microbes in food processing and human health.

The most important bacteria in food manufacturing are Lactobacillus species, belonging to the group of lactic acid bacteria.

Bacterial food cultures are responsible for the aroma, taste and texture of cheeses and fermented milk products such as yogurts, ayran, doogh, skyr or ymer. They contribute to developing the flavour and colour of such fermented products as salami, pepperoni and dried ham. Lactic acid bacteria converts the unstable malic acid that is naturally present in wine into the stable lactic acid. This malolactic fermentation gives the stability that is characteristic of high-quality wines that improve on storage.

Lactic acid bacteria are also used in food supplements as probiotics which help to restore the balance in human intestinal biota.

=== Yeasts ===
The most familiar yeast in food production, Saccharomyces cerevisiae, has been used in brewing and baking for thousands of years.

S. cerevisiae feeds on the sugars present in the bread dough and produces the gas carbon dioxide. This forms bubbles within the dough, causing it to expand and the bread to rise.

Several different yeasts are used in brewing beer, where they ferment the sugars present in malted barley to produce alcohol. One of the most common is S. cerevisiae. The same strain of S. cerevisiae which can also be used in breadmaking is used to make ale-type beers. It is known as a top-fermenting yeast because it creates a foam on the top of the brew. Bottom-fermenting yeasts, such as S. pastorianus, are more commonly used to make lagers. They ferment more of the sugars in the mixture than top-fermenting yeasts, which gives a cleaner taste.

The alcohol in wine is formed by the fermentation of the sugars in grape juice, with carbon dioxide as a by-product. Yeast is naturally present on grapeskins, and this alone can be sufficient for the fermentation of sugars to alcohol to occur. A pure yeast culture, most often S. cerevisiae, is usually added to ensure the fermentation is reliable. Other yeast cultures like Pichia, Torulaspora and Kluyveromyces are naturally present or added to create special flavours in the wine. Sparkling wine, including champagne, is made by adding further yeast to the wine when it is bottled. The carbon dioxide formed in this second fermentation is trapped as bubbles.

Yeasts are also used to produce kefir products, semi-soft ripened cheeses and fermented soy drinks.

=== Moulds ===
Three main types of cheese rely on moulds for their characteristic properties: blue cheese, soft ripened cheese (such as camembert and brie) and rind-washed cheese (such as époisses and taleggio).

To make blue cheese, the cheese is treated with a mould, usually Penicillium roqueforti, while it is still in the loosely pressed curd form. As the cheese matures, the mould grows, creating blue veins within it which gives the cheese its characteristic flavour. Examples include stilton, roquefort and gorgonzola.

Soft ripened cheese such as brie and camembert are made by allowing P. camemberti to grow on the outside of the cheese, which causes them to age from the outside in. The mould forms a soft white crust, and the interior becomes runny with a strong flavour.

Rind-washed cheeses like limburger also ripen inwards, but here, as the name suggests, they are washed with brine and other ingredients such as beer and wine which contain mould. This also makes them attractive to bacteria, which add to the flavour.

Traditionally, inoculations of sausages with moulds were done with the indigenous biota of the slaughters. Different moulds (such as P. chrysogenum and P. nalgiovense) can be used to ripen surfaces of sausages. The mould cultures develop the aroma and improve the texture of the sausages. They also contribute to shortening of the ripening period and preserving the natural quality. This expands the shelf life of the meat product.

In the past, soy sauce has been made by mixing soybeans and other grains with a mould (Aspergillus oryzae or A. sojae) and yeast. This mixture was then left to ferment in the sun. Today soy sauce is made under controlled conditions. The key flavour ingredients formed in this process are salts of the amino acid glutamic acid, notably monosodium glutamate.

== Production of microbial food cultures ==
The industrial production of microbial food cultures is carried out after careful selection process and under strictly controlled conditions. First, the microbiology laboratory, where the original strains are kept, prepares the inoculation material, which is a small quantity of microbes of a single (pure) strain. Then, the inoculation material is multiplied and grown either in fermenters (liquid) or on a surface (solid) under defined and monitored conditions. Grown cells of pure culture are harvested, eventually blended with other cultures and, finally, formulated (preserved) for subsequent transportation and storage. They are sold in liquid, frozen or freeze-dried formats.

Another and traditional way of starting a food fermentation is often referred to as spontaneous fermentation. Cultures come from raw milk, i.e. milk that has not undergone any sanitation treatment or from the reuse of a fraction of the previous production (back-slopping). The composition of such cultures is complex and extremely variable. The use of such techniques is steadily decreasing in developed countries. Some countries even prohibit the back-slopping technique because of the "potential to magnify pathogen loads to very dangerous levels".

== Microbial protein ==
Microbial protein (MP) can be created with micro-algae, bacteria, yeasts and microfungi (mycoprotein).

Examples of already available (commercialized) MP products include:

- Quorn
- Solein by Solar Foods

It can substitute meat and feed, mitigating environmental impacts of meat and other animal-based products. It could also substite animal-based protein supplements.

Researchers are working on improving the sustainability and economics of microbial protein production and on solving challenges in scaling up to industrial production.

== Environmental, food security and efficiency aspects ==
A study found that solar-energy-driven production of microbial foods from direct air capture substantially outperforms agricultural cultivation of staple crops in terms of land use. Growing such food from air yielded 10 times more protein and at least twice the calories than growing soybeans with the same amount of land.

A study complements life-cycle assessment studies, showing substantial deforestation reduction (56%) and climate change mitigation if only 20% of per-capita beef was replaced by microbial protein by 2050.

Single-cell protein (SCP) can substitute conventional protein feed. Land shortage and environmental calamities such as droughts or floods aren't a bottleneck in SCP production.

== Safety and regulatory aspects ==
Microbial food cultures are considered as traditional food ingredients and are permitted in the production of foodstuffs all over the world under general food laws.

Commercially available microbial food cultures are sold as preparations, which are formulations, consisting of concentrates of one or more microbial species and/or strains including unavoidable media components carried over from the fermentation and components, which are necessary for their survival, storage, standardisation and to facilitate their application in the food production process.

Safety of microbial food cultures, depending on their characteristics and use, can be based on genus, species or strain levels.

=== Microorganisms with documented history of safe use in food ===
The first (non-exhaustive) inventory of microorganisms with a documented history of use in food was for the first time compiled in 2001 by the International Dairy Federation (IDF) and the European Food and Feed Cultures Association (EFFCA).

In 2012, this inventory was updated. It now covers a wide range of food applications (including dairy, fish, meat, beverages and vinegar) and features a reviewed taxonomy of microorganisms.

=== United States ===
In the United States of America, microbial food cultures are regulated under the Food, Drug and Cosmetic Act. Section 409 of the 1958 Food Additives Amendment of the Food, Drug and Cosmetic Act, exempts from the definition of food additives substances generally recognized by experts as safe (GRAS) under conditions of their intended use. These substances do not require premarket approval by the US Food and Drug Administration.

Because there are various ways to obtain GRAS status for microbial food cultures, there is no exhaustive list of microbial food cultures having GRAS status in the US.

=== European Union ===
In the European Union, microbial food cultures are regarded as food ingredients and are regulated by Regulation 178/2002, commonly referred to as the General Food Law.

Since 2007, the European Food Safety Authority (EFSA) has been maintaining a list of microorganisms having qualified presumption of safety (QPS). The QPS list covers only a limited number of microorganisms, which have been referred to EFSA for safety assessment. It has been conceived as an internal evaluation tool for microorganisms used in the food production chain (e.g. feed cultures, cell factories producing enzymes or additives, plant protection) that need an evaluation by EFSA scientific panels before being marketed in the EU. Microbial food cultures with a long history of safe use are, however, considered to be traditional food ingredients and are legally permitted for use in human food without EFSA evaluation.

==== Denmark ====
From 1974 to 2010 Denmark required premarket approval of microbial food cultures. The positive list of microbial food cultures is available on the website of the Danish Veterinary and Food Administration.

In 2010, the regulation changed. Approval is no longer needed but a notification should be made to the Veterinary and Food Administration.
