= Calysta =

US-based biotechnology firm

- Company type: Private
- Industry: Biotechnology
- Founded: 2012; 14 years ago
- Founder: Josh Silverman
- Headquarters: Menlo Park, California, U.S.
- Key people: Alan Shaw (CEO)
- Products: Protein for animal and fish feed
- Website: calysta.com

Calysta is a privately held biotechnology company based in California that develops and commercializes microbial protein ingredients through gas-fermentation technology for use in animal feed and other food applications. Calysta uses methanotrophic bacteria to ferment methane into single-cell protein ingredients designed for aquaculture and livestock feed applications. It also uses other food ingredients.

Beginning in 2016, Calysta had operated a demonstration plant in Teesside, England, that used methanotroph bacteria to convert methane into FeedKind® single cell protein under a UK government grant. The product received approval for inclusion in fish and livestock feed in the European Union. The facility was later decommissioned as the company shifted away from pilot-scale operations.

Calysta was founded in 2012, based on technology developed by scientists associated with DNA2.0 (now ATUM), a US synthetic biology company. Calysta secured venture funding to commercialize its methane-to-protein technology.

== History ==
Calysta was founded in 2012 in Menlo Park, California by Josh Silverman, and is led by CEO Alan Shaw.

By June 2013, the firm began working with NatureWorks to use methane fermentation to produce lactic acid. Calysta’s methane-based protein fermentation approach builds on earlier research into gas-fermentation processes, including work conducted by Statoil in the 1980s. In 2014, Calysta purchased and further developed the technology for producing animal feed ingredients. Using the ten-million-dollar total funding from investors including Aqua-Spark, Calysta began a study to determine the viability of a mass production facility.

In 2016 Calysta opened a pilot protein production facility in Teesside, England with £2.8 million ($3.7 million) in UK Government support; that site has since been decommissioned as the company focuses on commercial-scale manufacturing in Chongqing, China. In early 2016, the firm announced it had raised $30 million in funding led by Cargill, an American agribusiness corporation.

The firm's Teesside facility opened in September 2016. The facility is dedicated to the production of the company's chief product, "FeedKind protein." The firm raised an additional $40 million in May 2017 from existing and new investors including Japan's Mitsui & Co. and Singapore's Temasek Holdings. The firm recently completed its first commercial scale production facility in Chongqing, China with a capacity of 20,000 tonnes of product per year.

== Operations ==
Calysta's processes rely on methanotrophs (specifically Methylococcus capsulatus) which naturally convert methane into methanol by the enzyme, methane monooxygenase. Calysta’s process uses naturally occurring methanotroph bacteria to produce single-cell protein without genetic modification, intended for use in commercial aquaculture and livestock feeds. Protein produced from methane is being offered as a substitute or supplement in the farmed fish industry which conventionally employs fishmeal and fish oil as its source of protein.

The company's manufacturing facilities have been using natural gas as their source of methane. Plans for a U.S. manufacturing facility reported before 2019 have not been documented in later independent coverage; as of 2025, Calysta’s primary commercial production occurs at its industrial-scale plant in Chongqing, China.
