= Nature's Fynd =

U.S. company making plant-based meat substitutes

The Fynder Group
- Type: Private
- Industry: Biotech
- Founded: November 13, 2012; 13 years ago
- Founder: Thomas Jonas; Mark Kozubal; Yuval Avniel; Rich Macur; Daniel Livny; Matthew Strongin
- Headquarters: Chicago, Illinois, US
- Key people: Thomas Jonas (CEO); Mark Kozubal (CSO); Karuna Rawal (Chief Marketing Officer)
- Website: thefyndergroup.com

The Fynder Group (formerly known as Sustainable Bioproducts LLC and focused on biofuel) is a company that develops microbe-based proteins for meat substitutes and dairy substitutes. The protein is produced by a fungus first identified in geothermal springs in Yellowstone National Park.

Founded in 2012 and based in Chicago, with a research facility in Bozeman, Montana, the company has been funded by a series of federal agencies in the United States (National Science Foundation, Department of Agriculture, Environmental Protection Agency and National Aeronautics and Space Administration) since 2013 and began taking venture capital financing backed by investors including 1955 Capital, ADM, Breakthrough Energy Ventures, Danone, Generation, and Softbank. Nature's Fynd is a wholly own subsidiary of its parent company, The Fynder Group.

== Company and product history ==
In 2009, co-founder and CSO Mark Kozubal was on a NASA-funded study of life in extreme environments that uncovered the "Fy" protein, derived from the acidophilic fungus Fusarium strain flavolapis, originally dubbed MK7, in the geothermal springs of the Supervolcano in Yellowstone National Park. The purpose of the NASA-funded study was to prepare a space probe to search for life on other planets. While still a postdoctoral researcher in February 2012, Kozubal determined that the fungus Fusarium strain flavolapis could be converted into a lipid that could be converted into biodiesel. The company was founded on November 13, 2012, as Sustainable Bioproducts LLC.

Sustainable Bioproducts partnered with Montana State University in 2013 to understand the marketplace fit of MK7, and it has a profit-sharing agreement with Yellowstone in exchange for the right to harvest from its land. It has been funded by SBIR grants from numerous federal agencies: National Science Foundation (Phase I $149,848 in 2013 and Phase II $620,779 in 2014), Department of Agriculture (Phase I $99,989 in 2014), Environmental Protection Agency (Phase I $99,944 in 2014 and Phase II $300,000 in 2015), and National Aeronautics and Space Administration (Phase I $123,809 in 2018 and Phase II $749,939 in 2020), Sustainable Bioproducts co-founder and CEO Thomas Jonas and Kozubal originally teamed up on an effort to use "Fy" to develop a more efficient biofuel but pivoted to food. At one point the company was focused on converting biological waste.

On February 4, 2019, Sustainable Bioproducts announced a $33-million Series A funding round led by Silicon Valley venture firm 1955 Capital. The round was backed by Breakthrough Energy Ventures, a $1 billion fund led by Bill Gates with additional backing from Jeff Bezos, Michael Bloomberg and Richard Branson as well as ADM Ventures, the venture arm of Archer Daniels Midland; Danone Manifesto Ventures, the venture arm of Danone; Lauder Partners; and the Liebelson family office. At the time of its Series A, the 22-employee company was based out of the University of Chicago's Polsky Center for Entrepreneurship and Innovation and believed itself to be two years from commercialization of its solid, liquid or powder products.

In March 2020, Sustainable Bioproducts rebranded as Nature's Fynd and closed an $80-million Series B round that enabled it to move into a 35,000-square-foot (3,300 m^{2}) plant in the Back of the Yards neighborhood near the old Union Stock Yard to produce its geothermal springs-sourced microbe-based product, which has a more efficient production rate and more complete protein than its competitors, and that will join kombucha in the newly evolving fermented consumables category. At the time of the Series B round, which was led by Breakthrough Energy Ventures and Al Gore's Generation Investment Management LLP, Nature's Fynd employed 50 people in the new Chicago production center and research & development office in Bozeman, Montana. The company expected to have 100 employees by the end of 2020. The Chicago production facility was built out with the aim of producing branded consumer products such as animal-free cream cheese, chicken nuggets, beef sliders, pork dumplings and chocolate mousse. Meanwhile, the GRAS application was underway as were product labeling efforts regarding the microbial fermented protein that is fungus-based rather than animal- or plant-based.

In December 2020, the company raised $45 million through venture debt and equipment financing commitments in preparation for its 2021 launch as it expanded and solidified its personnel. This brought its cumulative financial backing to $158 million.

On February 14, Nature's Fynd investor, Bill Gates, discussed the company during his 60 Minutes interview with Anderson Cooper. On February 15, 2021, the company announced its first two products: dairy-free cream cheese and meatless breakfast patties, which it made available for preorder.

== Key personnel ==
- Thomas Jonas, co-founder and chief executive officer, is a Frenchman who previously was a president at MeadWestvaco. He was a former French Air Force officer.
- Mark Kozubal, co-founder and chief scientific officer, is a geomicrobiologist at Montana State University and former NASA-funded researcher.
- Yuval Avniel, co-founder and Director of Intellectual Property & Special Projects is a material scientist and registered patent agent.
- Karuna Rawal, chief marketing officer, joined from Publicis Groupe (parent company of Leo Burnett Worldwide).
- Eleanore Eckstrom, director of product design, was previously a food scientist at Kraft Heinz.

== Science ==
MK7 was originally known as a fungus that consumed algae, produced a lipid byproduct and upon drying it exuded oil. "Fy", which is short for Fusarium str. yellowstonensis, contains a complete protein (has all nine essential amino acids needed for human nutrition) that is believed to have potential use in meatless burgers, dairy substitutes and protein powders. Unlike many alternative proteins, it is itself a food rather than a protein additive to complement other processed ingredients.

Sometimes called Fusarium Spp, the branching network of mycelial filaments forms a proteinaceous facsimile of meat in open trays with basic post processing (drying, pressing, and flavoring) without the need for a bioreactor. The process uses propagation of extremophiles rather than bioengineering, resulting in an end product that is mostly protein with fibers and oils as well as micronutrients vitamin B12, vitamin D, iron and calcium, rather than a substance from which to gather a protein extract. The fermentation is fueled by starches and simple sugars. The fungus-based protein process is far more efficient than either plant-based or animal-based proteins with a season-agnostic biomass doubling time that is measured in hours and is not resource-intensive. Since the process takes 3.5 days, a single baking sheet can produce the equivalent of 30 chickens per year. The company is working with NASA to develop a bioreactor that will employ the Fy microbe in space travel.

== See also ==
- Quorn
- List of meat substitutes
- Protein quality
