= Mycoprotein =

Type of single-cell fungal protein

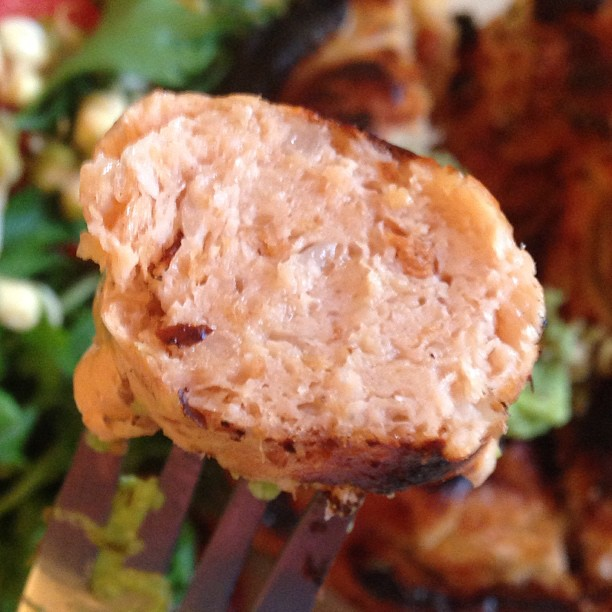
Mycoprotein prepared and served as a meat analogue

Mycoprotein (lit. "protein from fungus"), also known as mycelium-based protein or fungal protein, is a form of single-cell protein derived from fungi for human consumption. Its protein qualities are similar to soy protein, and it is used in some meat substitutes such as Quorn.

== Discovery and commercialization ==
In the mid-1960s, J. Arthur Rank financed research for ways to turn his excess wheat into proteins. His scientists looked at 3000 types of fungi and discovered Fusarium venenatum in 1968 in a compost heap. The fungus was found to grow easily in fermenters. It grows in filaments (long thread-like cells) and effectively transforms starch into a fibrous, meat-like, and protein-rich ingredient.

F. venenatum was the first fungus to be used for the explicit production of mycoprotein. In 1985, Marlow Foods launched the brand Quorn. Other mycoprotein products have been developed since then. For example, the Swedish company Millow, along with the Belgian company NAPLASOL, the Scottish company ENOUGH and the Chinese company Fushine Bio, are developing mycoprotein ingredients. ENOUGH produces the mycoprotein ingredient ABUNDA, utilizing submerged fermentation methods, while Millow uses a dry fermentation method for its mycoprotein production. Danish company Tempty Foods uses mycoprotein in food products alongside ingredients such as quinoa, lentils and oats.

Like plant-based proteins, mycoproteins are used to produce a variety of substitutes for meat products (fish fingers, kebabs, sausage rolls...).

== Production process ==
The mycoprotein is often produced in steel vats called bioreactors. The fungi are grown with a supply of oxygen, nitrogen, carbon, essential vitamins and minerals. Carbon dioxide is drawn from the vat. In the case of F. venenatum, glucose is supplied for carbon and ammonia for nitrogen. Parameters such as stirring, pH and temperature are also essential for optimal growth.

At harvest, the fungus is washed and heat treated to reduce the RNA content according to safety regulations before undergoing further processing steps. Different flavors and tastes can be added to the mycoprotein to add variety.

A reproducible mutation occurs after 1,000 to 1,200 hours of cultivation in F. venenatum that greatly reduces the hypha length in the organism, which is considered unfavorable for production. Under normal conditions, this mutant strain will rapidly displace the parent strain. Replacing ammonia with nitrate as the source of nitrogen, or supplementing ammonium cultures with peptone, prevents this mutant strain from overtaking the product but still allows development. Alternatively, the appearance of the mutant can be delayed by selection pressures such as nutrient concentrations or pH levels.

== Nutrition and health ==
Due to the root-like structure of mycelium, the texture and nutrition of mycoprotein are different from plant proteins, leading to the possibility of creating vegetarian and vegan products with the fibrous texture of meat. The composition also aligns with dietary guidelines as it is high in protein and fiber and low in fat, cholesterol, sodium and sugar. As mentioned in the United Nations Environment Programme (2023), several studies have shown that consumption of mycoprotein has been associated with several health benefits, such as improved blood levels of cholesterol and sugar.

The safety and nutritional value of mycoprotein produced by Marlow Foods for food use in the United States was evaluated using both the FDA Protein Digestibility-Corrected Amino Acid Scoring (PDCAAS) as well as a human volunteer study. The evaluation showed that mycoprotein has an excellent pattern of amino acids, and a PDCAAS score of 0.91 based on an estimate of 78% digestibility, comparable to the scores of beef and soybean. In addition to this, the fatty acid pattern was concluded to be more similar to that of vegetable fat than animal fat, containing a low proportion of saturated fat and a high proportion of mono- and polyunsaturated fat.

Mycoprotein also contains no or very low levels of phytic acids (also known as phytates), which are notorious anti-nutrients present in many plant-based protein sources. This means that in contrast to most beans and legumes, consumption of mycoprotein does not inhibit the absorption of essential trace elements and minerals like iron, zinc, calcium, and manganese.

It has also been found that mycoprotein produced by F. venenatum can consist of up to 42% protein while the fungal β-glucan present may also function as a prebiotic, stimulating the growth of health associated bacteria in the lower gut.

The texture and taste of mycoprotein may vary as different producers use different strains of fungi to produce their unique protein. For example, Nature's Fynd, a company founded in Chicago in 2012, produce their Fy Protein from an extremophile fungus discovered in an acidic hot spring in Yellowstone National Park, whilst Meati Inc. produces since 2022 their MushroomRoom from Neurospora crassa based on patented research by the Better Meat Co. The texture and taste are also influenced by different downstream technology, i.e., the treatment after harvesting the vats. Mycoprotein produced by F. venenatum has, for example, been described as a pale yellow solid with a faint taste of mushrooms.

=== Allergies and hypersensitivity ===
Hypersensitivity reactions caused by ingestion of mycoprotein are very rare, though they have previously occurred in people allergic to mold or other fungi. For most individuals, mycoprotein is safe to eat. 72.4% of the allergic reactions and 67.6% of the gastrointestinal reactions that have been reported after ingestion of a Quorn product occurred on an individual's first consumption of Quorn's products, which is an indication of cross-allergenicity with other antigens. There is, however, continual testing for concerns of allergic reactions, which can range from abdominal pain, nausea, and vomiting to severe asthmatic reactions, especially when crossed with inhaled mold spores.

Some strains involved in mycoprotein production are known to produce mycotoxins in very low concentrations, including some strains of F. venenatum, which in Quorn's case is prohibited by continuous testing every 6th production hour. Fusarium yellowstonensis, on the other hand, is an example of a strain that has been found to have low allergenic potential and no mycotoxins have been detectable.

== Regulation ==
Although mycoprotein is considered a new generation of alternative protein, most microorganisms used to produce mycoprotein have been used for decades, some for centuries, and do not fall under the Novel Food Regulation in the European Union. Mycoprotein has been considered Generally Recognized as Safe (GRAS) by the Food and Drug Administration in the US since 2002. Across the globe, the regulation of mycoproteins lacks uniformity, and dietary guidelines tend to oppose plant-based and animal-based proteins, neglecting other options like mycoproteins. In 2022, mycoprotein producers created the Fungi Protein Association (FPA).

== Environmental impact ==
Several producers of mycoprotein have reported that production of mycoprotein has an environmental impact (including land-use, water consumption and carbon footprint) over 90% less than beef. Additionally, a 2022 study published in Nature found that replacing 20% of per-capita ruminant meat, such as beef, with fermentation-derived microbial protein, such as mycoprotein, could cut global deforestation and carbon dioxide emissions by 50% in addition to lowering methane emissions. These numbers are under the assumption of consumer acceptance.

== See also ==
- Protein quality
- Fusarium
