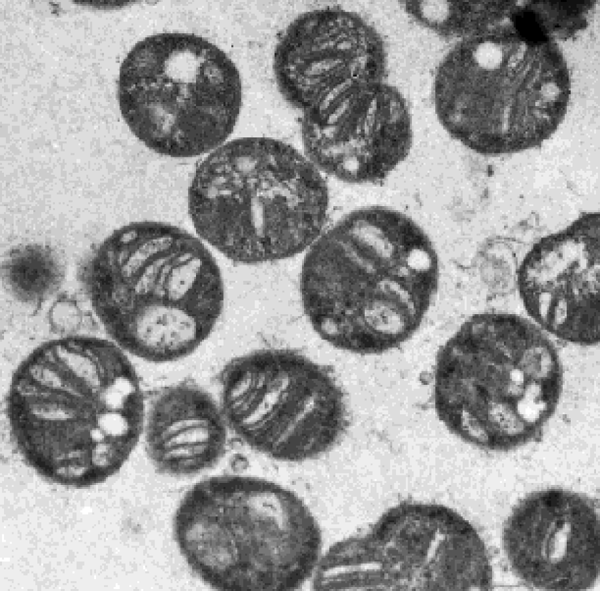

Scientific classification
- Domain: Bacteria
- Kingdom: Pseudomonadati
- Phylum: Pseudomonadota
- Class: Gammaproteobacteria
- Order: Methylococcales
- Family: Methylococcaceae
- Genus: Methylococcus
- Species: M. capsulatus

Binomial name
- Methylococcus capsulatus Foster and Davis 1966 (Approved Lists 1980)

= Methylococcus capsulatus =

Species of bacterium

Methylococcus capsulatus is an obligately methanotrophic gram-negative, non-motile coccoid bacterium. M. capsulatus are thermotolerant; their cells are encapsulated and tend to have a diplococcoid shape. The cell wall is composed of three layers: outer membrane, peptidoglycan layer, and inner membrane. There are extensive intracytoplasmic membranes that are believed to be formed by invaginations of the inner cell membrane. More of these intracytoplasmic membranes are produced when M. capsulatus is grown at a high copper-to-biomass ratio. In addition to methane, M. capsulatus is able to oxidize some organic hydrogen-containing compounds such as methanol. It has been used commercially to produce animal feed from natural gas.

== Metabolism and genetics ==
Methylococcus capsulatus is a Type I methanotroph, meaning that it is a member of the Gammaproteobacteria and that it utilizes the ribulose monophosphate pathway (RuMP) for formaldehyde assimilation. Methane is first oxidized to methanol, which then gets converted into formaldehyde. Formaldehyde can then be (1) further oxidized to formate and carbon dioxide for energy production or (2) assimilated into biomass.

Various strains of M. capsulatus have been isolated and studied, particularly M. capsulatus (Bath), M. capsulatus (Texas) and M. capsulatus (Aberdeen). The genome sequence of M. capsulatus (Bath) is available.

== Growth requirements ==
M. capsulatus has also been demonstrated to be thermotolerant – that is, it can grow well up to 50 °C, though its optimum growth temperature is 37 °C. In addition, M. capsulatus can live in conditions in which there is little molecular oxygen available. Locations where this microorganism can be found, are the stomachs of monogastric species such as pigs, chickens, mink, foxes, and various species of fish like Atlantic salmon, Atlantic halibut, and rainbow trout.

To produce the bacterial protein derived from the methane oxidation process, M. capsulatus must be put into an aerobic fermentation chamber – otherwise known as a loop fermenter. M. capsulatus utilizes 2m^{3} of natural gas per kilogram of dry biomass produced. A culture of heterogenic bacteria should be added to encourage a continuous system in the loop fermenter. Natural gas contains methane, ethane, and propane and needs the following bacterium to metabolize each compound: Methylococcus capsulatus, Brevibacillus agri, and Aneurinibacillus.

== Applications ==
=== Feed production ===
The abundant supply of natural gases, reasonable cost, and cheap transportation allow this food source to be a cost-effective alternative.

A co-culture of bacteria is placed in a continuous loop fermenter with an ammonia additive as a nitrogen source. This could potentially reduce the growth of bacterial protein, so oxygen and mineral solutions are added to the fermenter. The cells that are produced are continuously harvested and processed to create the final "BioProtein" or Bacterial Meal (BM) that is used commercially as an animal feed alternative. Processing of the cells involves them being centrifuged, ultrafiltered, heat-inactivated, and spray-dried. It is important to deactivate the bacteria to reduce potential health risks when the BM is consumed. Although the bacteria used in the co-culture are nonpathogenic, the risks are minimal if processed and consumed without deactivation.

This method of animal feed production is beneficial in mitigating the abundance of natural gas in the atmosphere. Bacterial Meal has been shown to improve the quality of meat in monogastric animals after incorporating BM into their diet. Storage of butchered animal meat has exhibited increased stability and quality of frozen-stored animal meat.

Bacterial Meal contains a high content of nucleic acids, making it unsuitable for human consumption.

=== Commercial use ===
In 1999, Norferm a subsidiary of the Norwegian oil company Statoil, opened a 10,000 tons per year plant to produce animal feed from natural gas from M. capsulatus in Tjeldbergodden, Norway. The plant was shut down in 2006 because it could not sustain operations due to the product's low prices, it had not yet been approved by the EU, and high natural gas prices.

In 2016 Calysta, an American biotech company, opened a plant in Teesside, UK, to produce up to 100 tons of fish feed a year from natural gas using M. capsulatus. The company also announced plans to build a similar plant in Memphis, Tennessee with an eventual capacity of 200,000 ton a year with the agricultural business company Cargill. Another company, Unibio, also opened a plant to produce animal feed from natural gas in 2016 with a capacity of 80 tons per year using M. capsulatus in Kalundborg, Denmark. In 2018 a licensee of Unibio constructed an industrial scale plant in Ivangorod, Russia close to the border of Estonia. The plant has a capacity of 6,000 tonnes of protein per year.
