= Quorn =

Meat substitute based on mycoprotein

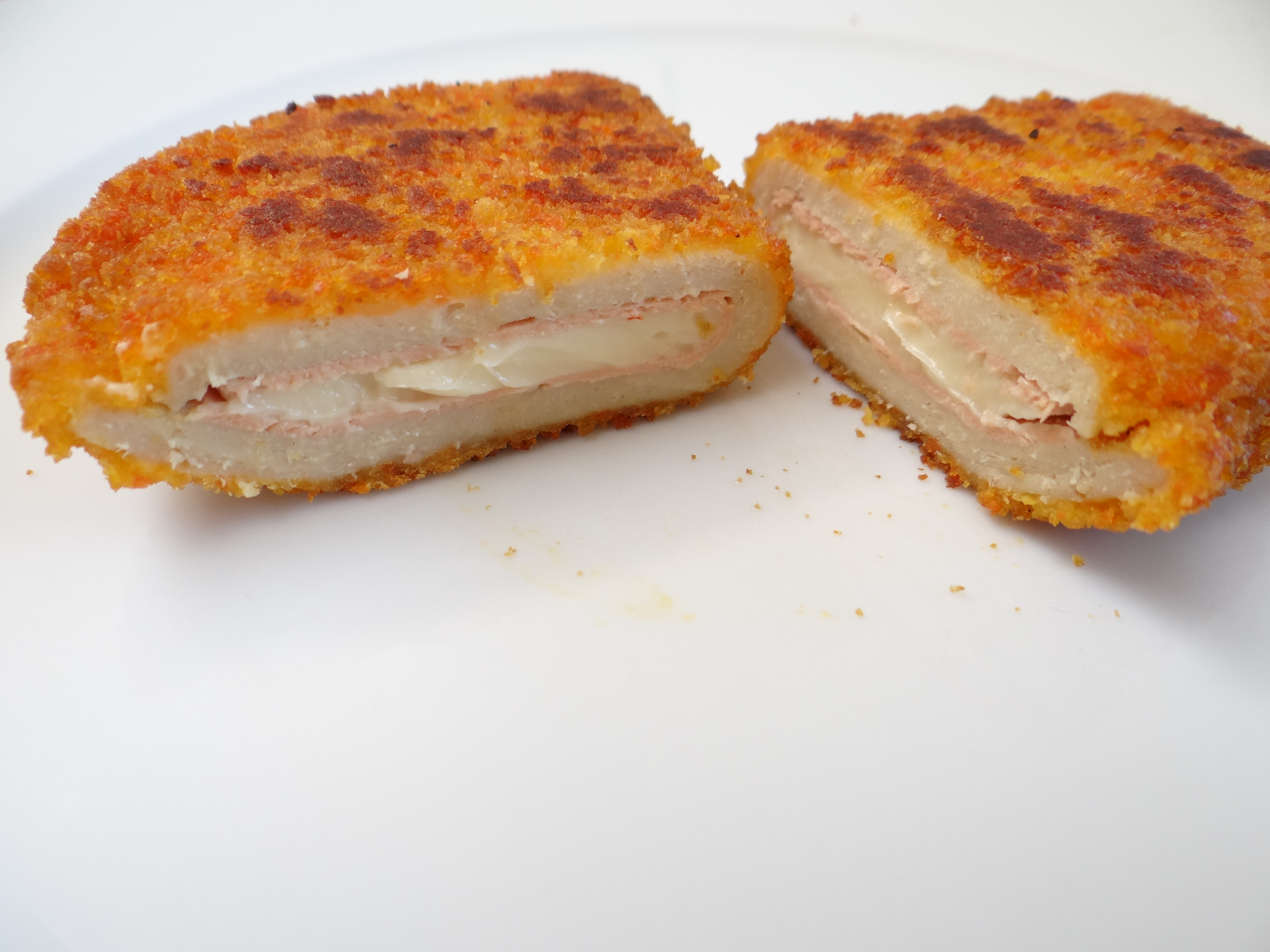
- Quorn cordon bleu product
- Type: Private
- Industry: Food
- Founded: 1985; 41 years ago
- Founder: Marlow Foods Ltd (JV between RHM and ICI)
- Headquarters: Stokesley, North Yorkshire, England
- Area served: Global
- Products: Meat alternatives
- Owner: Monde Nissin Corporation (2015–present)
- Website: www.quorn.co.uk

Quorn is a brand of meat substitute products. Quorn originated in the UK and is sold primarily in Europe, but is available in 11 countries. The brand is owned by parent company Monde Nissin.

Quorn is sold as both a cooking ingredient and as a meat substitute used in a range of prepackaged meals.

Though all Quorn products are vegetarian, not all are vegan. All Quorn foods contain mycoprotein as an ingredient, which is derived from the Fusarium venenatum microfungus. In most Quorn products, the fungus culture is dried and mixed with egg white, which acts as a binder, and then is adjusted in texture and pressed into various forms. The vegan formulation uses potato protein as a binder instead of egg white.

== History ==
Quorn was launched in 1985 by Marlow Foods, a joint venture between Rank Hovis McDougall (RHM) and Imperial Chemical Industries (ICI).

Microbial biomass is produced commercially as single-cell protein (SCP) for human food or animal feed and as viable yeast cells for the baking industry. The industrial production of bakers' yeast started in the early 1900s, and yeast biomass was used as human food in Germany during the First World War. The development of large-scale processes for the production of microbial biomass as a source of commercial protein began in earnest in the late 1960s.

Several of the processes investigated did not come to fruition owing to political and economic problems, but the establishment of the ICI Pruteen process for the production of bacterial SCP for animal feed was a milestone in the development of the fermentation industry. This process used continuous culture on a large scale 1,500 m^{3} (53,000 cu ft). The economics of the production of SCP as animal feed were marginal, which eventually led to the discontinuation of the Pruteen process.

The technical expertise gained from the Pruteen process assisted ICI in collaborating with company Rank Hovis McDougall on a process for the production of fungal biomass for human food. A continuous fermentation process for the production of Fusarium venenatum biomass (marketed as Quorn) was developed using a 40 m^{3} (1,400 cu ft) air-lift fermenter.

During the 1960s, it was predicted that by the 1980s there would be a shortage of protein-rich foods.

The filamentous fungus, Fusarium venenatum, was discovered in a soil sample in 1967. In 1985, RHM was given permission to sell mycoprotein for human consumption after a ten-year evaluation programme.

=== Retail history ===
The brand Quorn was first marketed in 1985 by Marlow Foods (named after Rank Hovis McDougall's headquarters in Marlow, Buckinghamshire), a joint venture between RHM and Imperial Chemical Industries (ICI), which provided a fermenter left vacant from their abandoned single-cell feed programme. The two partners invested in patents for growing and processing the fungus, and other intellectual properties in the brand. The name of the product was taken from a trademark owned by RHM. This trademark was previously used for a range of instant food packets named after the Quorn Hunt, which in turn derives from the Leicestershire village of Quorn.

Quorn entered distribution in the UK in 1993, and it was introduced to other parts of Europe in the 1990s, and to North America in 2002.

== Marketing ==
The initial advertising campaign for Quorn featured sports personalities, including footballer Ryan Giggs, rugby player Will Carling, and Olympic runner Sally Gunnell. In 2013, the company appointed Mo Farah as its ambassador in a marketing push for fitness.

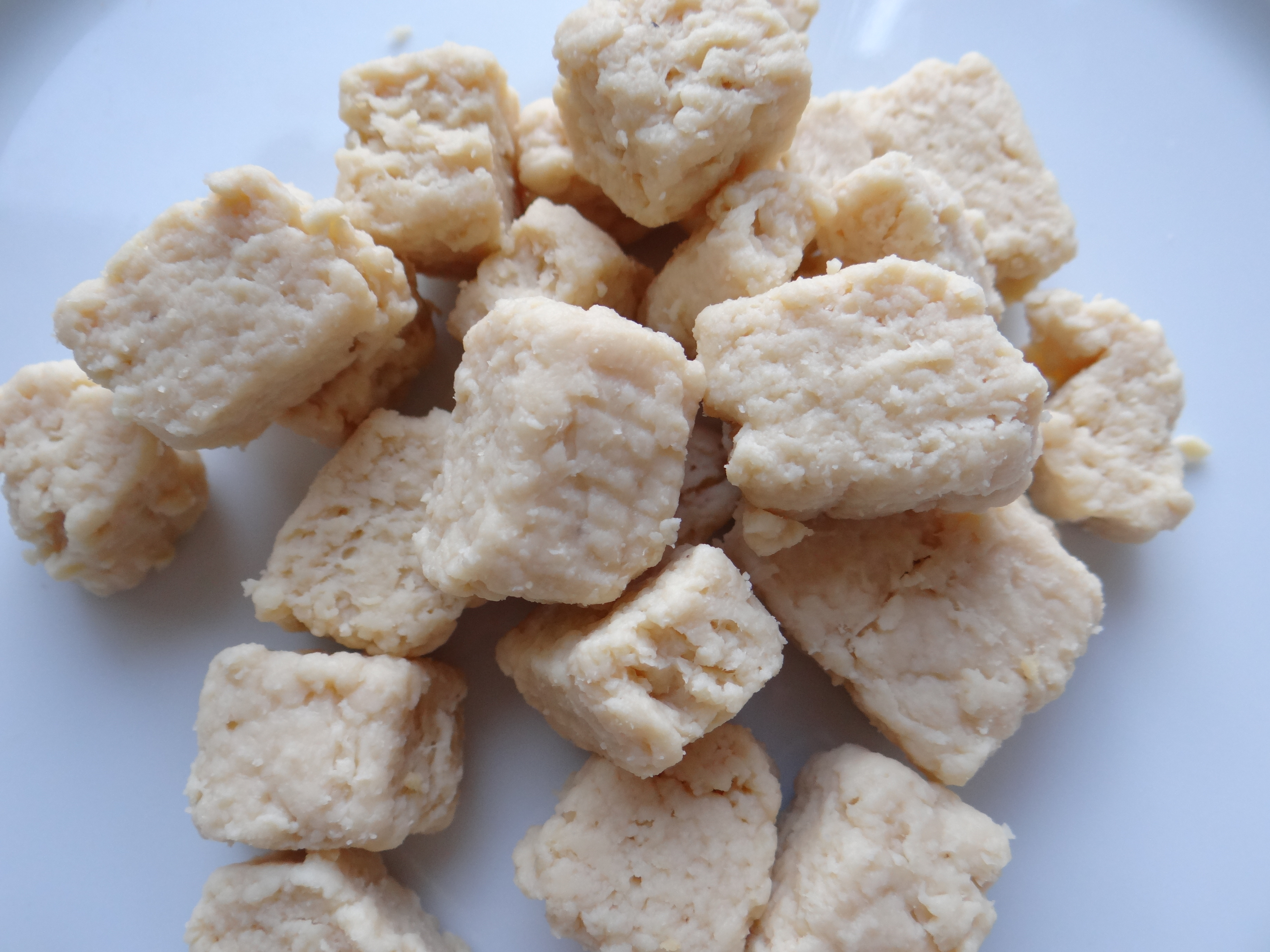
Cubed Quorn

== Products ==
Quorn is sold in ready-to-cook forms, such as cubes and a form resembling minced meat. The company later introduced a range of chilled vegetarian meals, including pizzas, lasagne, cottage pie, and products resembling sliced meat, hot dogs, and burgers. By 2005, Quorn enjoyed around 60% of the meat-replacement food market in the UK, with annual sales of around £95 million. By 2006, it was available in stores in the UK; Europe (Belgium, Denmark, Ireland, Netherlands, Sweden and Switzerland); and North America (Canada and United States). Since June 2010, it has been available in Australia. In May 2012, Quorn Foods opened the German website quorn.de to relaunch Quorn in Germany.

After its producer switched to using free-range eggs as an ingredient, the Vegetarian Society gave the product its seal of approval.

In 2004, McDonald's introduced a Quorn-branded burger bearing the seal of approval of the Vegetarian Society. However, as of 2009, the Quorn burgers were no longer available at any McDonald's restaurant in the UK, and the McPlant was made using Beyond Meat. In 2011, Quorn Foods launched a vegan burger into the United States market, using potato protein as a binder instead of egg albumen, to confer vegan status. According to Quorn's website, by 2020, a number of Quorn items were available in United States markets, many of which are vegan. They also have gluten-free options.

As of 2014, it was reported that most consumers of Quorn are meat eaters rather than vegetarians. As of 2018, the market for Quorn products was said to be increasing worldwide and the company expects further growth. However, six years on parent Monde Nissin is bleeding heavily on its investments on Quorn to the total tune so far of 40 billion Philippine pesos (equivalent to US$690 million).

== Ownership history ==
Originally conceived in 1985 and owned by Marlow Foods, a joint venture between Rank Hovis McDougall (RHM) and Imperial Chemical Industries (ICI), RHM exited the business in 1990 by selling its shares to ICI. When ICI spun off its biological products divisions from the core chemical business in 1993, Marlow Foods became a part of the newly formed Zeneca group, later AstraZeneca.

In 2003, AstraZeneca sold Marlow Foods, including the Quorn business and associated trademarks and patents, to Montagu Private Equity for £72m. Montagu sold the business on to Premier Foods in 2005 for £172m.

In 2011, Premier Foods sold Quorn to Exponent Private Equity and Intermediate Capital Group for £205 million. In 2015, the owners put the company up for sale via a business auction process. Attracting bidders including Danone, Kerry Group, McCain Foods and Nomad Foods, it was sold to Monde Nissin Corporation headquartered in the Philippines for £550m ($831m).

Quorn Mince, 100g
Nutritional value per 100 g (3.5 oz)
- Energy: 384 kJ (92 kcal)
- Carbohydrates: 2.3 g
- Sugars: 0.1 g
- Dietary fibre: 7.5 g
- Fat: 1.7 g
- Saturated: 0.5 g
- Protein: 13 g
Amino acids
Tryptophan	0.18 g
Threonine	0.61 g
Isoleucine	0.57 g
Leucine	0.95 g
Lysine	0.91 g
Methionine	0.23 g
Phenylalanine	0.54 g
Valine	0.60 g
Histidine	0.39 g
Vitamins and minerals
Minerals	Quantity %DV^{†}
Sodium	6% 140 mg
- sources: mycoprotein.org quorn.co.uk
- ^{†}Percentages estimated using US recommendations for adults.

== Production ==
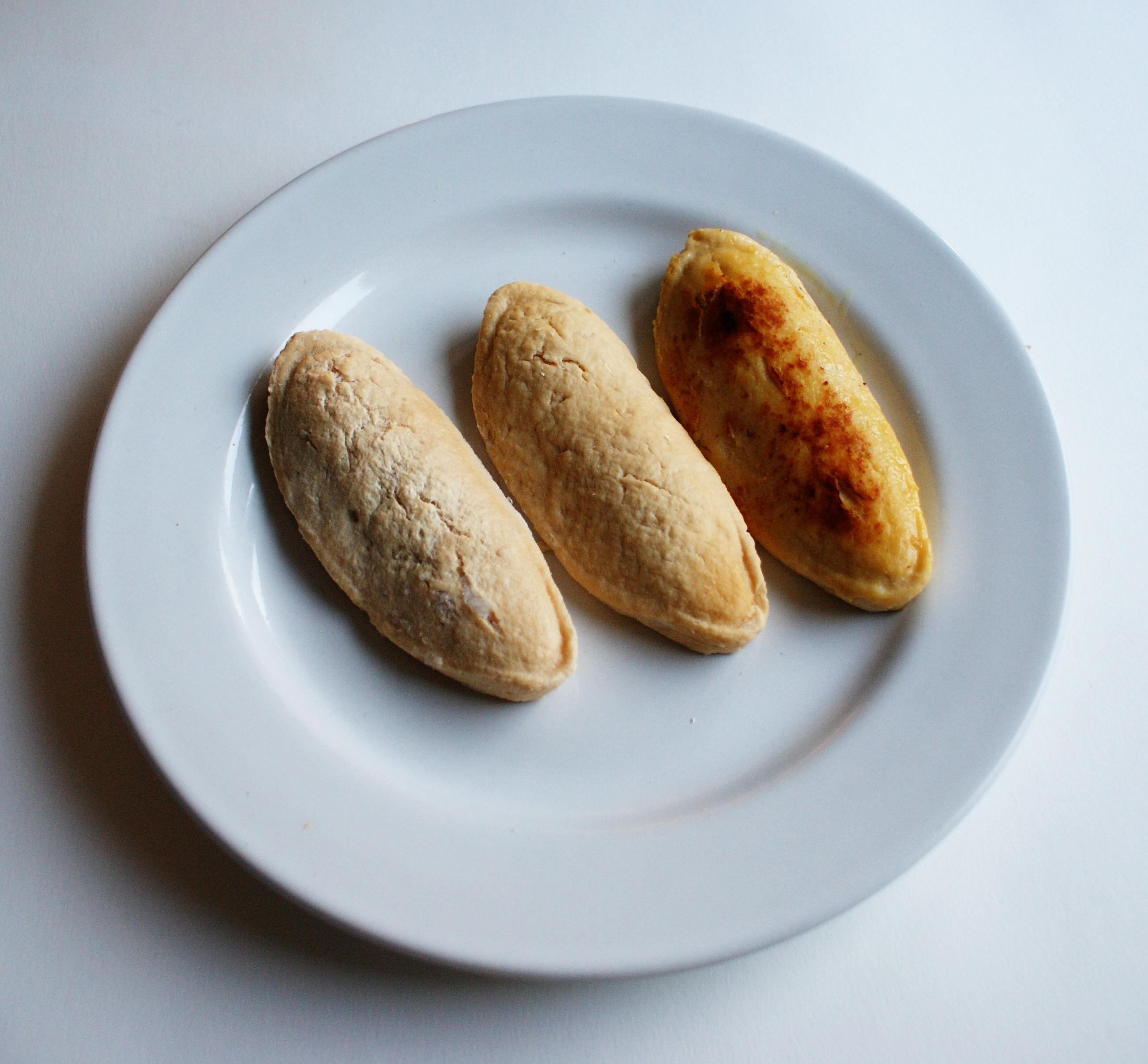
Quorn fillets – frozen, defrosted and fried

Quorn is made from the soil mould Fusarium venenatum strain PTA-2684 (previously misidentified as the parasitic mould Fusarium graminearum). The fungus is grown in continually oxygenated water in large, otherwise sterile fermentation tanks. Glucose and fixed nitrogen are added as a food for the fungus, as are vitamins and minerals to improve the food value of the product. The resulting mycoprotein is then extracted and heat-treated to remove excess levels of RNA. Previous attempts to produce such fermented protein foodstuffs were thwarted by excessive levels of DNA or RNA; without the heat treatment, purines, found in nucleic acids, are metabolised by humans to produce uric acid, which can lead to gout.

The product is dried and mixed with egg albumen, which acts as a binder. It is then textured, giving it some of the grained character of meat, and pressed into a mince resembling ground beef; forms resembling chicken breasts, meatballs, and turkey roasts; or chunks resembling diced chicken breast. In these forms, Quorn has a varying colour and a mild flavour resembling the imitated meat product, and is suitable for use as a replacement for meat in many dishes, such as stews and casseroles.

The final Quorn product is high in protein and dietary fibre and is low in saturated fat. It contains less dietary iron than most meats and the manufacturers have not released much information about additives they use to make Quorn resemble meat. Quorn is considered acceptable in small amounts for babies over nine months old, but should be introduced gradually. The high fibre and low food energy content is better for adults than babies and too much fibre can cause flatulence. The salt content should be checked before giving Quorn to babies, since the salt content varies among products.

The carbon footprint of Quorn Frozen Mince in the UK is claimed to be at least 80% less than that of beef.

Quorn for the UK and European market is produced at Marlow's headquarters in Stokesley, North Yorkshire and at nearby Billingham in Stockton-on-Tees.

== Controversy ==
After Quorn's 2002 debut in the United States, the Center for Science in the Public Interest (CSPI) disputed the original labeling of Quorn as a "mushroom based" product, since Fusarium venenatum is not a mushroom (rather, it is a microfungus). The sale of Quorn was opposed by the American Mushroom Institute, and rival Gardenburger, which filed complaints with advertising and trading-standards watchdogs in Europe and the US, stating Quorn's 'mushroom based' claim was deceptive.

CSPI claimed that Quorn could cause allergic reactions and should be removed from stores. CSPI claimed in 2003 that it "sickens 4.5% of eaters". The manufacturer (Marlow Foods) disputed the figure, claiming that only 0.0007% (1 in 146,000) suffer adverse reactions and that the strain of fungus it uses does not produce toxins. Leslie Bonci, professor of nutrition at the University of Pittsburgh, described CSPI's claims as "overblown". Wendy Preiser, Gardenburger's vice president of marketing, said the company feared that Quorn's labels would cause suspicion about all meat-free products.

The UK's Advertising Standards Authority was concerned that Marlow's marketing of Quorn as "mushroom in origin" was "misleading consumers". Marlow Foods were asked either to delete the claim or modify it to identify its fungal origin.

Quorn formerly used battery eggs in some of its production processes, a practice opposed on ethical grounds by many vegetarians. Working with the Vegetarian Society, which initially did not approve Quorn's products, Marlow began phasing out battery eggs in 2000, and by 2004 all of their UK products were free of battery eggs, earning the Vegetarian Society's seal of approval.

An asthma attack in 2003 was linked to Quorn. Tests showed Quorn to be the only food to which the patient had an allergic reaction. A spokesperson for the Food Standards Agency stated that an allergy was not surprising, due to the high protein content. Former FSA director Jon Bell responded in defence of Quorn, stating that several commonly consumed foods and food ingredients, such as soya, have a much higher intolerance level than Quorn. Adverse reactions were reported for 1 in 146,000 people who ate Quorn, compared to 1 in 35 who ate shellfish and 1 in 350 who ate soya.

== Mycoprotein patent expiration ==
In the European Union, patents expire after 20 years from their filing date. Since the first patent application was filed in 1985, the mycoprotein patents had already expired in 2010 in all European Union countries. Now anyone can legally produce mycoprotein products using the previously patented processes. However, they would have to use other brand names as Marlow Foods maintains ownership of the Quorn brand name. On 14 March 2011, CEO Kevin Brennan said in an interview: "Some patents surrounding the core technology have expired, but the product uses a peculiar fermentation method, and we have 30-plus years' experience in perfecting this on site to produce the product better and at a lower cost. Huge related costs include £30m cost for a fermentation tower and related equipment, so you can't simply look at a patent and say 'there you go'."

== Vegan products ==
In late 2011, the first vegan Quorn product was released, called the Quorn Vegan Burger, available initially only in the United States. Following strong sales of the product and increasing demand from the UK market, Quorn began development of a line of vegan products for the UK market, as well as reducing its use of eggs overall, using 3.5 million fewer eggs since 2010. The first range of vegan Quorn in the UK included eight products and was launched in October 2015.

In January 2019, Quorn produced the filling for a vegan sausage roll sold by UK bakery chain Greggs. The product was consistently sold out, and was identified by the chain as a major contributor to increasing profits and a record share price. In January 2020, Greggs released a Quorn-based vegan "steak bake".

== See also ==
- Cultured meat
- List of meat substitutes
- Textured vegetable protein
