= Fish slaughter =

Killing of fish by humans

Fish slaughter is the process of killing fish, typically after harvesting at sea or from fish farms. At least one trillion fish are killed each year for commercial consumption. Some fish harvesting uses controversial methods like suffocation in air, carbon-dioxide stunning, or ice chilling that have been called inhumane by many organizations such as the World Organisation for Animal Health. However, due to many cultures' reliance on fish, some alternative methods of slaughter have been developed, including percussive stunning, pithing, shooting, and electrical stunning. While these methods are considered effective, they still face criticism, with some arguing that no method of fish slaughter can ever be truly humane.

== Numbers ==
According to the Food and Agriculture Organization (FAO), a total of 156.2 million tons of fish, crustaceans, molluscs, and other aquatic animals were captured in 2011. This is a sum of 93.5 million tons of wild animals and 62.7 million tons of farmed animals. 56.8% of this total was freshwater fish, 6.4% diadromous fish, and 3.2% marine fish, with the remainder being molluscs, crustaceans, and miscellaneous.

The number of individual wild fish killed each year is estimated as 0.97-2.74 trillion (based on FAO tonnage statistics combined with estimated mean weights of fish species). The FAO numbers do not include illegal, unreported and unregulated fishing, nor discarded fish. If these are included and over-reporting by China subtracted, the totals increase by about 16.6% to 33.3%. A similar estimate for the number of farmed fish slaughtered each year is 0.037 to 0.120 trillion.

Mid-sized trout farms in the UK may process more than 10,000 fish per hour. They are often operated by only a few people, and it may be necessary to kill trout on short notice or even at night.

== Welfare indicators ==
The main argument against fish slaughter, and inhumane slaughtering practices, is that fish can feel pain. Sentience is defined as consciousness and an ability to perceive feeling. The degree of fish sentience is a debated topic in many countries. Apparent differences between fish and humans have led to fish welfare being often overlooked in ethical discussions.

Research on fish suffering during slaughter relies on measures to indicate when fish are stressed. Some indicators used by welfare studies include

- Behavior
  - Swimming, gill movement, eye movement in response to body re-orientation, reaction when inverted, etc.
- Electrical measures
  - EEG, ECG, evoked responses, etc.
  - These are quite accurate but also require high levels of expertise.
- Hematic measures
  - Cortisol, plasma glucose, plasma lactate, hematocrit, etc.
- Tissue measures
  - Indicators of stress in the muscle tissue, like lactic acid, pH, and the catabolites of adenosine triphosphate (ATP).
  - These indicators typically also correlate with lower-quality meat.

Following electric stunning, as fish gradually resume consciousness, they begin to make rhythmic gill-cover movements. Based on EEG correlations, it is believed that stunned fish remain insensible until they have resumed rhythmic gill patterns. This can be used as a convenient assessment tool for the effectiveness of electric stunning.

Fish cognition is also more advanced than commonly believed. For example, in studies, some fish showed a capability to remember other fish and places.

== Inhumane methods ==
In 2004, the European Food Safety Authority observed that "Many existing commercial killing methods expose fish to substantial suffering over a prolonged period of time."

The Aquatic Animal Health Code of the World Organisation for Animal Health considers the following slaughter methods inhumane. Some ethicists have gone further and argued that there are no available humane slaughter methods for fish.

=== Air asphyxiation ===
Air asphyxiation is the oldest slaughter method for fish and is considered inhumane because it can take the fish over an hour to die. One Dutch study found that it took 55–250 minutes for various species of fish to become insensible during asphyxiation. Fish that evolved for low-oxygen environments take longer to die. At higher temperatures, fish lose consciousness more quickly.

Meat quality and shelf-life are also diminished when this method is used.

=== Ice bath ===
Also called live chilling, the ice bath method involves putting fish in baths of ice water, where they chill and eventually die of anoxia. Because chilling slows metabolic rate and oxygen needs, it may prolong the duration until death in some instances, with some cold adapted species taking more than an hour to die. On these grounds, the Farm Animal Welfare Council's 1996 report on farmed-fish welfare stated: "The cooling of live trout on ice after they have been removed from water should be prohibited." In contrast, later research suggested that for warm Mediterranean species such as sea bream and sea bass, the method might at least be preferable to air asphyxiation, with fish showing lower levels of stress indicators. Research in 2009 showed that ice water is faster and less stressful than anaesthetics for killing tropical ornamental fishes like zebrafish.

=== CO_{2} narcosis ===
Most often applied for salmon and trout, CO_{2} narcosis involves filling the fish water with CO_{2} to produce acidic pH, which injures the brain. The procedure is apparently stressful, as evidenced by fish swimming vigorously and trying to escape from the tank. CO_{2} immobilizes the fish within 2–4 minutes, but the fish remain conscious until subsequent stunning or killing.

=== Salt or ammonia baths ===
Salting involves application of salt to the container holding the fish, the salt applied should be just enough to weaken the fish. Salting of fish as a slaughtering (killing method) is only applicable to freshwater species.

=== Exsanguination without stunning ===
Exsanguination is the process whereby an animal is cut so that it bleeds to death. Fish are cut in highly vascular body regions, and the process is stressful unless the animals are unconscious. If not stunned, according to behavioral and neural criteria, fish may remain conscious for 15 minutes or more between the time when major blood vessels have been cut and when they lose consciousness. Eel brain activity may not cease for 13–30 minutes after decapitation, and some fish may remain sensible for 20–40 minutes after evisceration.

=== Evisceration without stunning ===
In evisceration without stunning, the fish is simply eviscerated alive without being stunned. The fish is instead restrained until it stops struggling.

== More humane methods ==
=== Percussive stunning ===
Also known as knocking, percussive stunning involves hitting the fish's head with a wooden or plastic club, called a priest. One or two appropriate blows can disrupt the brain sufficiently to render the fish insensible and potentially even kill it directly. However, applying this method correctly requires training and effort. Percussive stunning must be applied one fish at a time and so is typically only used for large fish, such as salmon and trout. If the operator is skilled, percussive stunning can be among the most humane methods and can also yield high meat quality. One comparison of slaughter methods found that percussive stunning had the best welfare performance as measured by low hematocrit, low plasma glucose, low lactate, and high muscle energy charge.

For some fish species, there are automated percussive stunning tools, such as a pneumatic club for salmon. However, building an automated machine to process, orient, percussively stun, and bleed bulk quantities of small fish would be difficult.

=== Pithing ===
Pithing, also known as ikejime (or ikijime), involves sticking a sharp spike through the brain of the fish. If done properly, it can kill quickly, however, if the operator misses the brain, the results may be stressful for the fish, which is why resources such as the ikijime.com database have been developed to define the brain location of many popular fish species. As with percussive stunning, spiking is used to kill one fish at a time and so is mainly used for large species such as tuna and salmon.

=== Shooting ===
Shooting large fish is also possible.

=== Electrical stunning ===
Electricity can be more humane than alternatives if applied correctly. In addition to potentially producing unconsciousness quickly, stunning reduces the stress of restraint and being removed from water.

If electrical parameters are not optimized, electrical stunning may produce immobility without loss of consciousness, which is inhumane. There is little public data comparing optimal stun settings found by researchers with the settings used in commercial slaughter operations, so it is unknown how effective real-world stunning is. In addition, proper stun parameters vary significantly by species.

Electricity may introduce bleedspots, so proper settings are required.

In June 2024, the Centre for Aquaculture Progress, a non-profit organization dedicated to fish welfare in Europe, oversaw a comprehensive study of European consumer attitudes to electrical stunning. The study found that 83% of consumers endorsed pre-slaughter electrical stunning for sea bream and sea bass and that 80% were prepared to pay more for fish that had been slaughtered humanely.

==== Modern systems ====
Systems have been developed to slaughter large numbers of fish whilst maintaining welfare standards.

A paper published by Jeff Lines and his collaborators in 2003 announced that stunning trout for 60 seconds in an electric field of 250 V/m r.m.s. with a sinusoidal waveform of 1,000 Hz rendered them permanently unconscious without degrading meat quality. A stunning system, called HS1, has been developed in accordance with Lines' study. The system first stuns fish and then keeps them unconscious, through electronarcosis, until death. The machine has been widely adopted in the UK, processing an estimated 80% of all UK trout killed for meat. According to the Humane Slaughter Association's James Kirkwood: "Before ten years ago there was no way to humanely kill farmed fish en masse – they died slowly through suffocation when harvested from the water. This welfare benefit affects millions of fish."

== Regulations ==
No welfare standards exist for the trillion or more fish harvested from the wild each year.

Since 2008, Norway has banned CO_{2} stunning. By January 2010, 80% of Norwegian fish-slaughter facilities had switched to either percussive or electrical stunning.

Germany has banned use of salt or ammonia baths.

== See also ==
- Aquaculture
- Animal slaughter
- Commercial fishing
- Fish farming
- Fishing
- Pain in fish
