= Humane Slaughter Act =

United States federal law

- Long title: An Act to establish the use of humane methods of slaughter of livestock as a policy of the United States, and for other purposes.
- Nicknames: Humane Methods of Slaughter Act
- Enacted by: the 85th United States Congress
- Effective: August 26, 1958

Citations
- Public law: 85-765
- Statutes at Large: 72 Stat. 862

Codification
- Titles amended: 7 U.S.C.: Agriculture
- U.S.C. sections created: 7 U.S.C. ch. 48 § 1901 et seq.

Legislative history
- Introduced in the House as H.R. 8308 by William R. Poage (D-TX) on July 9, 1957; Committee consideration by House Agriculture, Senate Agriculture and Forestry; Passed the House on February 4, 1958 (Passed voice vote); Passed the Senate on July 29, 1958 (72-9) with amendment; House agreed to Senate amendment on August 13, 1958 (Agreed voice vote); Signed into law by President Dwight D. Eisenhower on August 27, 1958

The Humane Slaughter Act, or the Humane Methods of Livestock Slaughter Act (P.L. 85-765; 7 U.S.C. 1901 et seq.), is a United States federal law designed to decrease suffering of livestock during slaughter. It was approved on August 27, 1958. The most notable of these requirements is the need to have an animal completely sedated and insensible to pain. This is to minimize the suffering to the point where the animal feels nothing at all, instead blacking out and never waking. This differs from animal to animal as size increases or decreases. Larger animals such as bovines require a stronger method than chickens. For example, bovines require electronarcosis or something equally potent, though electronarcosis remains a standard. The bovine would have a device placed on their head that, once activated, sends an electric current that efficiently and safely stuns them.

Chickens require much less current to be efficiently sedated and are given a run under electrically charged water. To ensure that these guidelines are met, the Food Safety and Inspection Service inspectors at slaughtering plants are responsible for overseeing compliance, and have the authority to stop slaughter lines and order plant employees to take corrective actions. Although more than 168 million chickens (excluding broilers) and around 9 billion broiler chickens are killed for food in the United States yearly, the Humane Slaughter Act specifically mentions only cattle, calves, horses, mules, sheep and swine.

Due to several reports of alleged non-compliance with these regulations and safety protocols, originating in the early 2000s, specifically late 2002, FSIS assigned additional veterinarians to its district offices specifically to monitor slaughter and handling procedures and to report to their headquarters about any issues of compliance. This has been the case ever since, as Congress passed a bill in 2002, The 2002 farm bill, that requires a compliance report to be submitted annually. In 2003, the initiative increased further as, in the FY in 2003, Congress voted in another $5 million operation to the FSIS effort and increased the amount of compliance inspectors by 50.

Language in the FY 2004 consolidated appropriations act directs FSIS to continue fulfilling that mandate, and the FY2005 budget request calls for another $5 million to be allocated for enforcement activities. Despite these requirements in place, reports from January 2004 GAO have noted that there is still alleged non-compliance. These were narrowed down to select states that issues of non-compliance still allegedly persist (GAO-04-247). Earlier concerns about humane treatment of non-ambulatory (downer) cattle at slaughter houses became irrelevant when FSIS issued regulations in January 2004 (69 FR 1892) prohibiting them from being slaughtered for use as human food.

== Content of the Humane Slaughter Act ==
7 U.S.C.A. § 1902. Humane

No method of slaughtering or handling in connection with slaughtering shall be deemed to comply with the public policy of the United States unless it is humane. Either of the following two methods of slaughtering and handling are hereby found to be humane:

(a) in the case of cattle, calves, horses, mules, sheep, swine, and other livestock, all animals are rendered insensible to pain by a single blow or gunshot or an electrical, chemical or other means that is rapid and effective, before being shackled, hoisted, thrown, cast, or cut; or

(b) by slaughtering in accordance with the ritual requirements of the Jewish faith or any other religious faith that prescribes a method of slaughter whereby the animal suffers loss of consciousness by anemia of the brain caused by the simultaneous and instantaneous severance of the carotid arteries with a sharp instrument and handling in connection with such slaughtering.

According to the law, animals should be stunned into unconsciousness prior to their slaughter to ensure a death with less suffering than in killing methods used previously. The most common methods are electrocution and CO_{2} stunning for swine and captive bolt stunning for cattle, sheep, and goats. Of these methods of electrocution, electronarcosis has been widely acclaimed as the safest, most humane and most reliable as well as the surest way to stun the animal and render them insensitive to pain. Organizations such as the Egyptian Fatwa Committee have mutually agreed to this method when keeping the standards of halal a concern. Electronarcosis does not infringe on these standards for halal. Frequent on-site monitoring is necessary, as is the employment of skilled and well-trained personnel. An animal is considered properly stunned when there is no "righting reflex"; that is, the animal must not try to stand up and right themself. Only then can they be considered fully unconscious. They can then proceed down the line, where workers in slaughterhouses can begin the slaughtering of the specified livestock humanely.

For religious sects to proceed in the slaughtering of animals under specifically related rituals, they must fall within compliance of the previously mentioned criterion. No religion is exempt. Many religions find these regulations to fall within their own guidelines as appropriate. The two most common religious slaughter methods in the United States are the method of kosher, of the Jewish faith and the method of halal, of the Muslim faith. While all require that the animal be killed through ritual slaughter, proponents of certain religious-based slaughter methods claim that the severing of the animal's carotid arteries, jugular veins and vagus nerve renders the animal unconscious as effectively as most other methods. In 2018, Temple Grandin stated that kosher slaughter, no matter how well it's done, is not instantaneous, whereas stunning properly with a captive bolt is instantaneous.

== History of the Humane Slaughter Act ==
=== 1958 ===
The first version of the HMSLA was passed in 1958. Public demand for the act was so great that when asked at a press conference whether he would sign it, President Dwight D. Eisenhower stated, "If I went by mail, I'd think no one was interested in anything but humane slaughter." Senator Hubert H. Humphrey was the author of the first humane slaughter bill introduced in the US Congress and chief Senate sponsor of the Federal Humane Slaughter Act, which passed in 1958. National organizations like the Animal Welfare Institute and The Humane Society of the United States supported its passage.

=== 1978 ===
In 1979, the HMSLA was updated and United States Department of Agriculture (USDA) inspectors were given the authority to stop the slaughtering line when cruelty was observed. Officially, slaughtering was not to continue until said cruelty, whether as a result of equipment or of abuses by personnel, was corrected. However, the USDA eventually stopped authorizing USDA inspectors to stop the line, since doing so incurs considerable cost of time for the industry.

=== 2002 ===
On May 13, 2002, President George W. Bush signed the Farm Bill (Public Law 107-171) into law which contains an amendment (section 10305) stating that it was "the sense of Congress that the Secretary of Agriculture should fully enforce" the Humane Slaughter Act.

When introducing the Resolution on the Senate floor, Senator Peter Fitzgerald said:

On April 10, 2001, the Washington Post printed a front page story entitled "They Die Piece by Piece." This graphic article asserted that the United States Department of Agriculture was not appropriately enforcing the Humane Slaughter Act. In response, I am introducing this resolution that encourages the Secretary of Agriculture to fully enforce current law including the Humane Slaughter Act of 1958, as amended by the Federal Meat Inspection Act in 1978. The Humane Slaughter Act requires that animals be rendered insensible to pain before they are slaughtered. However, there are continual reports of alleged non-compliance. For example, the Washington Post has reported that "enforcement records, interviews, videos and worker affidavits describe repeated violations of the Humane Slaughter Act" and "the government took no action against a Texas beef company that was cited 22 times in 1998 for violations that include chopping hooves off live cattle.

=== Amendments to 1958 Act ===
U.S. Congressional amendments and legislative authority pertaining to the Humane Slaughter Act of 1958.

Date of Enactment	Public Law Number	U.S. Statute Citation	U.S. Legislative Bill	U.S. Presidential Administration
June 29, 1960	P.L. 86-547	74 Stat. 255	H.R. 12705	Dwight D. Eisenhower
October 10, 1978	P.L. 95-445	92 Stat. 1069	S. 3092	Jimmy E. Carter
May 13, 2002	P.L. 107-171	116 Stat. 134	H.R. 2646	George W. Bush

== Criticism of the HMSLA ==
=== Exclusionary policies ===
The HMSLA is criticized by animal rights advocates and the Humane Society of the United States for only including cattle, pigs, and sheep but not poultry, fish, rabbits or other animals routinely slaughtered for food. After a 2004 PETA undercover investigation that publicized abuse of chickens by employees of a West Virginia Pilgrim's Pride slaughterhouse that supplied chickens to KFC, PETA was joined by the Humane Society in calling for the Humane Slaughter Act to be expanded to include birds.

== See also ==
- Humane Slaughter Association
- Animal law
- Factory farming
- Islamic ritual slaughter
- Veganism
