= Electronarcosis =

Stupor by applied electric current

Electronarcosis, also called electric stunning or electrostunning, is a profound stupor produced by passing an electric current through the brain. Electronarcosis may be used as a form of electrotherapy in treating certain mental illnesses in humans, or may be used to render livestock unconscious prior to slaughter.

== History ==
In 1902, Stephen Leduc discovered he could produce a narcotic-like state in animals, and eventually, he tried it on himself, where he remained conscious but unable to move in a dream-like state.

In 1951, an American psychiatrist Hervey M. Cleckley published a paper on the results of treating 110 patients having anxiety neuroses with electronarcosis therapy. He argued that patients may benefit from electronarcosis after other treatments have failed.

A 1974 paper discussed the advantage of using electronarcosis for short-term general anesthesia. Researchers achieved electronarcosis by applying 180 mA at a frequency of 500 hertz to the mastoid part of the temporal bone.

== Phases ==
Electronarcosis results in a condition similar to an epileptic seizure, with the three phases called tonic, clonic, and recovery.

- During the tonic phase, the patient or animal collapses and becomes rigid.
- During the clonic, muscles relax and some movement occurs.
- During recovery, the patient or animal becomes aware.

== Livestock ==
Electronarcosis is one of the methods used to render animals unconscious before slaughter and unable to feel pain. Electronarcosis may be followed immediately by electrocution or by bleeding.

Modern electronarcosis is typically performed by applying 200 volts of high frequency alternating current of about 1500 hertz for 3 seconds to the animal's head. A high-frequency current is alleged to not be felt as an electric shock or cause skeletal muscle contractions. A wet animal will pass a current of over an ampere. If other procedures do not follow electronarcosis, the animal will usually recover.

Studies have been used to determine optimal parameters for effective electronarcosis.

== See also ==
- Electrical stunning
- Louise G. Rabinovitch Used electricity on patients as an analgesic.
- Electro-immobilisation
- Electrical water bath stunning
