= Norman Child Graham =

English businessperson, artist, and activist (1859–1931)

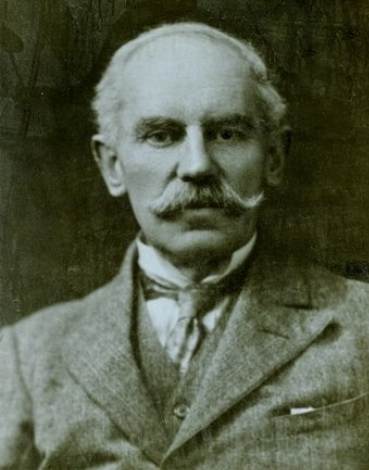
- Born: 21 July 1859; Herne Hill, Surrey, England
- Died: 22 April 1931 (aged 71); Compton, Guildford, England
- Resting place: Woking Crematorium
- Education: Tonbridge School
- Occupations: Businessperson; artist; activist
- Organization: Humane Slaughter of Animals Association
- Spouse: Rose Ransome (m. 1887)

Norman Child Graham (21 July 1859 – 22 April 1931) was an English businessperson, artist, and animal welfare activist. He served as director of Ransomes & Rapier and later worked as a tea merchant and engineer. A watercolourist and member of the Ipswich Fine Art Club, he exhibited works in Merrow and Westminster. Graham co-founded the Humane Slaughter of Animals Association, serving as honorary secretary. He played a key role in its merger into the Council of Justice for Animals and the Humane Slaughter Association, becoming vice-chairman and remaining in the role until his death.

== Biography ==
=== Early and personal life ===
Norman Child Graham was born at Herne Hill, Surrey, on 21 July 1859, the son of Christopher North Graham (1817–1889), a wholesale grocer, and Isabella (née McAndrew; 1825–1897). He was baptised at St Giles' Church, Camberwell, and educated at Tonbridge School.

Graham married Rose Ransome, daughter of Ipswich iron founder Robert James Ransome, at St Mary at Stoke on 1 June 1887.

Graham resided at Priors Wood in Compton, Guildford. He purchased the wood from William Wotton in 1920.

=== Career ===
In the 1890s Graham lived in London and was director of Ransomes & Rapier. He and his brother Christopher were shareholders of the Public Benefit Boot Company. He was a tea merchant in 1901 and was an engineer in general manufacturing in Hambledon, Surrey in 1911.

Graham was a watercolourist and member of Ipswich Fine Art Club from 1898 to 1905. He exhibited his paintings at Merrow in 1898 and Westminster in 1900.

=== Animal welfare ===
Graham co-founded the Humane Slaughter of Animals Association in 1920. He was honorary secretary of the organisation and promoted the use of more humane methods such as the captive bolt pistol for animal slaughter, in opposition to the poleaxe. He commented that "the time will soon arrive when the use of the mechanical killer will be compulsory in the slaughter of all animals for food in this country". The Association worked with the Council of Justice to Animals and amalgamated as the Council of Justice for Animals and the Humane Slaughter Association in 1928. Graham was vice-chairman of the organisation until his death in 1931.

=== Death ===
Graham died at Priors Wood on 22 April 1931, aged 71. His funeral service was held at Woking Crematorium. In his will, he left £3000 to the Council of Justice to Animals, £2000 to the League for the Prohibition of Cruel Sports and £3000 to the RSPCA payable on the condition that they campaign to prevent the hunting of wild animals. He also left £500 each to the Animal Defence and Anti-Vivisection Society, International League Against the Export of Horses for Butchery and the People's Dispensary for Sick Animals of the Poor.
