= Electric fishing =

Electric fishing can refer to one of two methods of fishing:

- Electrofishing, used to draw fish to an anode to be captured
- Electric pulse fishing, where an electric pulse is generated above the sea bed to disturb fish to be captured
