= Preharvest =

Preharvest refers to activities on the farm or ranch that occur before crop or livestock products are sold. Preharvest food safety activities, for example, is a phrase often used to describe USDA’s efforts, through research and cooperative work, to foster changes in on farm production that can reduce public health risks in live animals before they are sent to slaughter.
