= Pulse fishing =

Fisheries management technique

Pulse fishing is a fisheries management technique for preventing fish stocks from being overfished by periodically permitting a cycle of fishing followed by a fallow period which allows stocks to reconstitute. It should not be confused with electric pulse fishing which is a fishing technique which involves pulsing electric currents.
