= Charles Reinhardt =

British physician and writer (1868–1920)

- Born: Charles Emmanuel Reinhardt; 1868
- Died: 1920 (aged 51–52)
- Occupations: Physician, writer

Charles Emmanuel Reinhardt (1868–1920) was a British physician, animal welfare activist and anti-vivisectionist.

== Biography ==
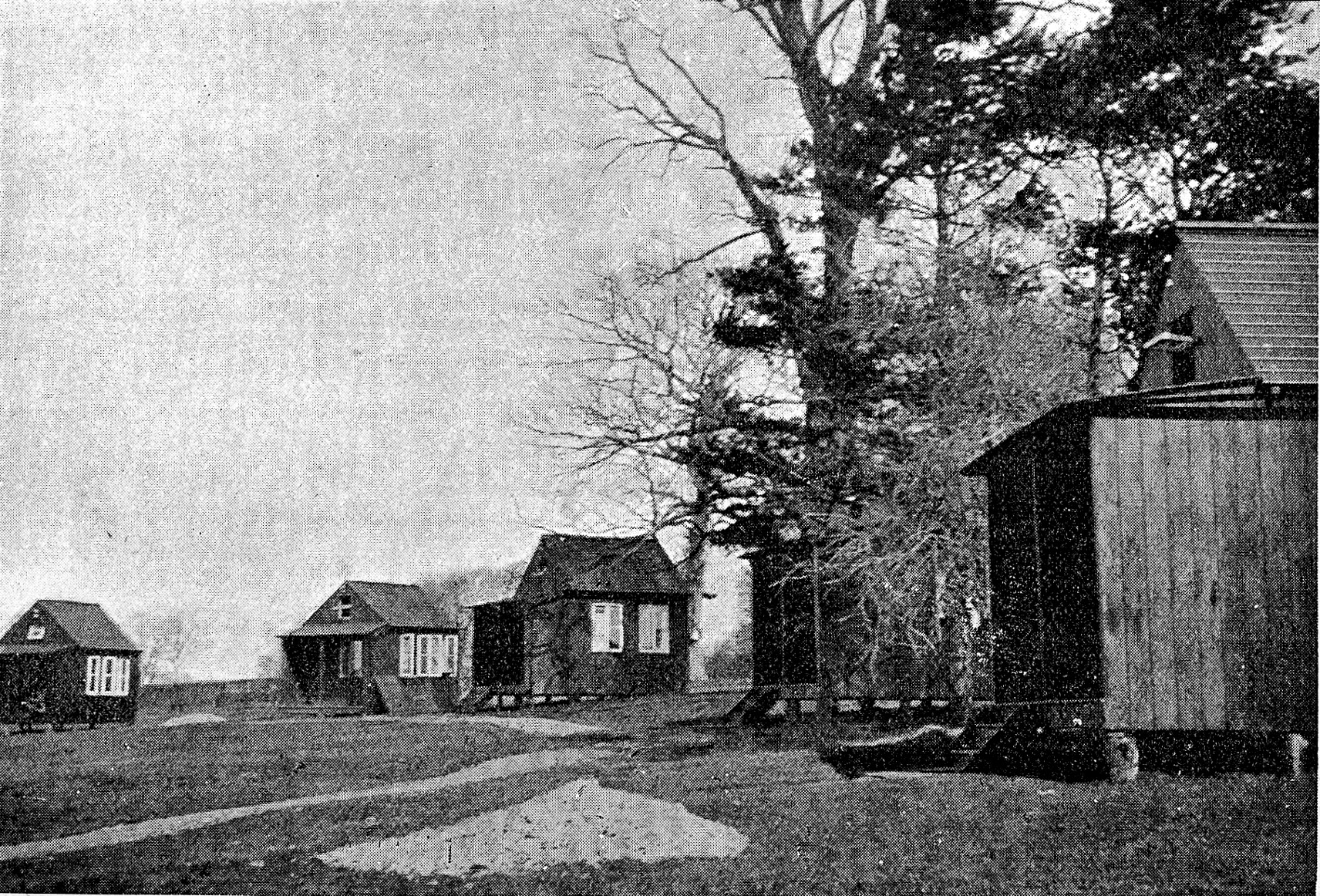

Reinhardt was the first physician to advocate open-air treatment in England. He established the Hailey Open-Air Sanatorium at Ipsden, Wallingford and acted as visiting physician. The sanatorium contained a number of sleeping chalets. He was Honorary Secretary of the Open-Air League and co-authored a handbook on open air treatment. In his book Diet and the Maximum Duration of Life, Reinhardt argued that colon cleansing was responsible for postponing old age. Reinhardt was influenced by the research of Élie Metchnikoff and was one of the earliest physicians to promote the consumption of yoghurt. In his book 120 Years of Life: The Book of the Sour Milk Treatment (1910), he described yogurt as the "deliberate employment of microbes which confer a benefit upon their human host."

He changed his second name to Reinhardt-Rutland in August 1914. He took the name from his great grandmother Jane Rutland (1703–1799).

== Animal welfare ==
Reinhardt was an anti-vivisectionist. He was associated with the National Anti-Vivisection Society. He served as Chairman for the Council of Justice to Animals and was an executive committee member for the Horses and Drivers' Aid Committee. In 1912, Reinhardt attended a meeting at Torre Abbey in which he defended animals as akin to humans because they feel pain and experience suffering. Reinhardt opposed excessive meat eating but promoted dairy products.

== Selected publications ==
- A Handbook of the Open-Air Treatment and Life in an Open-Air Sanatorium (with David Thomson, 1902)
- The Consumptive Poor of England: A Problem and a Solution (1905)
- Notes on the Open-Air Treatment of Consumption (1906)
- 120 years of Life: The Book of the Sour Milk Treatment (1909)
- Elixir Vitæ Nova: A Treatise Upon the Use of Lactic Ferments (1909)
- Diet and the Maximum Duration of Life (1910)
- A Plea for the Humane Slaughter of Animals Used for Food (1911)
- Old Friends in Hard Times: A Little Book for Lovers of Animals (1912)
- The Seventh Son (1912)
- Mental Therapeutics: Or, Faith, Medicine, and the Mind (1914)
