= Electrofishing =

Fishing method utilising electricity

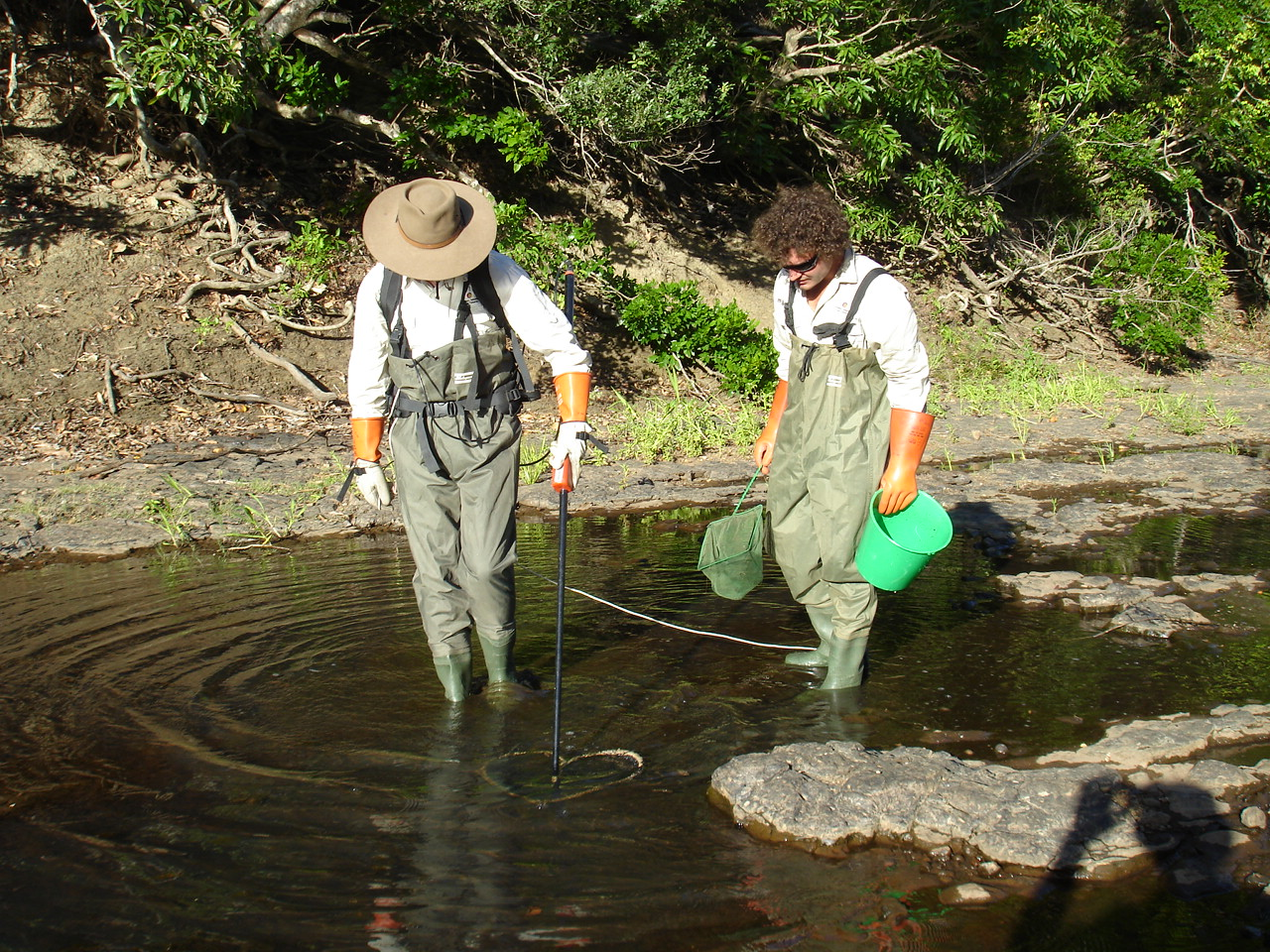
Scientists carrying out a population and species survey using electrofishing equipment

Electrofishing is a fishing technique that uses direct current electricity flowing between a submerged cathode and anode. This affects the movements of nearby fish so that they swim toward the anode, where they can be caught or stunned.

Electrofishing is a common scientific survey method used to sample fish populations to determine abundance, population density and species composition. When performed correctly, electrofishing results in no permanent harm to the fish, which return to their natural mobility state in as little as two minutes after being caught.

== Method ==
Electrofishing relies on two electrodes which deliver direct current at high-voltage from the anode to the cathode through the water. When a fish encounters a large enough potential gradient on this path, it becomes affected by the electricity. Usually pulsed direct current (DC) is applied, which causes galvanotaxis in the fish. Galvanotaxis is uncontrolled muscular convulsion that results in the fish swimming towards the anode. Teams of at least two people are recommended for an effective electrofishing crew: one to operate the anode, and the other to catch the stunned fish with a dip net.

== Types ==
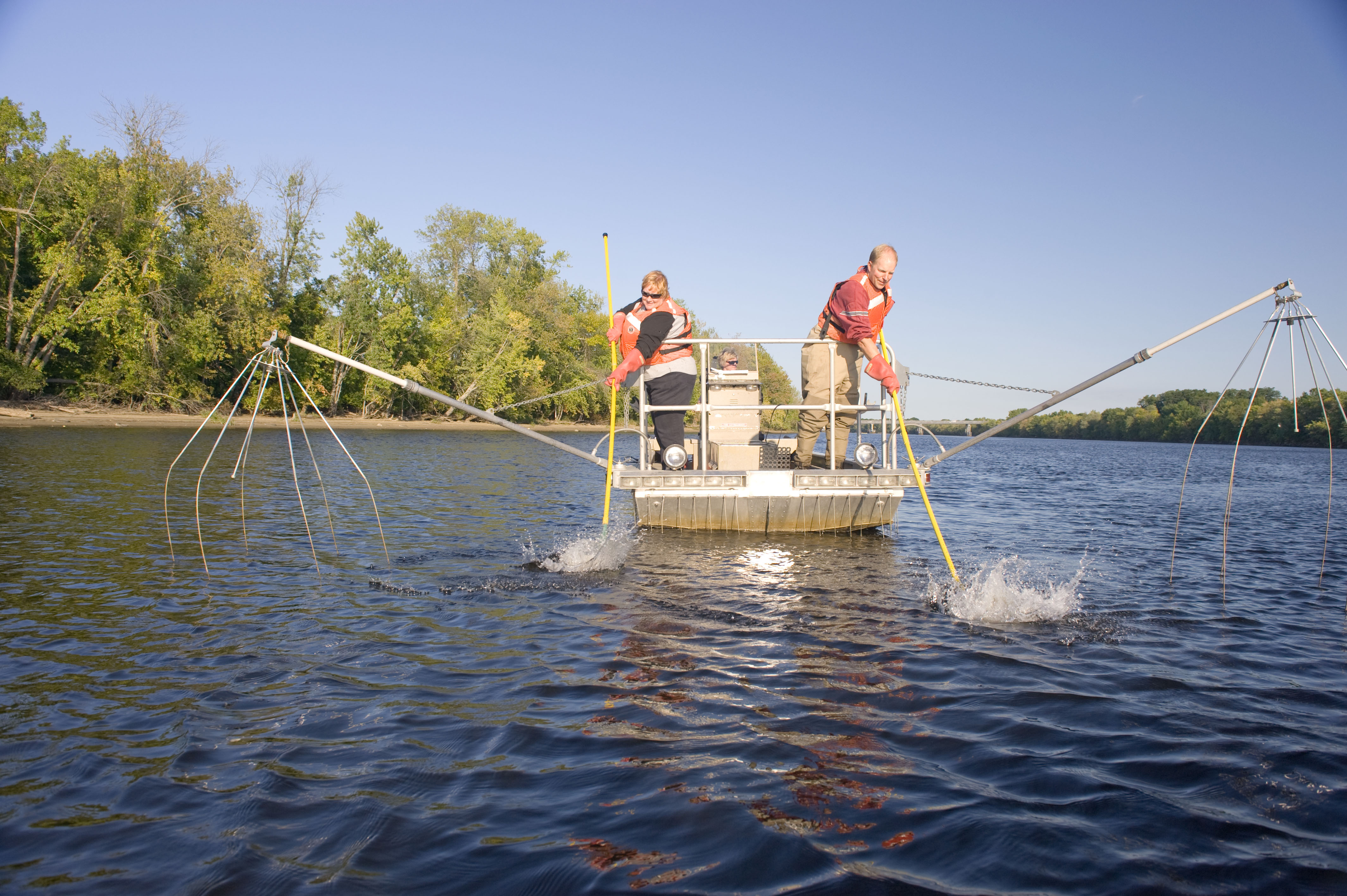
Electrofishing by boat

There are three types of electrofishers: backpack models, tote barge models, and boat mounted models, sometimes called a stunboat.

Backpack electrofisher generators are either battery or gasoline powered. They employ a transformer to pulse the current before it is delivered into the water. The anode is located at the end of a long, two meter pole and is usually in the form of a ring. The cathode is a long, three-meter braided steel cable that trails behind the operator. The electrofisher is operated by a deadman's switch on the anode pole. There are a number of safety features built into newer backpack models, such as audible speakers that sound when the unit is operating, tilt-switches that incapacitate the electrofisher if the backpack is tilted more than 45 degrees, and quick-release straps to enable the user to quickly remove the electrofisher in the event of some emergency.

When boat electrofishing, the boat itself is the cathode, and the anode(s) are generally mounted off the bow. The stunned fish swim toward the anode, where they are caught alive using a dip net. Towed barge electrofishers operate similarly to backpack electrofishers, with the exception that the generator is located on a floating barge instead of on a backpack. Often the barge can be left stationary on the shore, while longer cathodes and anodes allow the crew to sample larger areas. Barge electrofishers often employ gas-powered generators since a user does not have to carry the extra weight on his or her back.

A method of electrofishing using illegally diverted electricity from overhead electric lines is prevalent in parts of the Indian State of Kerala. This can result in accidental deaths due to electrocution.

== Effectiveness ==
The effectiveness of electrofishing is influenced by a variety of biological, technical, logistical, and environmental factors. The catch is often selectively biased as to fish size and species composition. When using pulsed DC for fishing, the pulse rate and the intensity of the electric field strongly influence the size and nature of the catch. The conductivity of the water influences the shape and extent of the electric field and thus affects the field's ability to induce capture-prone behavior in the fish.

When performed incorrectly, electrofishing can injure the fish. The electricity causes muscle spasms that damage the vertebrae. For unknown reasons, this is more common and severe in longer fish. Effects of electrofishing on freshwater fish embryos, specifically those of brook trout, appear to be minimal and do not impact the viability of eggs or sperm.

Due to the conductivity of saltwater, electrofishing is not an effective tool for catching saltwater fish, as the electricity travels through the water, rather than through the fish.

== Legality ==
While electrofishing is used by multiple government agencies, it may be illegal to use it as a form of recreational fishing. This method can be considered poaching. For example, in Florida, as in many other states, it is illegal for recreational use.

The European Union banned pulse trawling in 2006 and again in 2019; the European Court of Justice upheld the ban in 2021 after being challenged by the Dutch government.

== Safety ==
Electrofishing is potentially dangerous, or even lethal. The high voltages and currents used, compounded with the presence of water, present serious safety risks. The typical dangers of electrocution, such as electrically induced unconsciousness and the paralysis of the heart and lungs, are compounded by the risk of drowning, which may result from the aforementioned hazards. In light of this, many safety precautions are taken for those handling electrofishing equipment and those nearby.

== See also ==
- Electric pulse fishing
- Electro-immobilisation
