= Ikejime =

Method of killing fish

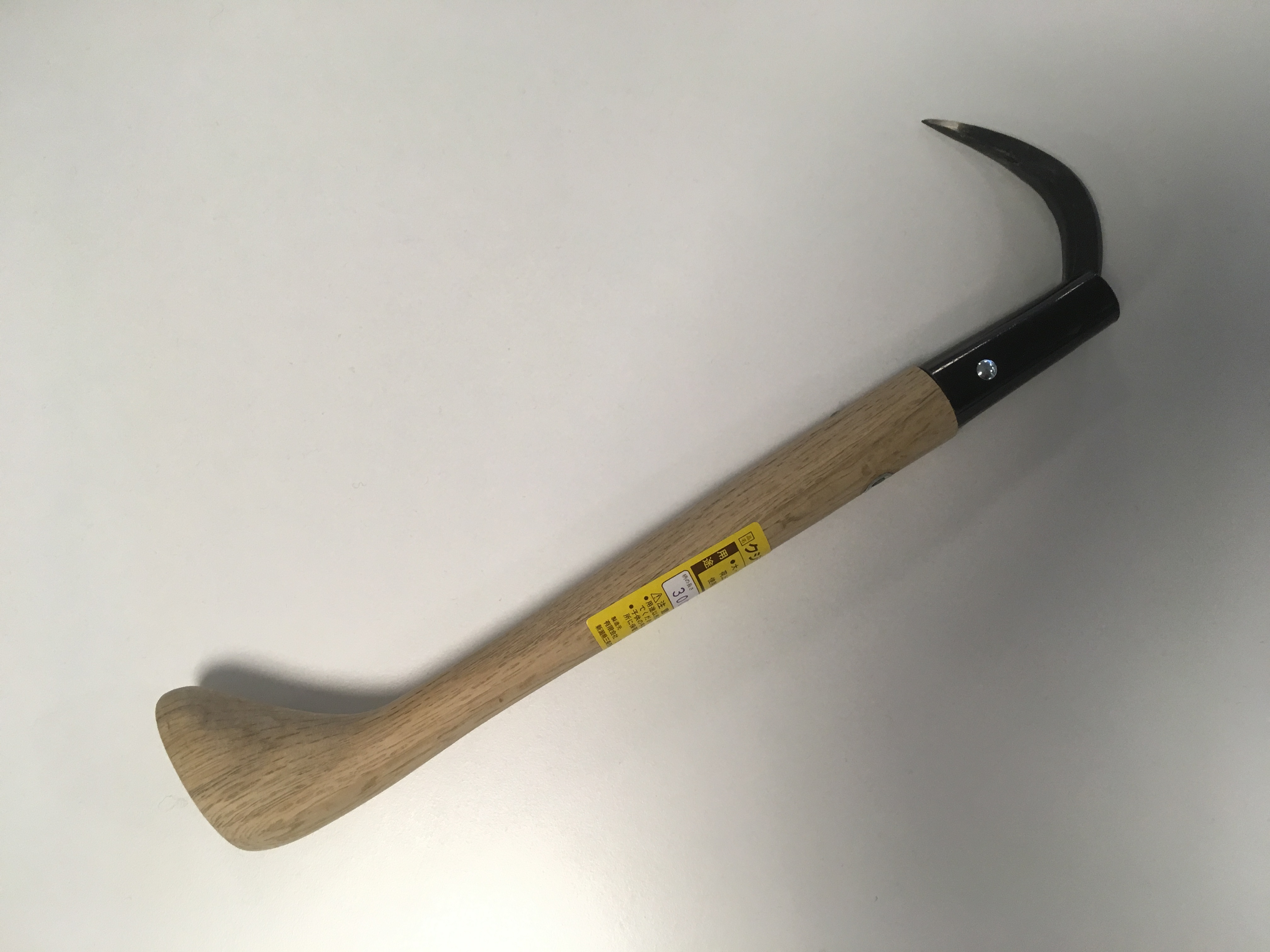
Tekagi (手鉤), the tool that is used for performing ikejime

Ikejime (活け締め) or ikijime (活き締め) is a method of killing fish that maintains the quality of its meat. The technique originated in Japan, but is now in widespread use. It involves the insertion of a spike quickly and directly into the hindbrain, usually located slightly behind and above the eye, thereby causing immediate brain death. After spiking the brain, a thin needle or piece of wire is inserted into the spinal column's neural canal to prevent any further muscle movement. When a fish is spiked correctly, the fins flare and it relaxes, immediately ceasing all motion. Destroying the brain and the spinal cord prevents any reflex action; such muscle movements would otherwise consume adenosine triphosphate (ATP) in the muscle, which would result in the production of lactic acid and ammonia, making the fish sour, soggy, and less tasteful. Further, ikejime causes the blood contained in the flesh of the fish to retract into the gut cavity, producing a better coloured and flavoured fillet, and prolonging shelf life. This method is considered to be the fastest and most humane method of killing fish. Ikejime-killed fish is sought after by restaurants as it also allows the fish to develop more umami when aged.

It is very similar to the technique used on frogs in laboratories called spiking or pithing.

Another technique in APEC Air shipment of live and fresh fish and seafood guidelines is described as follows: "A cut is made toward the front of the flatfish severing the major artery and the spinal cord. Placement of the cut is made to preserve the greatest amount of flatfish flesh. This paralyzes the flatfish. A second cut is made in the tail to hasten the removal of blood. Flatfish are then chilled slowly to maintain circulation and facilitate the bleeding process. After the flatfish have been bled, they are transferred to a salt/ice water slurry and chilled to −12°C."

Ikejime has been successfully used manually in the tuna and yellowtail industries, along with limited use in sport and game fishing, as it provides a rapid slaughter technique. An alternative to death by exsanguination, ikejime is used and the fish put straight into ice or flash-freezing. Robotic machines have been designed to perform the technique.
