= Electro-immobilisation =

Form of restraint used on livestock

Electro-immobilisation is a form of restraint used on livestock as part of animal husbandry. It involves applying an electric current to the animal to interfere with normal nervous activity. The electric current may either be applied via external electrodes, or via an electrode inserted into the anus. The mechanism of immobilisation is by general spastic paralysis resulting from the electric current, and does not have electroanalgesic or anesthesic effects; the animal remains aware while paralysed, and can experience pain.

Numerous researchers have found electro-immobilisation to be highly aversive to animals. Electro-immobilisation is banned in several countries and disapproved of by numerous animal welfare organizations.

== See also ==
- Electrofishing
- Electronarcosis
