= Pithing =

Technique used to immobilize or kill an animal

Pithing /ˈpɪθɪŋ/ is a technique used to immobilize or kill an animal by inserting a needle or metal rod into its brain.

It is regarded as a humane means of immobilizing small animals being observed in experiments, and while once common in commercial slaughtering is no longer practiced in some developed countries on animals intended for the human food supply due to the risks of embedded metal fragments and general spread of disease.

Current United States and European Union regulations prohibit importation of beef from cows pithed due to risk of bovine spongiform encephalopathy (BSE, also known as mad cow disease). It is, however, encouraged for animals in emergency or specific disease control situations where the meat will not be consumed.

== Use ==
=== Commercial slaughter ===
An animal is first immobilized through captive bolt stunning. A pithing cane or rod is then inserted into the stunning hole and pushed to its full length; the rod then remains locked in the hole and is disposed of with the animal. Double pithing destroys the spinal cord, thus killing the animal, and also may reduce the reflex kicking which occurs at stunning, and so contribute to the safety of the slaughterer. This method is also used when dealing with diseased animals in the case of epidemic or notifiable disease.

=== Disease control ===
Pithing is viewed as a humane way of killing an animal that is going to be slaughtered or otherwise killed for disease control or euthanasia reasons, for example an animal which is severely injured in an accident. When animals must be killed on farms for disease control purposes or in an emergency situation, disposable pithing rods allow the slaughterer to adopt best practice. They seal the stunning hole, reducing bleeding, and so provide good biosecurity protection and eliminate the need to bleed out the animal. Disposable devices will help to ensure that the rods do not represent a risk of disease spread, and that they remain with the animal when it is disposed of. In the case of outbreak of notifiable or epidemic disease, government agencies and welfare organisations may develop contingency plans. "Planned stocking" may be necessary to ensure that rods are available at short notice in the event of a disease outbreak.

=== In science ===
Pithing is also a procedure used in laboratories to immobilize a biological specimen, for instance a frog. A needle is inserted through the rear base of the skull and wiggled, destroying the brain. The specimen remains living due to vital functions continuing without cerebral control, allowing it to be dissected while observing such living physiology as its beating heart and expansion and contraction of its lungs without causing further pain.

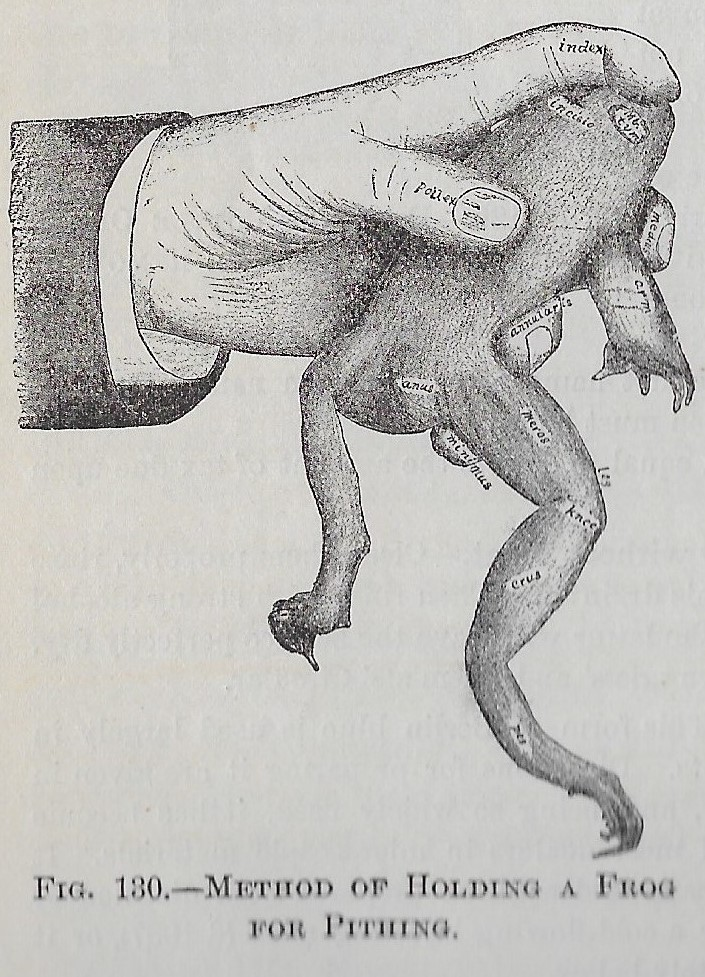
Method of pithing a frog from Anatomical Technology as Applied to the Domestic Cat: An Introduction to Human, Veterinary, and Comparative Anatomy Book by Burt Green Wilder and Simon Henry Gage (1882)

== See also ==
- Ikejime
