= Humane Slaughter Association =

British organisation

- Abbreviation: HSA
- Founded: 1911
- Type: Charitable incorporated organisation
- Registration no.: 1159690
- Purpose: Humane livestock slaughter
- Location: The Old School, Brewhouse Hill, Wheathampstead, Hertfordshire, AL4 8AN, United Kingdom
- Region served: United Kingdom and worldwide
- Method: Research and training
- Key people: Robert C. Hubrecht (Chief Executive & Scientific Director)
- Revenue: £316,723 (2012–13)
- Disbursements: £269,409 (2012–13)
- Endowment: £3,910,078 (2012–13)
- Employees: 9
- Website: www.hsa.org.uk

The Humane Slaughter Association (HSA) supports research, training, and development to improve the welfare of livestock during transport and slaughter. It provides technical information about handling and slaughter on its website, training for farmer staff and vets, advice to governments and industry, and funding of science and technology to make slaughter more humane. HSA is the sister charity to Universities Federation for Animal Welfare.

== History ==
The Council of Justice to Animals (CJA) was founded at a meeting held on 17 January 1911 to improve humane methods for the slaughter of livestock and address the killing of unwanted pets. The original founders were Netta Ivory, and Nancy Price. The CJA advocated for livestock to be shot in the head with the RSPCA Humane Killer and other bolt pistols rather than a poleaxe which they described as a "cruel weapon".

The Duchess of Portland was elected President, physician Charles Reinhardt was Chairman and Robert Stewart was secretary. Their office was located on Old Burlington Street. Novelist Thomas Hardy was a member of the committee. The CJA worked with the Humane Slaughter of Animals Association which was co-founded by Norman Child Graham in 1920. Violet Wood was appointed secretary of the Council of Justice for Animals in 1920. Wood visited slaughterhouses to kill bulls with a pistol to demonstrate it was more humane than using a poleaxe. By 1927 she was credited with introducing the "humane killing of animals for food into nearly every capital of Europe, and from statistics she calculates that in Rome alone, as a result of her demonstrations there, 120,000 animals annually are killed humanely".

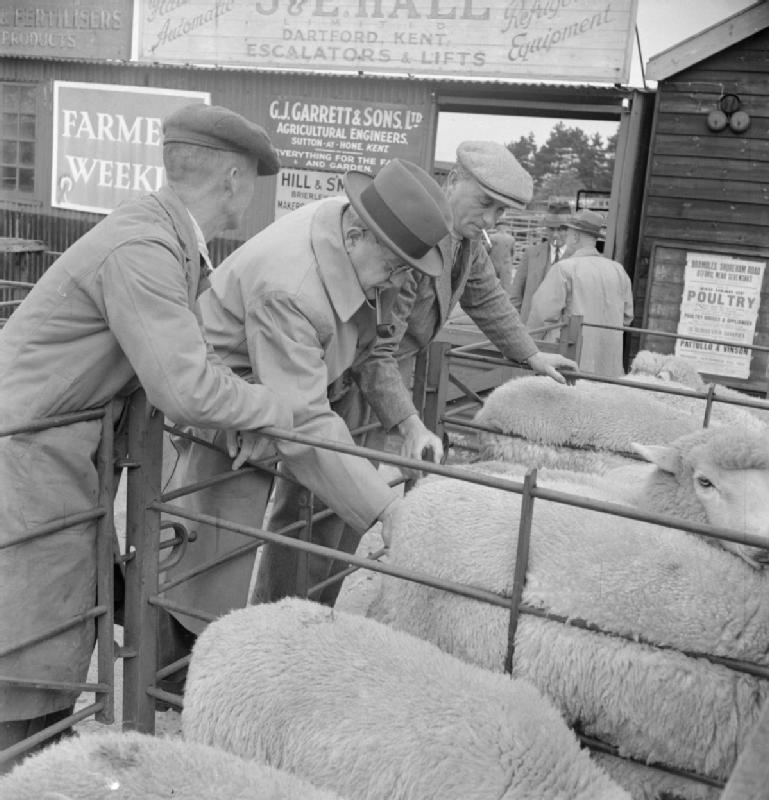
Sheep at Maidstone cattle market, Kent, England, UK, 1944

In 1928, the organisations amalgamated as the Council of Justice for Animals and the Humane Slaughter Association, which is most often called "the HSA"; on 1 April 2016, the Humane Slaughter Association became a charitable incorporated organisation and the Council of Justice for Animals was dropped from the name. In the early 1920s, HSA introduced and demonstrated a mechanical stunner, which led to the adoption of humane stunning "by 28 London boroughs and later by 494 other local authorities." HSA helped improve water, shelter, and handling conditions at animal markets. It lobbied for transporting cattle by train instead of on foot, and in 1941, rail lines were built to a major slaughterhouse for this reason. HSA played a key role in passage of

- UK's Slaughter of Animals Act 1933, requiring mechanical stunning of cows and electrical stunning of pigs. The law excluded pig facilities without electricity, sheep, and Jewish/Muslim meat.
- UK's Slaughter of Animals (Pigs) Act 1954, which required mechanical stunning of pigs outside slaughterhouses.
- Canada's 1960 humane-slaughter regulations, partially inspired by HSA's captive-bolt demonstrations in 1950.
- UK's ban on live exports for slaughter in the early 1970s (reversed in 1975).

HSA was asked for its views on the UK Slaughterhouses Act 1958 and the Prevention of Cruelty and Hygiene Regulations. HSA was mentioned in the House of Lords debates over UK's Slaughter of Poultry Act 1967.

== Research support ==
=== Humane Slaughter Award ===
HSA aims to encourage research and development of more humane livestock-slaughter methods with its Humane Slaughter Award, which recognizes "individuals or organisations, based anywhere in the world, whose work has resulted in significant advances in the humane slaughter of farmed livestock."

Winners of HSA's Humane Slaughter Award
Year	Winner	Reason	Recognition
2009	Prof. Craig Johnson and his colleagues at Massey University, New Zealand.	Research showing that calves feel pain when slaughtered without stunning.	HSA's award was recognized by articles in New Scientist and The Week, as well as an editorial in The Guardian, suggesting that religious slaughter, including shechita and dhabīḥah, is not humane.
2011	Jeff Lines of Silsoe Livestock Systems and John Ace-Hopkins of Ace Aquatec Limited.	Research and commercialization of electrical stunning of farmed fish.	The award was recognized by Farming Monthly National and The Fish Site.
2012	Stunning and Slaughter Group at the University of Bristol's School of Veterinary Sciences.	Research into several topics in the field of humane slaughter, including controlled atmosphere killing for poultry and improving electrical stunning; training programs; input to scientific reviews that shape legislation.	The award was recognized by the University of Bristol, Veterinary Record, The Poultry Site, WATT Global Media, Meat Trades Journal Online, and Farmers Weekly.
2013	IRTA/UAB Animal Welfare Research Group, Institut de Recerca i Tecnologia Agroalimentàries (IRTA) / Universitat Autònoma de Barcelona (UAB).	Research on topics like more humane gas stunning of pigs, sheep, poultry, and rabbits; training programs; providing input to government policy.	

=== Scholarships ===
HSA has given a total of 48 Dorothy Sidley Scholarships of £2,000 each "to enable students or trainees in the industry to carry out a project which is clearly aimed at improving the welfare of food animals in markets, during transport or at slaughter." Research supported has included the welfare of sheep while transported at sea, handling methods for poultry, rejection of carcases in religious slaughter, and captive-bolt stunning of alpacas. In 2011, HSA gave a Research Training Scholarship for PhD research to Jessica Hopkins of the Scottish Agricultural College for exploration of humane mechanical methods to kill sick or injured chickens in emergency situations on farms, as an improvement over cervical dislocation, which is thought to not be completely humane. The research has been presented at several conferences.

=== Grants ===
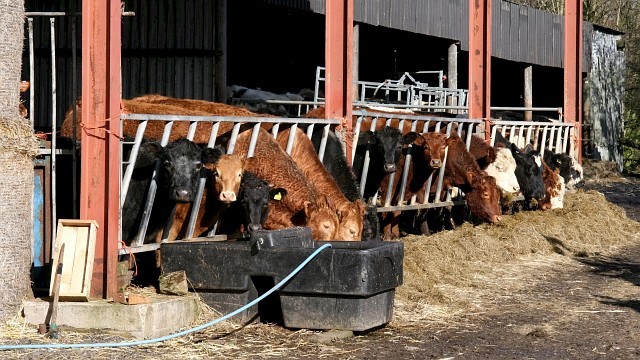
Cattle barn at Timber Lane Farm, Holmewood, England

HSA offers grants "for essential research and other projects aimed at improving animal welfare during transport, in markets and at slaughter." Past grants have addressed livestock transport vehicle emergencies, monitoring atmosphere stunning of poultry, and electrical stunning on sea bass.

=== Conferences ===
A 2004 HSA workshop in Lochearnhead, Scotland, demonstrated an electric stunner for farmed trout. Electric stunning of farmed fish has since been widely adopted at least in the UK. In 2011, to celebrate its centennial year, HSA organized the symposium "Recent Advances in the Welfare of Livestock at Slaughter", which was attended by 250 people from around the world. The event featured over a dozen presentations, including one by Temple Grandin.

In 2013, HSA convened a workshop on Low Atmospheric Pressure Stunning (LAPS), a proposal to kill chickens by withdrawing air from a chamber over the course of 5 minutes. The lack of oxygen induces unconsciousness without a rise in heart rate and with brain activity that resembles a sleep-like state before death.

== Training and advice ==
HSA offers training courses to farmers (large-scale, small-scale, and hobbyist), slaughter workers, and students. For example, here is a subset of the trainings HSA conducted during 2009-2010:

- teaching a major UK duck farmer and processor about humane on-farm killing of sick and injured birds
- training a poultry processor in Thailand, a UK turkey processor, two retail sites for red-meat processing, and a pig processor
- training a salmon producer in Norway and rainbow-trout farmers in central Scotland
- five smallholder poultry-welfare courses and six courses on captive-bolt stunning for pigs.

HSA educational materials have won International Visual Communications Awards in 1995 and 2000 and the Meat Industry Awards Training Initiative of the Year, Poultry Welfare in 2006. HSA also provides advice to meat producers, governments, and academics. At the request of a producer or retailer, it performs inspections of slaughterhouses and livestock markets to assess animal welfare and suggest improvements.

== See also ==
- Animal slaughter
- Fish welfare at slaughter
- Inert gas asphyxiation
- Temple Grandin
