= Electric pulse fishing =

Fishing technique

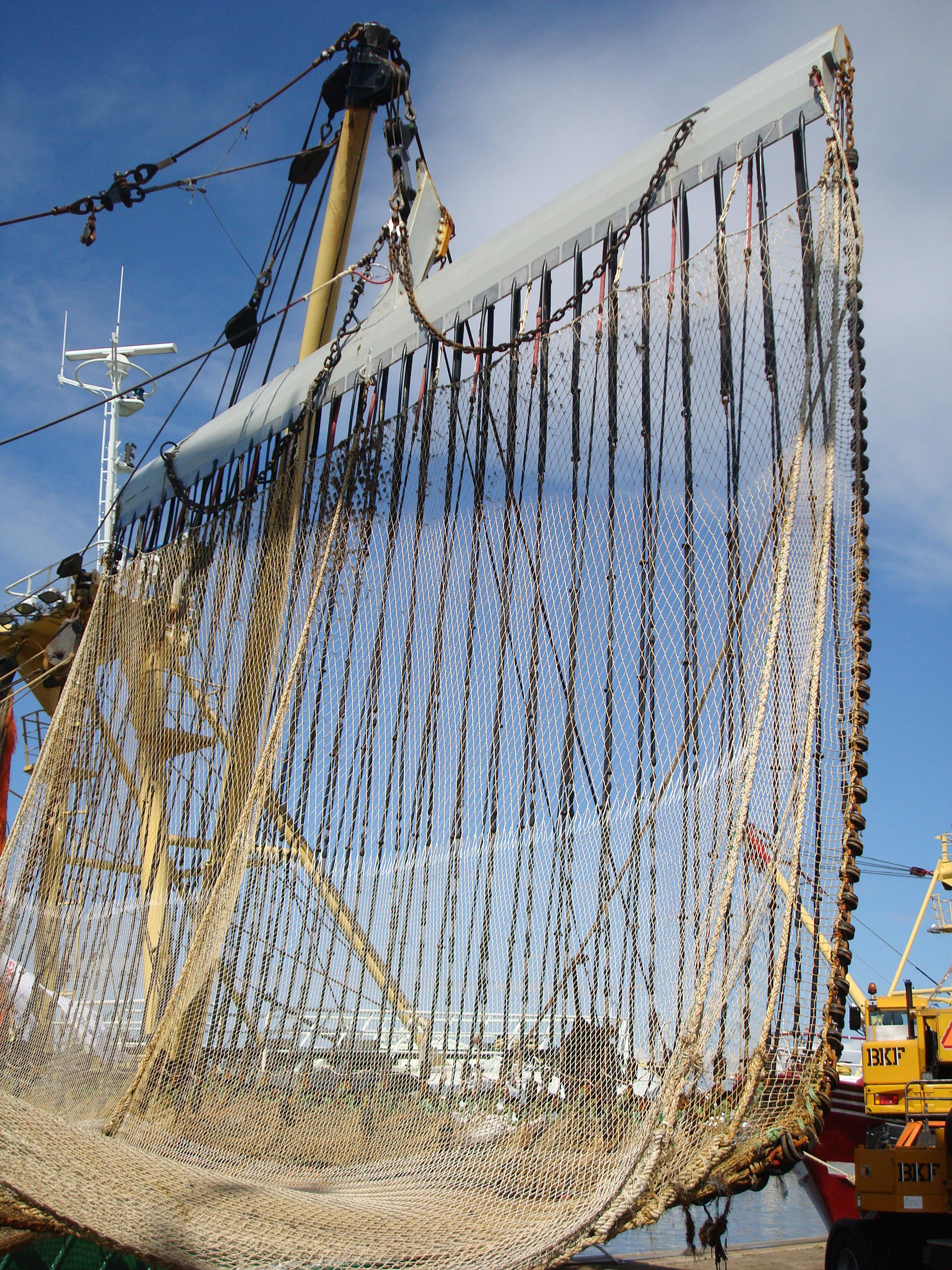
The pulse trawl: electrodes in the tow direction of the gear cause an electric field above the seabed, which stimulate the flatfish so they come up toward the net

Electric pulse fishing is a fishing technique sometimes used in trawl fisheries which produces a limited electric field above the seabed to catch fish. The pulse trawl gear consists of a number of electrodes, attached to the gear in the tow direction, that emit short electric pulses. The electrodes replace the tickler chains that are used in traditional beam trawl fishery. The pulse trawl fishery is mainly aimed at flatfish like sole, with by-catch plaice. In addition, the pulse trawl gear is applied in shrimp fisheries on a limited scale. Technically, the use of electricity to catch fish is prohibited in European waters. However, the European Union is able to provide exemptions to this rule since 2007. These exemptions are now mainly used by Dutch and British trawlers in the North Sea.

Electric pulse fishing should not be confused with pulse fishing, which is a fisheries management technique for preventing fish stocks from being overfished by periodically permitting a cycle of fishing followed by a fallow period which allows stocks to reconstitute.

== Background ==
Electric pulse fishing is applied on a limited scale for catching flatfish. In this branch of demersal fishery different techniques can be used for disturbing fish on the seabed and sending them up into the belly of the net. In conventional bottom trawling the trawl doors and foot rope, which consists of steel chains mounted to the bottom of the net opening, disturb the seabed, causing the demersal fish to swim along in the mouth of the net until they succumb and fall into cod end. Electric pulse fishing gear does not involve these chains, but features cables with electrodes consisting of isolated and conductive elements mounted in the dragging direction. A short-lasting electric field is generated to disturb demersal fish without killing or paralysing them, but rather by causing an involuntary muscular contraction.

Electric pulse fishing consumes less energy compared to conventional trawling, due to the lighter trawl, lower fishing speed and lower frictive resistance from the seabed. It therefore requires significantly less fuel, which reduces carbon dioxide emissions and makes it an economically interesting alternative. As there is no "ploughing effect", this method of fishing has a less disastrous impact on the seabed ecosystem. It also involves fewer discards for all species categories that are discarded.

== Bans ==
In January 2018, the European Parliament approved a call to ban electric pulse fishing, seen by some as cruel.

France banned electric pulse fishing on 14 August 2019.

The UK banned the practice of Electric Pulse fishing on 1st January 2021 as one of the first actions after Brexit, where independence from the EU was required to ban it in the UK's Exclusive Economic Zone, though not its Territorial Waters.

== See also ==
- Electrofishing
