= Louise G. Rabinovitch =

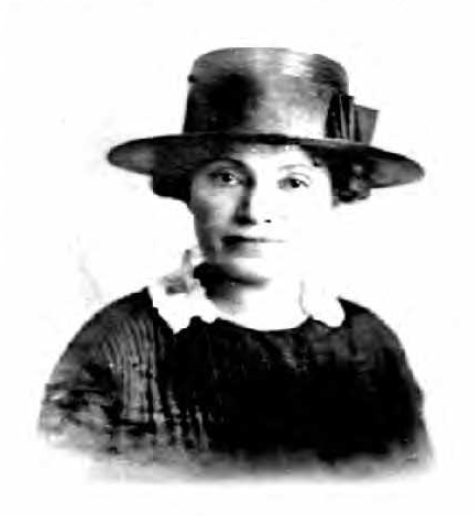
- Born: December 29, 1869; Mohyliv-Podilskyi, Russia
- Died: June, 1954; Denver, Colorado
- Education: Woman's Medical College of Pennsylvania
- Occupations: Physician, medical researcher
- Years active: 1894-1920

Louise G. Rabinovitch (1869-20th-century) was an early 20th-century psychologist and advocate for improved treatment in New York City mental asylums.

== Birth and citizenship ==
Rabinovitch was born on December 29, 1869, in Mohyliv-Podilskyi in the Russian Empire. In 1895 she applied to become a US citizen.

She reportedly had two brothers who had adopted the surname Robin: Joseph G. Robin and Edward Robin. Joseph, a banker, was convicted of embezzlement in a New York City scandal that also involved Rabinovitch. She was indicted on a charge of perjury on June 10, 1911. Rabinovitch swore her only known relatives were Joseph and Edward, denying her parents lived in the United States. However, an elderly man and woman claimed their parentage and testified in front of a jury. When the couple attempted to embrace the Rabinovitchs, the siblings denied they were their parents.

Joseph G. Robin was pardoned by the State of New York in 1915 and the charges against Rabinovitch were dropped.

== Education ==
Rabinovitch had lived in Germany and France before immigrating to the United States in April 1887. Two years later it was reported that she was one of 36 graduates from Woman's Medical College of Pennsylvania. On her writing she used the credentials "B es L., MD Paris, member, New York Academy of Medicine, member, American Medical Association, for an associate member, medical psychological Society, Paris"

== Work in psychology ==
In 1894 Dr. Rabinovitch testified before the New York State Lunacy Commissioners who were investigating abuses in New York city asylums. She had worked as an intern at the Hospital For The Insane at Ward's Island. Her testimony highlighted that there was a lack of attendants in the asylum on Ward's Island and that the chief restraints were "enormous doses of chloral and morphine". There were only two trained nurses at the institution. The article revealed Rabinovitch was an advocate for better treatment for the mentally ill: "(the asylum offered) absolutely no treatment for the mental condition of the insane. Gynecology was not practiced in the female Asylum". Her testimony impacted the commissioners:

When she had concluded the autocratic Department of Charities and Correction and the medical gentlemen of Ward's Island were dazed and panicky. President Porter, who the day before had attempted to snap his fingers at the crusade as he had done in the grand jury room and said he would not answer the testimony had changed his attitude and had been to Mayor Gilroy pleading for an assistant corporation counsel to defend the asylum. Dr. Rabinovitch, wearied with her examination, was turned over to the asylum apologists for cross-examination. They were not ready. So the Commissioners adjourned until June 14 to give the department time to see if one little woman has damaged its insane asylum record beyond repair"

She read a paper in front of the International Psychological Congress in Rome. She "delivered a lecture on electric sleep making experiments on a rabbit. She endeavored to prove that sleep obtained by this means is natural and not epileptic."

In 1907 Rabinovitch read a paper in front of the International Congress on Psychiatry in Amsterdam spurring the headline "The First Born Not Necessarily the Most Brilliant." The paper dispelled the belief that birth order influenced intelligence.

== Electricity experiments ==
The focus of Rabinovitch's medical research was the use of electricity as an anesthetic, termed "electrical anesthesia". A cable from Paris was reported in 1908, "The Paris authorities which will permit her to apply the system on a large scale in local insane asylums... Luis Parisot, a prominent scientist said Miss Rabinovitch's discovery is destined to exert a profound influence in the practice of both surgery and medicine."

In 1909 "Before 150 members of the American Electro-Therapeutic Association in New York. Dr. Rabinovitch electrocuted a rabbit. When it was pronounced dead, she restored it to normal life. In Paris a woman pronounced dead from an overdose of morphine was restored a year ago, and is still living."

By 1910 her electrical experiments had progressed to human subjects. A newspaper headline proclaimed, "Device of woman doctor relieves man from pain while his toes are amputated at Hartford Hospital. Patient laughs during ordeal and does not feel knife." The operation was performed at St. Francis Hospital in Hartford, CT to remove four frozen toes. The surgery was described:

When the man have been made ready for the operation straps were fastened about his legs at points designated by Dr Rabinovitch. On these straps were electrodes to which were attached wires connecting with a battery. The electricity was turned on, and it numbed the legs below the knees much as cocaine would. The patient was blindfolded and the surgeons went to work. The toes were amputated and the patient soon was released from the electrical attachments."

== Writing ==
Rabinovitch edited the Journal of Mental Pathology which also published articles authored by her.

In 1901 she wrote an article on what we would term today Fetal Alcohol Spectrum Disorder:

Alcoholism of the parents is the major cause responsible for the birth of idiot and imbecile children. Alcoholism not only causes idiocy and imbecility of The offspring, but also acts as a strong factor in reducing birth rate and increasing death rate. Children of alcoholic parents, if not idiots and imbeciles, are apt to be invalid in many other ways and are prone to die in infancy of meningitis.

== Later work ==
In 1937, Rabinovitch was involved in a lawsuit to gain a patent on Woolf's Hypozone, a chemical antiseptic. It was determined she did not have a right to the patent.

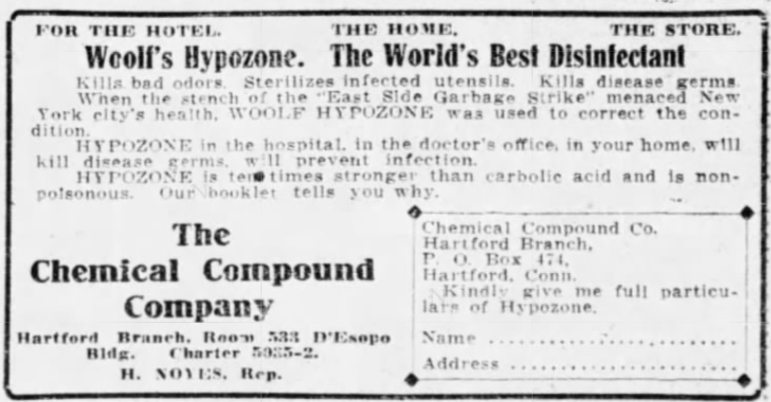
1918 Ad for Woolf's Hypozone
