= Captive bolt pistol =

Device used for stunning animals before slaughter

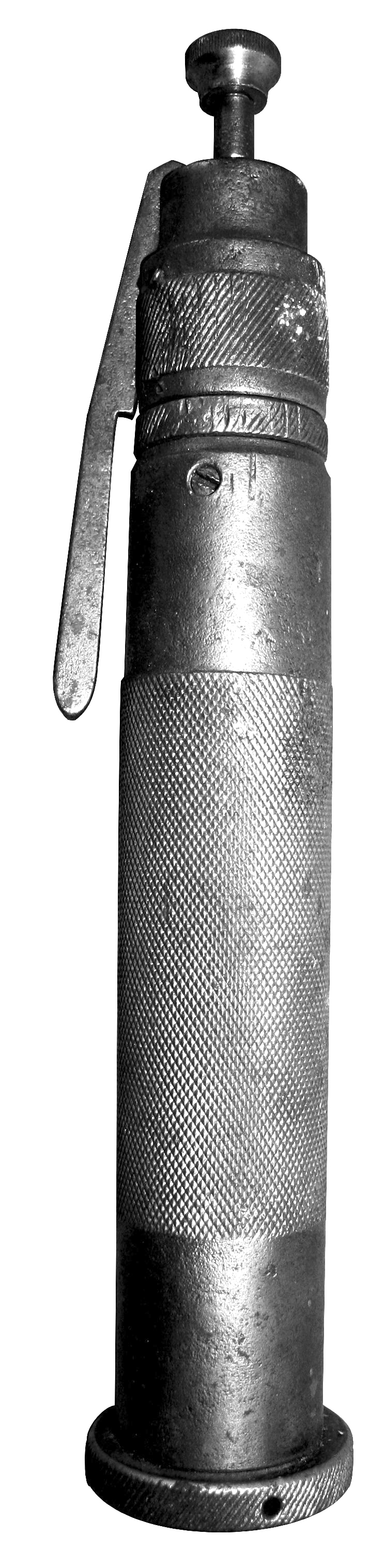
A captive bolt pistol

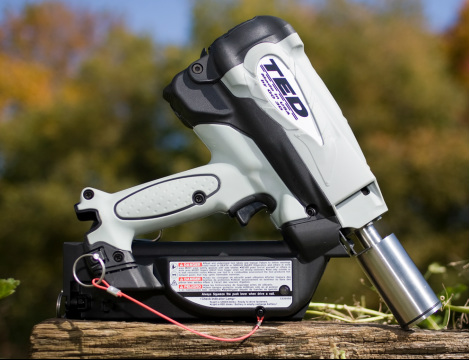
A modern captive bolt device

A captive bolt pistol (also known as a captive bolt gun, a cattle gun, a stunbolt gun, a bolt gun, a stun gun and a stunner) is a device designed for stunning animals prior to slaughter.

A captive bolt pistol is intended to deliver a single, powerful strike to the forehead of an animal in order to quickly induce unconsciousness by either inducing a concussion or directly destroying brain tissue. Depending on the variation and usage, the bolt may or may not penetrate the skull and cause direct damage to the brain.

The bolt consists of a heavy rod or piston, typically made of a corrosion-resistant material such as stainless steel. The bolt is actuated by a trigger pull and is propelled forward by either compressed air, a spring mechanism, or by the discharge of a blank round. After moving a short distance, spring tension causes the bolt to recoil back into the barrel.

The captive bolt pistol was invented in 1903 by Hugo Heiss, the former director of a slaughterhouse in Straubing, Germany.

== Variations ==
Captive bolt pistols are of three types: penetrating, non-penetrating, and free bolt. The use of penetrating captive bolts has largely been discontinued in commercial situations in order to minimize the risk of transmission of disease.

In the penetrating variation, the bolt penetrates the skull of the animal and catastrophically damages the cerebrum and part of the cerebellum. Concussion causes destruction of vital centers of the brain and an increase in intracranial pressure, causing the animal to lose consciousness. This method is considered the most effective type of stunning. It ensures a high probability of a successful stun by physically destroying brain matter but does not damage the brain stem; as a result, the heart continues to pump after the animal is incapacitated, which aids in the exsanguination process. One disadvantage of this method is that brain matter is allowed to enter the blood stream, possibly contaminating other tissue with bovine spongiform encephalopathy (BSE, colloquially known as mad cow disease).

The action of a non-penetrating stunner is similar, but the bolt is blunt with a mushroom-shaped tip. The bolt strikes the forehead with great force and immediately retracts. The subsequent concussion is responsible for the unconsciousness of the animal. This type of stunner is less reliable at causing immediate unconsciousness than penetrating types; however, it has undergone a resurgence of popularity because of concerns about mad cow disease. In the European Union, this captive bolt design is required for slaughter of animals that will be used for pharmaceutical manufacture.

The free bolt stunner is used for emergency, in-the-field euthanasia of large animals that cannot be restrained. It differs from a true captive bolt gun in that the projectile is not retractable; it is similar in operation to a powder-actuated nail gun or a conventional firearm. Capable of firing only when pressed firmly against a surface (typically the animal's forehead), the device fires a small projectile through the animal's skull. The veterinarian can then either leave the animal to die from the projectile wound or administer lethal drugs.

== Use ==
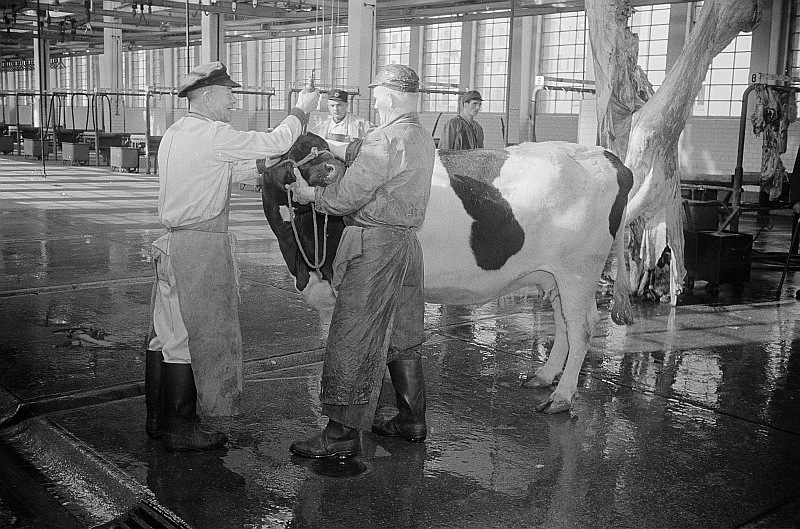
A captive bolt pistol in use on a cow

With cattle, goats, sheep, rabbits, and horses, failure to adequately stun using a penetrating stunner can largely be attributed to incorrect positioning. In commercial operations, rates of failure can be significant and multiple shots are often used. One study looking at cattle found that 12% were shot multiple times, and 12.5% were inadequately stunned. Other research has recorded higher error rates, such as a study looking at young kangaroos which found that 38% of attempts failed to adequately stun the animal.

Captive bolts allow for meat trimmings from the head to be salvaged. In some veal operations, a non-penetrating concussive stunner is used in order to preserve the brain of the animal for further processing. Captive bolt stunners are safer to use for operators in most red meat slaughter processes. There is no danger of ricochet or overpenetration as there is with regular firearms.

The cartridges typically use 2 to 3 grains (130 to 190 mg) of smokeless powder but can use up to 7 grains (450 mg) in the case of large animals, such as bulls. The velocity of the bolt is usually 55 metres per second (180 ft/s) in the case of small animals and 75 metres per second (250 ft/s) in the case of large animals.

== Use for homicide ==
There have been a number of cases where a captive bolt pistol has been used for homicide, including:

- In 1966, in murder of 17-year-old Anna Neumayer, for which Josef Fritzl is among the suspects.
- In 1991, a 46-year-old German man with a history of alcohol abuse and aggressive behaviour killed his wife.
- In 2009, a 40-year-old English slaughterhouse worker killed a woman with two shots to the chest.

=== Suicide ===
In medical literature, at least one case report of suicide by captive bolt pistol has been published. The report states this method of suicide is not uncommon in central European countries with less strict laws surrounding the possession and use of such tools.

== In popular culture ==
A bolt gun is central to the 1986 Dick Francis novel, Bolt.

In the 2007 film No Country for Old Men, the villain Anton Chigurh (played by Javier Bardem) uses a captive bolt pistol as a signature, silent weapon.

== See also ==
- Electrical water bath stunning
- Thumping
