= Thumping =

Killing of farm animals via blunt force

Thumping of a piglet considered a runt at a farm in Victoria, Australia

Thumping is a method of killing farm animals via blunt force trauma. It is usually done by either striking them on the head or striking their body against a flat surface. It can be followed by exsanguination (meaning to make them quickly bleed out). It is often used in pig farms on piglets who are considered of low economic value and/or injured or sick. It is also widely used in other industries such as rabbit farming, dairy farming (primarily on male calves), or on laboratory rats. It is a very controversial method.

== Controversy ==
The method has been called unreliable, inhumane, and needless harm by government advisory groups in the UK and EU, animal rights groups, and animal welfare groups. Some pig farm operators have called the method aesthetically unappealing, and researchers have noted it poses risks to worker safety. Researchers have also noted that unsuccessful attempts cause piglets to experience pain, dizziness, nausea, being out of breath, and panic. Failure rates vary with worker exhaustion being a large factor. Some studies found upwards of 22% failure. Others studies that did not include worker fatigue did not detect failure.

The method is especially criticized when used on calves. Their thicker skulls prevent brain tissue from being destroyed as quickly. This entails worse consistency and higher difficulty in using the method. This is said to result in longer periods of consciousness and increased suffering. Additionally, concerns have been raised on how male calves themselves are usually healthy and killed only for not being of economic value to the industry.

The American Veterinary Medical Association considers thumping an acceptable method for piglets, poultry, and fish but not for calves, lambs or goats. However, they discourage its use overall due to the mental trauma it gives workers, worker fatigue decreasing efficacy, decrease in ability to detect brain diseases postmortem, and concerns about if the practice is humane.

The World Organisation for Animal Health has not listed the method as acceptable as of 2011.

Those who use thumping primarily cite its low cost and low need for investment into it compared to other killing and stunning methods. Many farm operators that use it express discomfort with it. Depression and remorse are the most common emotions reported from those involved in the process.

== Global use ==
=== Partial bans ===
The method was banned for piglets in the UK in 2022, however investigations have found it taking place in violation of the law. It is permitted for the stunning of laboratory rats after an experiment is completed. The method has also been banned for piglets within the EU. It is allowed in the European Union for smaller animals.

=== Permitted use ===
==== Brazil ====
In Brazil, 90% of pig farms reported using pig thumping primarily due to its low cost. 96% of pig farm operators (using any method to kill piglets) reported to feel uncomfortable with the method they used.

==== New Zealand ====
In New Zealand, thumping is considered an approved method of killing.

==== Canada ====
In Canada, it is the most common way to kill rabbits raised for meat, and it is considered an approved and used method for killing piglets. 34% of Canadian dairy farms report using thumping on male calves. One study found smaller dairy farms had higher rates of thumping usage as well as the practice being more common in Quebec.

==== United States ====
In the United States, a 2004 survey found that 93% of pig farms used thumping on pigs between 1-12 lbs and 50% used it on nursery pigs. There are no restrictions on the methods used to kill calves in the dairy industry. Thumping has also been considered an acceptable method for fish slaughter in the US. The majority of US sturgeon farms in the US use thumping followed by exsanguination.

==== Australia ====
In Australia, thumping is an approved method and is how most piglets are killed. 25% of Australian dairy farms reported using thumping as a means to kill calves.

== See also ==
- Cow-calf separation
- Electrical water bath stunning
- Foam depopulation
- Ventilation shutdown
