= Exsanguination =

Loss of blood, possibly causing death

Exsanguination, simply known as bleeding out, is the loss of blood from the circulatory system of a vertebrate, usually leading to death. The word comes from the Latin 'sanguis', meaning blood, and the prefix 'ex-', meaning 'out of'.

Exsanguination has long been used as a method of animal slaughter.

In the past, bloodletting was a common medical procedure or therapy, but it is now rarely used in medicine.

Depending upon the health of the individual, a person usually dies from losing half to two-thirds of their blood; a loss of roughly one-third of the blood volume is considered a critical condition. Even a single deep cut can warrant suturing and hospitalization, especially if trauma, a vein or artery, or another comorbidity is involved.

== Slaughtering of animals ==
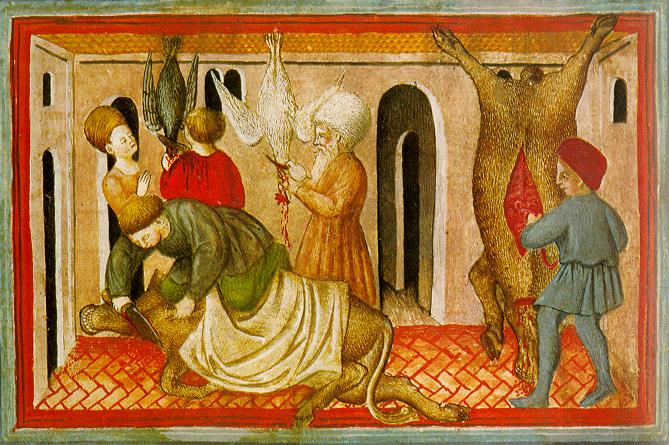
15th-century depiction of exsanguination as part of Jewish ritual slaughter of animals for consumption

Exsanguination is used as a slaughter method. Before the fatal incision is made, the animal is claimed to be rendered insensible to pain by various methods, including captive bolt, electricity, or chemical. Electricity is used mostly to incapacitate swine, poultry, and domestic sheep, whereas a chemical is used for injured livestock. In commercial operations, rates of failure can be significant and multiple shots are often used. One study looking at captive bolts use in cattle found that 12% were shot multiple times, and 12.5% were inadequately stunned.

Without prior sedation, stunning, or anesthetic, this method of slaughter may cause a high degree of anxiety, depending on the process. Research has indicated that how animals are handled and restrained before slaughter likely impacts their welfare more than whether or not they are stunned. Some argue that if done badly, there can be a large element of cruelty involved, whereas others argue that killing under the correct conditions minimizes the pain or suffering inflicted upon the animal.

Continued pumping operation of the heart during exsanguination increases the rate of depletion and thus hastens death by raising the fluid pressure of the blood. Because the heart operates like a positive displacement pump, blood volume reduction will not affect cardiac output efficiency. Deprivation of blood to the heart does gradually result in diminished function, but concurrently with similar death of other parts in the body as blood volume declines.

In preparation for slaughter, an animal is hung head down by its hind legs. Quickly after the animal is incapacitated, a very sharp knife is inserted parallel to the ground through the skin just in front of the point of the jaw and below the vertebrae. From this position, the knife is drawn forward away from the spine to sever the jugular veins, carotid arteries, and trachea. Properly performed, blood will flow freely, and death will occur within seconds. Sheep and duck will reach heart and liver malfunction, leading to death, in under 10 seconds; larger animals, notably cattle, may take up to 40 seconds to reach brain death. This period may extend to a couple of minutes if complications, such as arterial occlusion, occur. However, the animal's inverted position allows blood to flow more precipitously, thus making it highly unlikely for an animal to regain consciousness before it is fully exsanguinated. In any case, animal welfare advisory councils clearly emphasize that the time from incapacitation to the start of exsanguination should be prompt, recommending a time under 15 seconds.

Beyond the initial cost of purchasing a captive bolt, continued usage of the method is very inexpensive. The animal is incapacitated for the duration of the procedure, so it is one of the safest methods for the slaughterer.

=== In Jewish and Islamic slaughter ===
Jewish kashrut (kosher) and Islamic dhabihah (halal) dietary laws mandate that slaughter is performed with a cut that immediately severs the esophagus, trachea, and the large blood vessels in the neck, causing loss of consciousness and death by exsanguination. The double-edged pointed knife is prohibited. Instead, a long knife with a squared-off end is used that, in Jewish law, must be at least twice the width of the animal's neck. The operation of sticking or exsanguination is executed faster than when using the pointed knife, as four large blood vessels in the neck are severed simultaneously.

In Islamic and Jewish law, captive bolts and other methods of pre-slaughter paralysis are not permissible, as consumption of animals found dead are regarded as carrion and stunned animals that are later killed fall into this category. Various halal food authorities have more recently permitted the use of a recently developed fail-safe system of head-only stunning using a mushroom-shaped hammerhead that delivers a blow that is not fatal, proved by it being possible to reverse the procedure and revive the animal after the shock.

Such methods, particularly involving unstunned animals, have been criticized by veterinarians and animal welfare organizations, among others. Prohibitions against unstunned slaughter have been enacted in several countries. See Animal welfare controversies in shechita for further information.

== Suicide ==
Some methods of suicide, e.g., wrist slitting, rely on exsanguination as the mechanism of death.

== See also ==
- Hypovolemia
  - Hypovolemia#History (Desanguination)
- Slaughterhouse
- Tourniquet
- Thumping
