= Electrical water bath stunning =

Method to attempt making poultry unconscious

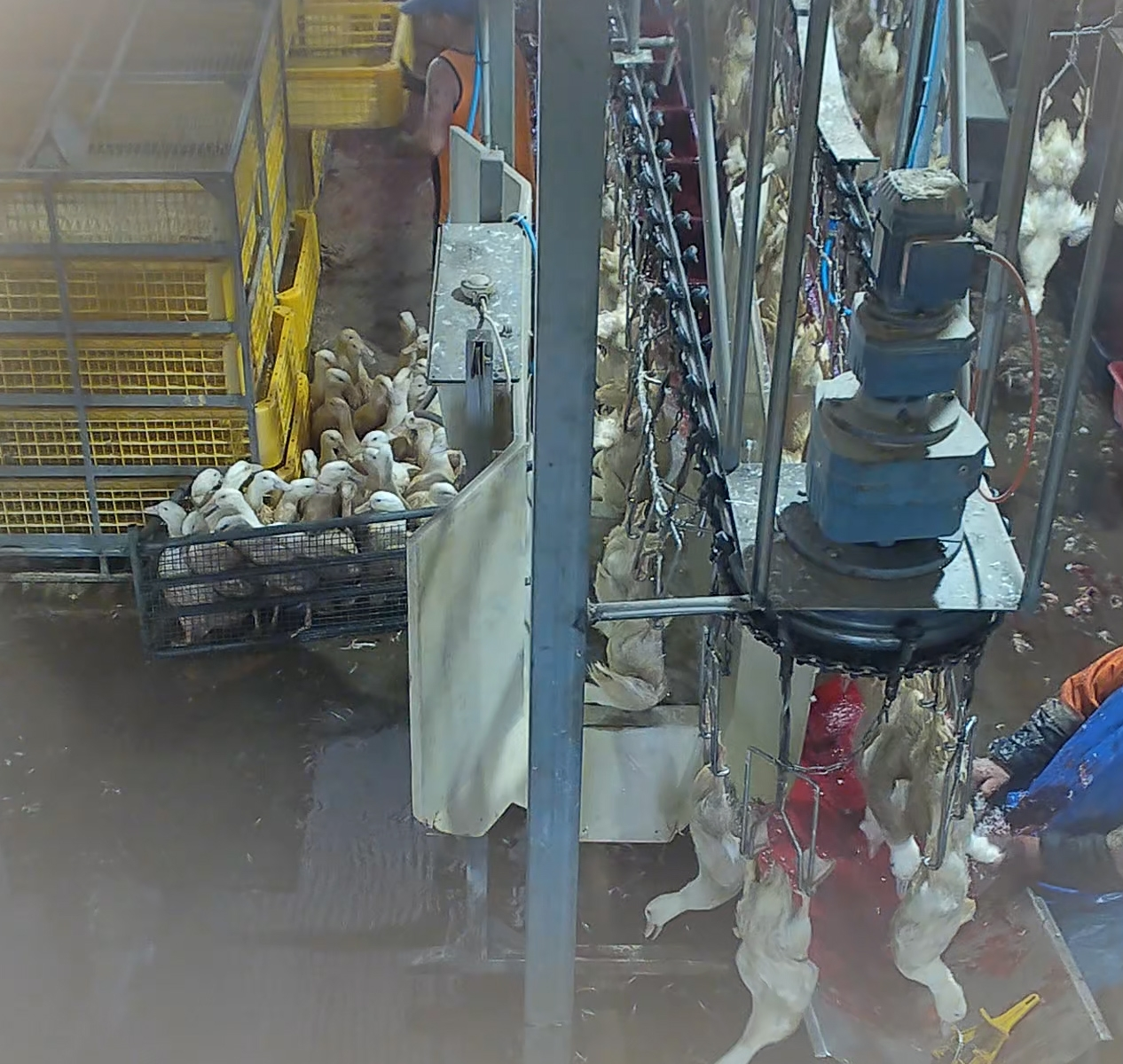
Live shackled birds going through an electric stun bath in the center

Electric water bath stunning is a widely used method for attempting to make poultry unconscious prior to slaughter. Typically, birds are briefly submerged in electrically charged water while being hung upside down. Efficacy varies, but one study found 1/3rd of birds are inadequately stunned and 1/3rd are put into cardiac arrest instead of stunned. The practice has received criticism from some scientists, animal welfare organizations, and animal rights groups.

== Electrical parameters ==
The specific alternating current frequency used impacts results. Higher frequencies are less effective at stunning, but low frequencies cause more muscle contractions, blood spattering, and broken bones.

Lower electrical voltage shows worse stunning effectiveness but is common. For instance, halal meat production often uses lower voltage due to concerns that high voltage often results in killing poultry via electrocution instead of stunning. Lower voltage is also associated with higher rates of broken bones, broken wings, bleeding, bruising, hematomas, and carcass condemnation.

The amount of current impacts effectiveness. The stated aim is to induce a seizure without inducing anything else. The lower end of current may only immobilize and still leave perception to pain and stress fully intact. The higher end of current will cause cardiac arrest and directly kill the birds.

== Pre-stun shocks ==
Some birds may receive shocks before making contact with the water. These are often regarded as painful. These shocks do not stun the birds, and they can make the bird's heads miss the water due to the flapping they cause. Prevalence varies by slaughterhouse, but pre-stun shocks can be common. A 2014 study in Paraná, Brazil found 49% of birds experienced pre-stun shocks. In 1996, the European Commission's Scientific Veterinary Committee found 80% of turkeys experienced pre-stun shocks.

== Controversy ==
Some scientists, animal welfare groups, and animal rights groups have criticized the use of the electrical water bath stunning. For instance, Mercy for Animals has called it ineffective. They point to high failure rates and research showing that the practice may just immobilize but not leave birds unconscious. Four Paws has called it "extremely distressing for the birds" and an unreliable method. The European Food Safety Authority has recommended alternatives be implemented and developed, but a 2012 European Commission report viewed it likely that electrical water bath stunning would remain common for economic reasons.

== See also ==
- Thumping
