= Bibek (Sikhism) =

Sikh culinary practice

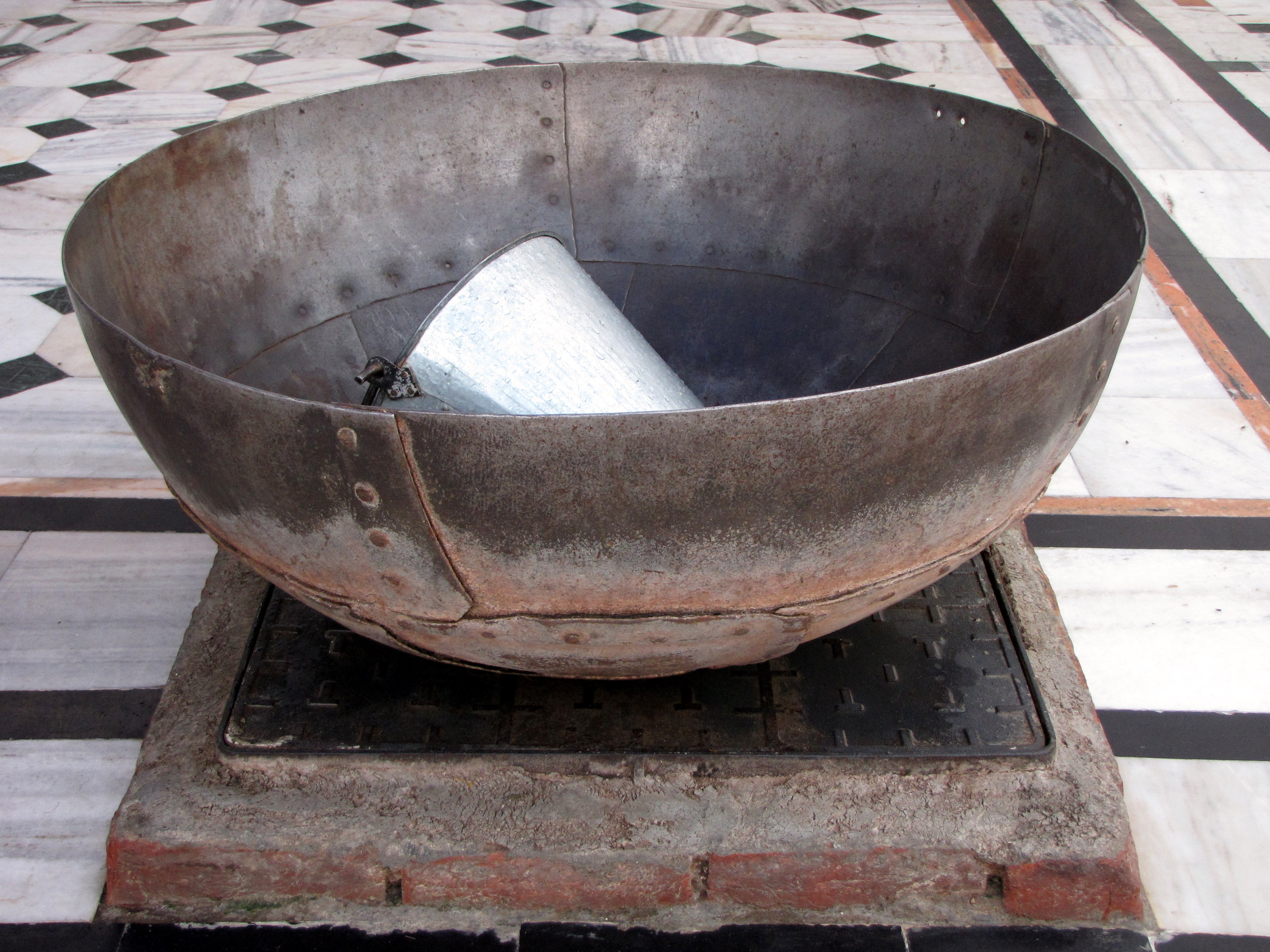
Photograph of a sarbloh vessel used by Sikhs, by Jasleen Kaur, 7 September 2009.

Bibek refers to a sectoral practice of some amritdhari Sikhs of only eating or drinking food prepared by them or by other Gursikhs, including only washing food with water drawn from a well by them, not eating fruits purchased at a market, or food prepared by their spouse. They are especially strict in observing the 5Ks, wearing them at all times. The practice is associated with the Akhand Kirtani Jatha, who follow it. Furthermore, they prepare their food in pure-iron or steel (known as sarbloh) vessels. Also, Nihangs eat using sarbloh utensils. The practice is also associated with Tapoban. Randhir Singh, founder of the AKJ, stated:

Without fully knowing the Rehat [practice] of a Gursikh, another Gursikh should not accept food from their hands. Further, one should not eat food made by them, nor should one share a Bata [cooking vessel] with them—this is forbidden for a Sachiyaar Sikh, and doing so (keeping this Rehat) is a very high Bibeki Karam. During the Amrit Sanchaar when all drink from the same Bata, it teaches us that we can only eat from those who keep the same Rehat as us.

— Randhir Singh, Gurmat Bibek, page 215

Sikhs who observed Bibek are termed Bibeki Akalis, Bibeki Singhs, or Bibekdharis. Bibek advocates claim the practice was found in Sikh history but went through a decline, citing sources such as Rehitnamas (namely Daya Singh's and Chaupa Singh's), the Sau Sakhi, and MacAuliffe to support their belief. Furthermore, proponents of bibeki expound on the medical belief that iron is healthy for humans as a mineral. Kahn Singh Nabha in the Mahan Kosh defines the terms bibek and vivek as synonymous, meaning "sense of discrimination". According to Paul Fieldhouse, the practice may derive from the fact that Guru Gobind Singh prepared Amrit Sanchar in an iron vessel.

== Aspects ==
Some aspects of AKJ bibeki are as follows:

- Not eating meat, fish, eggs, alcohol, tobacco, and non-medicinal drugs
- Not eating at restaurants
- Not eating processed food or machine-made foods
- Only eating food that had been prepared by an amritdhari Sikh
- Eating only using iron/carbon-steel (sarbloh) cutlery and utensils
- Only eating with and sharing food with people who follow bibeki rules

== See also ==
- Diet in Sikhism
- Meat consumption among Sikhs
- Jhatka
- Prohibitions in Sikhism
