= Cannabis and Sikhism =

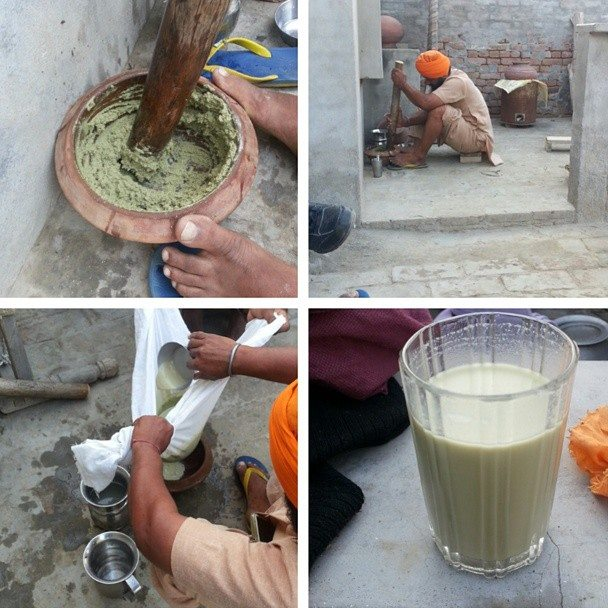
Process of making Shaheedi degh in a Sikh village in Punjab, India. On the Sikh army training day called Hola Moholla it is a customary tradition.

In Sikhism, some Sikhs particularly of the Nihang community use edible cannabis in a religious context. They make use of cannabis by ingestion. It is used to make a drink called Shaheedi Degh which is meant to help Nihang Singhs become highly present in the moment. Nihang Singhs used marijuana in the early times of Sikh history during times of battle, when it is believed to have helped them become more fierce warriors.

== Prohibition ==
The first Sikh guru, Guru Nanak, stated that using any mind altering substance (without medical purposes) is a distraction from God. Guru Nanak was offered bhang by the Mughal emperor Babur; Nanak however declined, and recited this shabad:

Fear of Thee, o Lord, is my bhang, and my mind the pouch in which I carry it. Intoxicated with this bhang I have abandoned all interest in worldly concerns.

The SGPC has also added a section in their rehait maryada (Sikh codes of conduct) that bans the Cannabis, opium and liquor for all Sikhs that follow its rehit maryada. The following is a translated quote from the rehait maryada. "A Sikh must not take hemp (cannabis), opium, liquor, tobacco, in short, any intoxicant. His only routine intake should be food."

The official Sikh Rehat Maryada (Sikh codes of conduct) bans the Cannabis, opium and liquor for all Sikhs that follow its rehit maryada. The following is a translated quote from the rehait maryada. "A Sikh must not take hemp (cannabis), opium, liquor, tobacco, in short, any intoxicant. His only routine intake should be food." An Amritdhari Sikh (one initiated via the Amrit Sanchar) is required to appear before the Panj Pyaare at their local Gurdwara, fully confess their lapse to the watching congregation and complete punishment to redeem their mistake, such as consuming intoxicants. The Panj Pyareare also empowered to re-order the Sikh to retake Amrit if they believe one of the four cardinal Sins have been committed, of which consuming intoxicants such as tobacco, alcohol and cannabis is one. The Sikh must fully complete whatever corrective punishment they are given in this process, which is required to be a form of service done with the hands, alongside retaking Amrit, although this is only if it is deemed necessary by the Panj Pyaare.

== Usage ==
Bhang (hemp) was a wild-growth plant found in the jungles of Punjab and along river-banks. An intoxicating drink can be produced by pounding the plant in a mortar and sifting it.

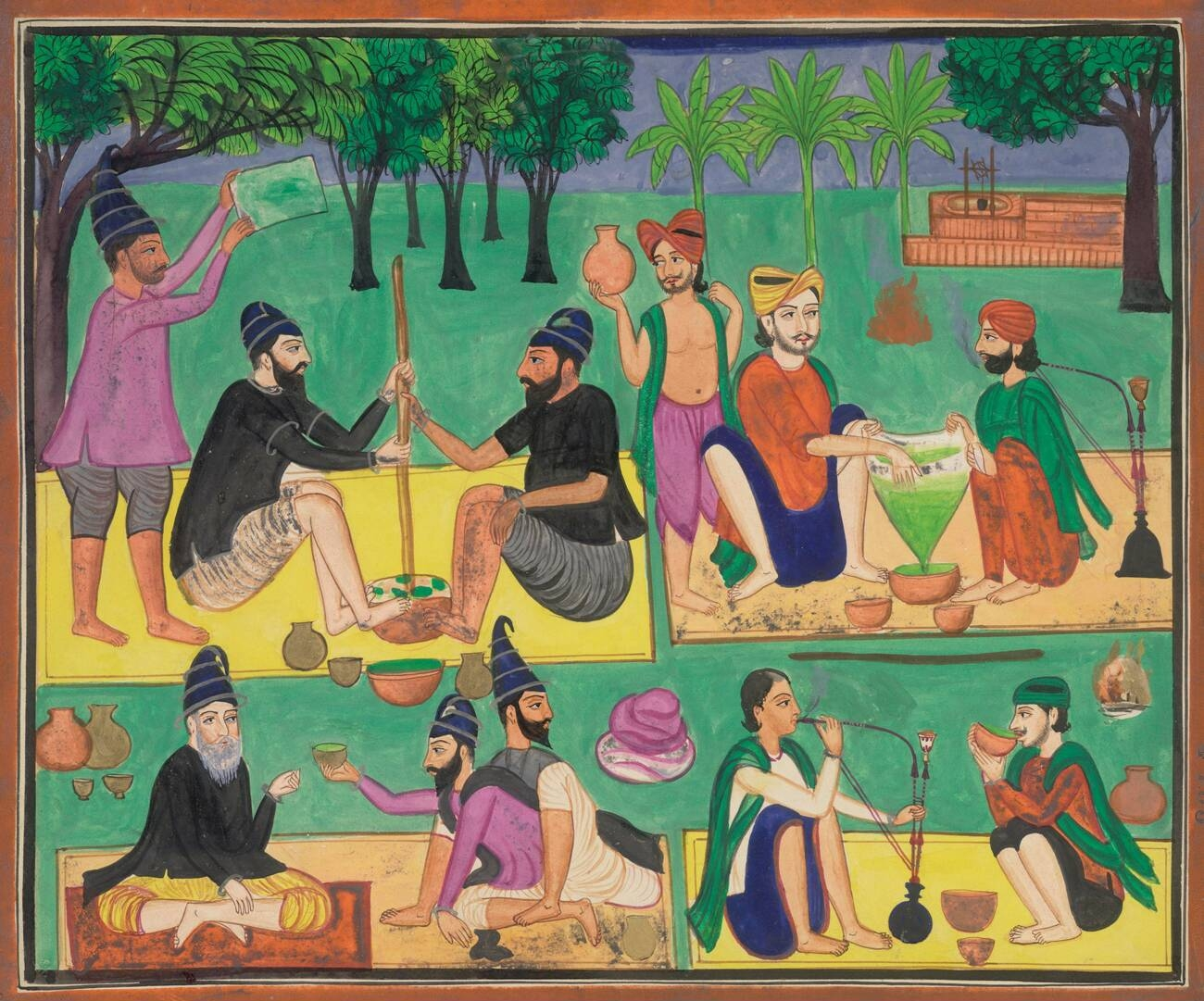
Gouache by an Amritsar artist depicting the preparation and consumption of Indian hemp (bhang), circa 1870.

The Sikhs inherited the tradition of drinking originates from the sixth Sikh guru, Guru Hargobind Sahib who started it to give sikhs Bir Ras (warrior spirit) and to get them energized, as Sikhs used to get up early for amrit vela and not go back to sleep till after the evening prayers of Sohila Sahib.

ਬਿਦਿਹ ਸਾਕੀਯਾ ਸਾਗ਼ਰੇ ਸਬਜ਼ ਗੂੰ ॥

‘Oh! Saki Give me the cup full of green (liquid)

ਕਿ ਮਾਰਾ ਬਕਾਰਸਤ ਜੰਗ ਅੰਦਰੂੰ ॥੨੦॥

‘Which I need at the time of struggle(20)

ਲਬਾਲਬ ਬਕੁਨ ਦਮ ਬਦਮ ਨੋਸ਼ ਕੁਨ ॥

‘Fill it up to the brim so that I can drink it with every breath

ਗ਼ਮੇ ਹਰ ਦੁ ਆਲਮ ਫ਼ਰਾਮੋਸ਼ ਕੁਨ ॥੨੧॥੧੨॥

‘And forget the afflictions of both the worlds(21)(12)

(Dasam Guru Granth Sahib, Ang 1428)

The Bhangi Misl of the Sikh Confederacy in the 18th century derived its name from bhang. The misl received its name "Bhangi" because Chhajja Singh and his soldiers frequently used the herbal intoxicant bhang (drink made from cannabis sativa).

=== Nihang Sikhs ===
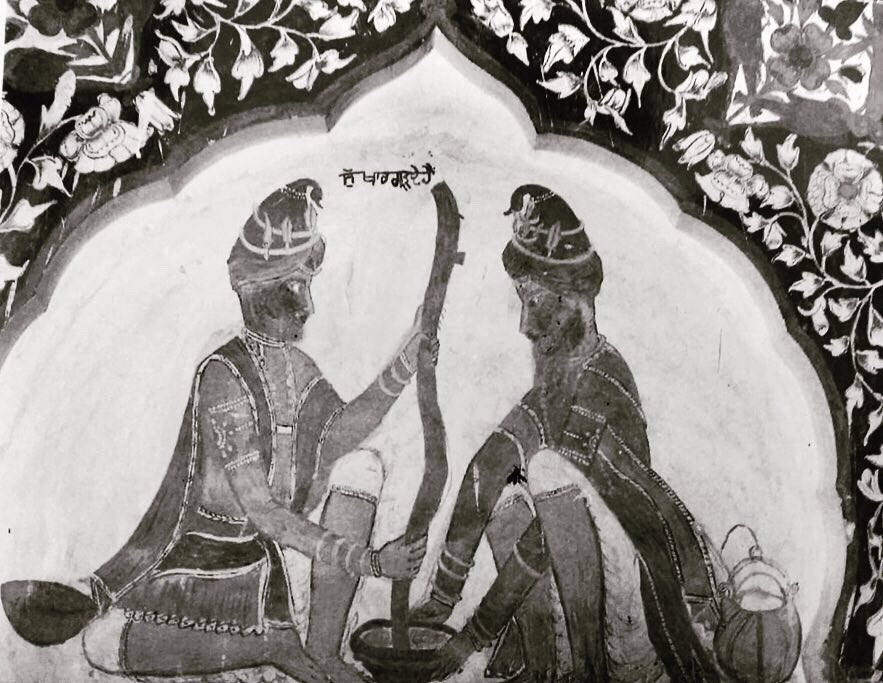
Mural of two Nihang Sikhs making Bhang or Sukh Nidhan.

In the modern day, cannabis consumption (but not smoking) is commonly associated with the Nihang Singhs, a sect who continue the orthodox Sikh warrior tradition, who consume drinks as sukha or sukhnidhaan, or more commonly shaheedi degha. Shaheedi degh is mostly used in Panjab on the Sikh holidays of Holla Mohalla and Vaisakhi. At many Sikh temples, including Takht Sachkhand Sri Hazur Sahib Ji, the shaheedi degh is offered as a holy food.

In 2001, Baba Santa Singh, the jathedar of Budha Dal, along with 20 Nihang jathadars (leaders), refused to accept the ban on the consumption of bhang by the SGPC. Baba Santa Singh was excommunicated for a different issue, and replaced with Balbir Singh, who agreed to shun the consumption of bhang.

Some Nihang groups consume cannabis or shaheedi degh (ਭੰਗ), purportedly to help in meditation. Sukhaa-parsaad (ਸੁੱਖਾਪ੍ਰਰਸਾਦ), "dry-sweet", is the term Nihang use to refer to it. It was traditionally crushed and taken as a liquid, especially during festivals like Hola Mohalla.

== See also ==
- Rehat – Sikh codes of conduct
- Diet in Sikhism – Views on what followers of Sikhism are permitted to eat
- Jhatka – Animal slaughter in Sikhism
- Meat consumption among Sikhs
- Prohibitions in Sikhism – List of banned practices in Sikhism
- Bhangi Misl – Sovereign state of the Sikh Confederacy (1748-1810)
