= Ritual slaughter =

Prescribed practice of slaughtering livestock for meat

Ritual slaughter is the practice of slaughtering livestock for meat in the context of a ritual. Ritual slaughter involves a prescribed practice of slaughtering an animal for food production purposes.

Ritual slaughter as a mandatory practice of slaughter for food production is practiced by some Muslim and Jewish communities. Both communities have similar religious philosophies in this regard. American scientist Temple Grandin has researched ritual slaughter practices and says that abattoirs which use recommended practices cause livestock little pain; she calls the UK debate over halal slaughterhouses misguided, and suggests that inhumane treatment of animals happens in poorly run slaughterhouses regardless of their halal status.

The Farm Animal Welfare Committee (FAWC), which advises British government on how to avoid cruelty to livestock, on the other hand, says the way Jewish kosher and Muslim halal meat is produced causes severe suffering to animals. Ritual slaughter is in many EU countries the only exception from the standard requirement, guarded by criminal law, to render animal unconscious before slaughter (before any cutting). While Jewish kosher law allows absolutely no stunning (rendering unconscious prior to cutting), many Muslims have accepted it as long as it can be shown that the animal could be returned to normal living consciousness (so that stunning does not kill an animal but is intended to render following procedures painless).

== History ==
Walter Burkert in Homo Necans discusses animal sacrifice as arising from the anthropological transition to hunting. With the domestication of livestock, the hunt was gradually replaced by the slaughter of livestock, and hunting rituals were consequently transformed to the context of slaughter.

In antiquity, ritual slaughter and animal sacrifice was one and the same. Thus, as argued by Detienne et al. (1989), for the Greeks, consumption of meat not slaughtered ritually was unthinkable, so that beyond being a tribute to the gods, Greek animal sacrifice marked a cultural boundary, separating "Hellenes" from "barbarians". Greek animal sacrifice was christianized into slaughter ceremonies involving Greek Orthodox Christian ritual, known as kourbania.

Ancient Egyptian slaughter rituals are frequently depicted in tombs and temples from the Old Kingdom onward. The standard iconography of the ritual involves a bull lying fettered on the ground with the butcher standing over it cutting its foreleg. The scene is attended by a woman and two priests.

== Jewish and Islamic ritual slaughter ==
Jewish and Islamic dietary laws require similar procedures for slaughtering animals. Ritual slaughter with a sharp knife is classified in the U.S. as 'humane' under the Humane Slaughter Act and practiced with no restrictions; in Europe, some countries have outlawed the practice as inhumane (see below).

According to Jewish and Muslim law, "slaughter is carried out with a single cut to the throat, rather than the more widespread practices of stunning with a bolt into the head before slaughter." The animal must be alive when its throat is cut and die from loss of blood. Any kind of prestunning for livestock to be slaughtered according to the Jewish Kosher practice has not yet been accepted.

=== Jewish Shechita ===
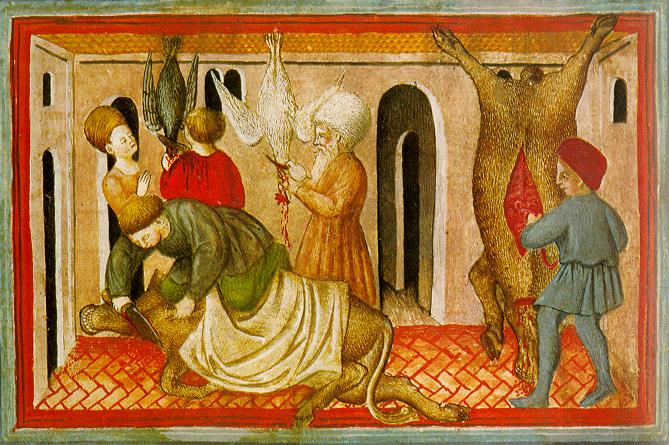
15th c. depiction of Jewish ritual slaughter of animals for consumption

Shechita (Hebrew: שחיטה) is the Jewish ritual slaughter for poultry and cattle for food according to Halakha. Talmud – Tractate Hulin Shulkhan Arukh Yore De'ah. The practice of slaughter of animals for food is the same as was used for Temple sacrifices, but since the destruction of the Jewish Temple in Jerusalem, sacrifices are prohibited. The Torah explains that animals not sacrificed must be slaughtered by the same practice, and today Shechita, kosher slaughtering does not include any religious ceremony, although the slaughtering practice may not be deviated from if the meat is to be consumed by Jews.

The act is performed by drawing a very sharp knife across the animal's throat making a single incision incising the trachea and esophagus. The carotid arteries are also cut, allowing the blood to drain out. The knife must also be perfectly smooth, and free of any nicks.

The animal must be killed by a shochet – a religious slaughterer also known in Hebrew as shochet ubodek (slaughterer and inspector). An inspection is mandatory and the animal is rejected for Jewish consumption if certain imperfections are discovered. A shochet must be a Jew in good standing in the community. The training period for a shochet varies, depending on the skill of the trainee. Qualifying as a slaughterer of only chickens can be achieved with a shorter period of study.

=== Islamic Ḏabīḥah ===
Ḏabīḥah (ذَبِيْحَة) is the practice prescribed in Islam for slaughtering all halal animals (goats, sheep, cattle, chickens, etc.), only excluding fish and most sea-life, according to Islamic law. This means that unlawful animals (pig, dog, lion, etc.) may not be slaughtered (dabihah). This practice of slaughtering halal animals needs several conditions to be fulfilled:

1. the butcher must follow an Abrahamic religion (ie. to be Muslim, Christian, or Jew);
2. the name of God should be called while slaughtering each halal animal separately;
3. the killing should consist of complete drainage of blood from the whole body by a swift, deep incision with a very sharp knife on the throat, cutting the wind pipe, jugular veins and carotid arteries of both sides but leaving the spinal cord intact. The objective of this technique is to drain the body of the animal's blood more effectively, resulting in more hygienic meat.

== High-volume ritual slaughter ==
Religious slaughter brings extra challenges for large, high-volume slaughterhouses where focus is on fast, cost-effective throughput. There has been reports that 3.2 cuts are in practice required for Jewish and 5.2 for halal slaughter. It was also reported that for 1 in 10 animals arteries of an animal are not correctly severed resulting in prolonged death.

== Legal restrictions on ritual slaughter ==
Legal requirements for ritual slaughter in Europe: Stunning not required Post-cut stunning required Simultaneous stunning required Pre-cut stunning required Ritual slaughter banned No data

A number of countries in Europe (as well as Australia) have issued restrictions or outright bans on ritual slaughter. As of 2018, Slovenia is the only European country which has prohibited ritual slaughter altogether. A number of other countries has introduced legal requirements for animals to be stunned either before or just after having their throats cut during ritual slaughter. The question whether animals should be stunned or not remains a hotly contested issue, where animal welfare concerns regularly clash with religious concerns.

Bans on ritual slaughter have been proposed or enacted in a number of European countries, from the 1840s onward. Most of them have been removed. Although ostensibly introduced for reasons of animal welfare, the consistent involvement of antisemites in the campaigns from the outset in the 1840s has, among other things led Pascal Krauthammer in a doctoral dissertation to conclude that the aim of the Swiss anti-Semitic campaign, that included elements from blood libel accusations in neighbouring countries, was to reimpose restrictions on Jews at a time when they were just beginning to achieve enfranchisement.

In 2014, Denmark ruled that Islamic and Jewish slaughter practices are inhumane, requiring that all animals be stunned before being killed for food, sparking a debate on religious freedom and the relative harms of different practices.

In 2019, Flanders and Wallonia banned kosher and halal slaughter when the animal is not stunned beforehand.

In 2020, a poll showed that 9 out of 10 Europeans wanted their governments to ban the slaughter of animals that have not been stunned.

In December 2020, the European Court of Justice ruled that member states of the EU may require prior reversible stunning. The European Court of Human Rights ruled similarly in 2024.

In 2025, a public petition in the UK to ban non-stun slaughter attracted almost 110,000 signatures and was debated in Parliament in June of that year. The Government ruled out an outright ban. However, it prompted the Food Policy Institute to recommend a quota system based on religious demand, as used in Germany.

== Ethnic and regional traditions ==
=== Bali ===
Bali (pronounced Ba-lee) or Bali Sacrifice (sometimes known as Jhatka Bali) is the ritual killing of an animal in Hinduism. Jhatka is the prescribed practice for Hindu ritual sacrifice, however other practices such as strangulation and the use of a wooden spile (sphya) driven into the heart is used. The reason for this is that priests saw the animal making a noise as a bad omen. Jhatka requires the instant killing of the animal in a single decapitating blow with an axe or sword. Those Hindus who do eat meat prescribe jhatka.

=== Jhatka goat sacrifice in Sikhism ===
Ritual jhatka sacrifice of goats is also practiced by some sections of Sikhs such as Hazuri Sikhs and Nihangs on certain events of religious significance.

Certain sections of Sikh society are opposed to this ritual and there exists a debate about its religious roots within Sikh society.

=== Africa ===
Ritual slaughter is practiced in various African traditional religions. Zulu slaughter rituals have led to controversy in South Africa.

Monica Hunter in her 1936 study of the Mpondo people of the Transkei described the ritual:

"When speaking to the ancestors was finished Sipopone [one of Hunter's informants] took the sacrificial spear of the umzi [homestead], passed it between the forelegs of the animal, and between its back legs, which were tied, then stabbed it in the stomach over the aorta muscle. The beast bellowed horribly, and lay in agony for about five minutes before it died."

The bellowing of the animal is supposed to represent communication with the ancestors. (David Welsh 2007)

== See also ==
- Animal sacrifice in Hinduism
- Comparison of Islamic and Jewish dietary laws
- Bullfighting a cultural, rather than religious practice of slaughter

== Literature ==
- "Regulating Slaughter: Animal Protection and Antisemitism in Scandinavia, 1880–1941," Patterns of Prejudice 23 (1989)
- M. Detienne, J.-P. Vernant (eds.), The Cuisine of Sacrifice among the Greeks, trans. Wissing, University of Chicago Press (1989).
- Roy A. Rappaport, Pigs for the Ancestors: Ritual in the Ecology of a New Guinea People (1969, 2000), ISBN 978-1-57766-101-6.
