= Wilhelm Schulz =

Wilhelm Schulz may refer to:

- Friedrich Wilhelm Schulz (1797–1860), German officer and radical-democratic publisher in Hesse
- Wilhelm Phillip Daniel Schulz (1805–1877), German mine engineer and geologist

== See also ==
- Wilhelm Schulze (1920–2002), German professor of veterinary medicine
