= Superstitions in Sikh societies =

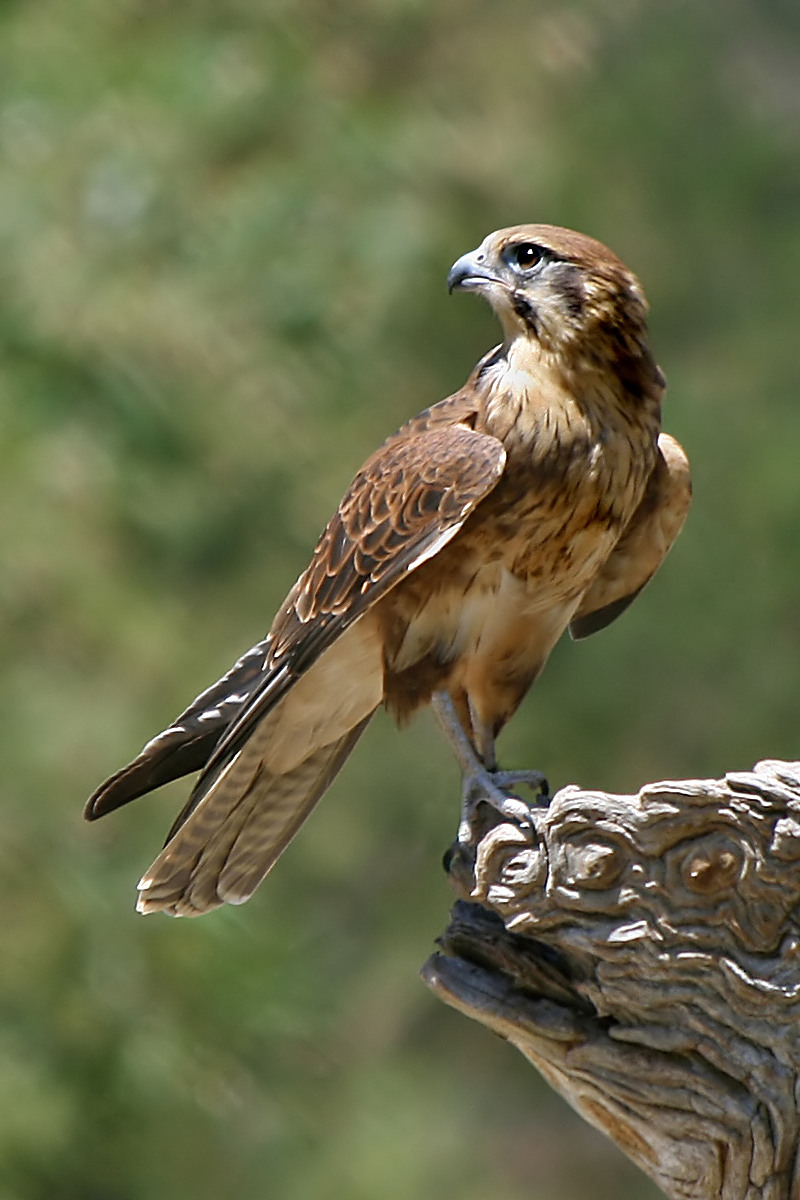
Sightings of the Northern goshawk (called 'Baaj' / ਬਾਜ਼ in Punjabi) are considered auspicious.

While Sikh theology and code of conduct is not supposed to approve of superstitions, in practice some Sikhs are observed to persist in some superstitious practices, including some of those followed due to the influence of other communities.

For example sneezing before an important event is considered inauspicious, and certain days of the week are considered taboo for washing hair. Newlyweds are welcomed by an oil pouring ritual. Sightings of a bird called 'Baaj' (variously translated as hawk/falcon/eagle) are considered auspicious. One of the points of the Sikh Rehat Maryada states that a single soul or entity existed in ten Gurus. Aartis are performed on certain occasions at certain places while rehat maryada does not prescribe the same. A substantial amount of milk is used to wash the floor of the Golden Temple. The Sikh diaspora is seen to compromise or oppose safety and security measures of various institutions of countries to maintain their hair-related practices.

== Instances of superstition from Sikh history ==
Ranjit Singh (13 November 1780 – 27 June 1839) was the most prominent leader of the Sikh empire and was known for following various superstitious practices. Ranjit Singh took important decisions relating to his expeditions by religiously consulting the holy scripture. In 1805 he took the difficult political decision of rejecting Raja Jaswant Singh Holkar of Bharatpur and decided to support the British by randomly putting two slips of papers in the Granth and extracting one that indicated an alliance with them. While Sikh scholar criticized Ranjit Singh for his superstitious beliefs akin to Hinduism, analysis by Harjot Oberoi found that in the 18 and 19th century the superstitions observed by Ranjeet Singh including worshiping multiple deities were common practice without any social stigma among the Sikh communities.

== See also ==
- Ardās
- Bhog#In Sikhism
- Cult of personality
- Gurmata
- Singh sabha
- Superstitions in India
- Superstitions in Muslim societies
- Prohibitions in Sikhism
