= Dhabihah =

Animal slaughter in Islamic law

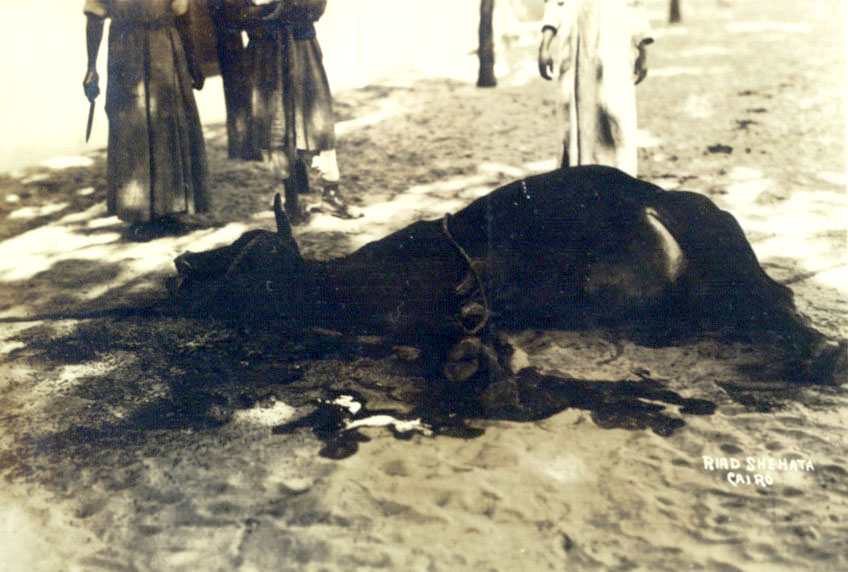
A ritual slaughter in Esna, Egypt, 1926

In Islamic law, dhabihah (Arabic: ذَبِيحَة, romanized: dhabīḥah; IPA: [ðaˈbiːħa]), also spelled zabiha, is the prescribed method of slaughter for halal animals (excluding sea animals, which are exempt from this requirement). It consists of a swift, deep incision to the throat with a very sharp knife, cutting the wind pipe, jugular veins and carotid arteries on both sides but leaving the spinal cord intact. The butcher is also required to call upon the name of Allah individually for each animal.

== Slaughtering process ==
Dhabīḥah is regulated by a set of rules intended to conform to Islamic religious law, which is derived from the Quran and hadiths.

=== Relevant verses of the Quran ===
The following verses of the Quran mention the items which are forbidden to be eaten in Islam; however, others have cited many other reasons that discourage the consumption of blood, pork, and carrion.

He has only forbidden you what dies of itself, and blood, and flesh of swine, and that over which any other (name) than (that of) Allah has been invoked; but whoever is driven to necessity, not desiring, nor exceeding the limit, no sin shall be upon him; surely Allah is Forgiving, Merciful.

— Qurʼan, Surah 2 (al-Baqarah), ayah 173

Forbidden to you (for food) are: dead meat, blood, the flesh of swine, and that on which has been invoked the name of other than Allah; that which hath been killed by strangling, or by a violent blow, or by a headlong fall, or by being gored to death; that which hath been (partly) eaten by a wild animal; unless ye are able to slaughter it (in due form); that which is sacrificed on stone (altars); (forbidden) also is the division (of meat) by raffling with arrows: that is impiety. This day have those who reject faith given up all hope of your religion: yet fear them not but fear Me. This day have I perfected your religion for you, completed My favour upon you, and have chosen for you Islam as your religion. But if any is forced by hunger, with no inclination to transgression, Allah is indeed Oft-forgiving, Most Merciful.

— Qurʼan, Surah 5 (al-Maʼidah), ayah 3

This day (all) the good things are allowed to you; and the food of those who have been given the Book is lawful for you and your food is lawful for them; and the chaste from among the believing women and the chaste from among those who have been given the Book before you (are lawful for you); when you have given them their dowries, taking (them) in marriage, not fornicating nor taking them for paramours in secret; and whoever denies faith, his work indeed is of no account, and in the hereafter he shall be one of the losers.

— Qurʼan, Surah 5 (al-Maʼidah), ayah 5

Therefore eat of that on which Allah's name has been mentioned if you are believers in His communications.

— Qurʼan, Surah 6 (al-Anʻam), ayah 118

Say: I do not find in that which has been revealed to me anything forbidden for an eater to eat of except that it be what has died of itself, or blood poured forth, or flesh of swine-- for that surely is unclean-- or that which is a transgression, other than (the name of) Allah having been invoked on it; but whoever is driven to necessity, not desiring nor exceeding the limit, then surely your Lord is Forgiving, Merciful.

— Qurʼan, Surah 6 (al-Anʻam), ayah 145

He has only forbidden to you dead animals, blood, the flesh of swine, and that which has been dedicated to other than Allah. But whoever is forced [by necessity], neither desiring [it] nor transgressing [its limit] - then indeed, Allah is Forgiving and Merciful.

— Qurʼan, Surah 16 (an-Nahl), ayah 115

=== Prerequisites ===
According to the laws of dhabīḥah ḥalāl, certain requirements must be met before an animal is slaughtered:

- The animal must not be a forbidden substance as per the Quran and the Sunnah.
- The slaughter itself must be done by a sane (mentally competent) adult Muslim.
- While textual evidence in Quran suggests that no other name than Allah be pronounced while slaughtering, some Muslim scholars hold that mentioning God's name at the time of slaughter is a must; they differ as to whether or not forgetting to do so or leaving it off intentionally at the time of slaughter renders the sacrifice void and the meat thus forbidden for consumption. The majority of scholars hold the opinion that mentioning God's name is obligatory. They support Quranic view of slaughtering as the supreme law. They also agree that if other than God's name is mentioned then this would be forbidden, due to the verse 5:3 "Forbidden for you are carrion, and blood, and flesh of swine, and that which has been slaughtered while proclaiming the name of any other than God, and one killed by strangling, and one killed with blunt weapons, and one which died by falling, and that which was gored by the horns of some animal, and one eaten by a wild beast, except those whom you slaughter; and that which is slaughtered at the altar and that which is distributed by the throwing of arrows [for an omen]; this is an act of sin." —– al-Maʼidah 5:3
- In order for these traditions to take part in the United States, certain governmental regulations, enforced by acts, such as the Humane Slaughter Act require various prerequisites to be in place before any ritual or slaughter of any kind is permitted. This includes faiths such as Islam, for Halal processing, and Judaism, for Kosher processing. Regulations include that the animal be completely insensitive to pain before killing it, typically by a technique like electronarcosis.

=== Islamic slaughtering ===
The act of slaughtering itself is preceded by mentioning the name of God. Invoking the name of God at the moment of slaughtering is sometimes interpreted as acknowledgment of God's right over all things and thanking God for the sustenance he provides: it is a sign the food is taken not in sin or in gluttony, but to survive and praise Allah, as the most common blessing is, Bismillah, or "In the name of God".

According to Islamic tradition, the animal is brought to the place of slaughter and laid down gently so as to not injure it. It is sunnah (tradition) but not fard (God's requirement) that the head of the animal be facing the Qibla. The blade must be kept hidden until the very last moment while the jugular of the animal is felt. The conventional method used to slaughter the animal involves cutting the large arteries in the neck along with the esophagus and trachea with one swipe of a non-serrated blade. Care must be taken that the nervous system is not damaged, as this may cause the animal to die before exsanguination has taken place. During the swipe of the blade, the head must not be decapitated, since it is impermissible for the blade to touch the spinal cord. While blood is draining, the animal is not handled until it has died. While this is an acceptable method, the Egyptian Fatwa Committee has agreed that an animal can be rendered insensible to pain via electronarcosis and still be halal.

It is also compulsory that each animal must be slaughtered individually and in seclusion, according to some schools of thought. In a poultry farm or slaughter house, one animal must not witness another animal being slaughtered as it is makruh.

Within the Shia school (followers of Ayatullah Sistani), slaughter of multiple animals at the same time, using a fully automated slaughterhouse is considered sufficient if specific conditions are met.

This method adheres to Islamic law (it ensures the animal does not die by any of the Haraam methods) and helps to effectively drain blood from the animal. This may be important because the consumption of blood itself is forbidden in Islam;^{[Quran 2:173]} however, it is not clear that bleeding the animal removes all traces of blood from the carcass, so the meat may remain unclean. In fact, it is stated by Islamic authorities that it is only necessary to drain "most" of the blood from the animal.

=== Inducing unconsciousness ===
Many Muslims are against the use of any stunning technique on the animals, even if non fatal.

Halal slaughter requires that the animal dies from the knife cut to the throat, and that pre-slaughter stunning must not kill the animal, precluding the use of bolt-guns, which can cause instant death. In premises that undertake halal slaughter, reversible electrical stunning may be used to non-lethally render animals unconscious for the duration of the slaughter process, thus meeting both animal welfare and halal requirements.

For cattle, halal slaughter often uses head-only electrical stunning, which requires the bovine to be bled within 10 seconds. The use of electronarcosis for larger animals was pronounced to be licit within an Islamic context as early as 1978 by the Egyptian Fatwa Committee. Despite the feasibility of stunning within the halal framework, the practice has faced ongoing pushback from some Muslim communities decades on.

== Animal welfare ==
Opponents of dhabīḥah ḥalāl, most notably some animal welfare groups, contend that some methods of slaughter "cause severe suffering to animals" compared to when the animal is stunned before slaughter, with some religious groups – such as the Egyptian Fatwa Committee – agreeing to the electronarcosis as a methods of slaughter on this basis. It is argued that slaughter without prior stunning leaves the spinal cord, and thus the capacity to feel pain until death, intact.

However, some other Muslim groups counter allegations of cruelty to animals by referring to animal welfare issues arising from pre-stunning animals before slaughter.

=== In the United Kingdom ===
In 2003, Compassion in World Farming supported recommendations made by the UK's Farm Animal Welfare Council, the government's animal welfare advise committee, of outlawing slaughter without stunning, stating that "We believe that the law must be changed to require all animals to be stunned before slaughter." The council's recommendations were that slaughter without pre-stunning was "unacceptable", and that the exemption of religious practices under the Welfare of Animals (Slaughter or Killing) Regulations 1995 should be repealed.

In 2004, the government issued its response to the FAWC's 2003 report in the form of a consultation document, indicating that the government was not intending to adopt the FAWC's recommendation to repeal religious exemptions to the Welfare of Animals Regulations (1995), but that it might consider implementing the labelling of meat originating from animals slaughtered without pre-stunning on a voluntary basis. The RSPCA responded to the government's consultation and urged it to consider the animal welfare implications of allowing continuation of slaughter without pre-stunning, as well as pressing for compulsory labelling of meat from animals slaughtered in this way.

However, in its final response to the FAWC report in March 2005, the government again stated that it would not change the law and that slaughter without pre-stunning would continue to be permitted for Jewish and Muslim groups.

In April 2008, the UK government's Food and Farming minister, Lord Rooker, stated his belief that halal and kosher meat should be labeled when sold, in order for members of the public to have choice over their purchases. Rooker stated that "I object to the method of slaughter ... my choice as a customer is that I would want to buy meat that has been looked after, and slaughtered in the most humane way possible." The RSPCA supported Lord Rooker's views.

In 2009, the FAWC again advised on ending practices of slaughtering wherein animals were not stunned before their throats were cut, stating that "significant pain and distress" was caused by leaving the spinal cord of the animal intact. However, the council also recognised the difficulties of reconciling scientific matters and those of faith, urging the government to "continue to engage with religious communities" as part of making progress. In response to outreach from The Independent, Massood Khawaja, then-president of the Halal Food Authority, stated that all animals passing through slaughterhouses regulated by its organisation were stunned, in comparison to those regulated to another authority on halal slaughter, the Halal Monitoring Committee. Halal and kosher butchers denied the FAWC's findings of cruelty in slaughter without pre-stunning, and expressed anger over the FAWC recommendation. Majid Katme of the Muslim Council of Britain also disagreed, stating that "it's a sudden and quick hemorrhage. A quick loss of blood pressure and the brain is instantaneously starved of blood and there is no time to start feeling any pain."

=== Worldwide ===
Various research papers on cattle slaughter collected by Compassion In World Farming mention that "after the throat is cut, large clots can form at the severed ends of the carotid arteries, leading to occlusion of the wound" (or "ballooning" as it is known in the slaughtering trade). Nick Cohen wrote in the New Statesman, "Occlusions slow blood loss from the carotids and delay the decline in blood pressure that prevents the suffering brain from blacking out. In one group of calves, 62.5 percent suffered from ballooning. Even if the cut to the neck is clean, blood is carried to the brain by vertebral arteries and it keeps cattle conscious of their pain." Cohen also wrote that "Experiments carried out by the principal of the Royal Veterinary College of Sweden (Veterinärhögskolan) by order of the Swedish government in 1925 and published in 1928 determined that the blood carried to the brain by the vertebral arteries in bovines is reduced after slaughter by the Jewish shehitah method from 1/30 to 1/40, and on the basis of this and one other experiment Professor Axel Sahlstedt declared the method humane and not cruel. However, on the basis of other experiments that had shown different results, Sahlstedt recommended post-stunning as standard.

However, between 1974 and 1978, Wilhelm Schulze and his colleagues carried out a study at the School of Veterinary Medicine, Hannover University in Germany: "Attempts to Objectify Pain and Consciousness in Conventional (captive bolt pistol stunning) and Ritual (knife) Methods of Slaughtering Sheep and Calves" is reported on Islamic websites to have concluded that "the Islamic way of slaughtering is the most humane method of slaughter and that captive bolt stunning, practiced in the West, causes severe pain to the animal." However, recent studies have countered the Schulze study, which is dated and relied on older EEG measurement techniques. Dr. Schulze himself also warned in his report that the stunning technique may not have functioned properly.

For the Food and Agriculture Organization of the United Nations and the Humane Society International, "the animals that are slaughtered according to kosher and halal should be securely restrained, particularly the head and neck, before cutting the throat" as "movements (during slaughter) results in a poor cut, bad bleeding, slow loss of consciousness, if at all, and pain."

In Europe, the DIALREL project addressed religious slaughter issues by gathering and disseminating information and by encouraging dialogue between the spiritual and scientific communities. Funding for DIALREL was provided by The European Commission, and it began functioning in November 2006. DIALREL produced many fact sheets and ultimately published a final report in 2010, "Report on good and adverse practices – Animal welfare concerns in relation to slaughter practices from the viewpoint of veterinary sciences." This study concluded that Halal methods of slaughter were both more distressing and painful for the animals even under optimal conditions (and that conditions were rarely optimal in actual practice), and that it overall caused significantly more suffering than non-religious methods of slaughter.

Certain Muslim and Jewish communities expressed frustration with the process of dialogue skewed for non-religious audiences.

Research undertaken in 2010 by Meat & Livestock Australia on animal pain and distress concluded, "technologies available to alleviate such suffering overwhelmingly supports the use of pre-slaughter stunning".

== Ritual slaughter in other religions ==
Followers of some religions are prohibited from consuming meat slaughtered in the fashion described above. The Rehat Maryada of Sikhism states that in Sikhism, "consumption of any meat killed in a ritualistic manner" is strictly prohibited, therefore prohibiting both halal and kosher meat.

=== Judaism ===
There are many similarities between the rules concerning dhabihah and shechita, Jewish ritual slaughter.

Muslims are divided as to whether or not Jewish slaughter suffices as a replacement for Islamic dhabihah halal. Some claim that Jewish slaughter leaves out the takbīr (saying "allahu akbar" ["God is great"]) and changes the method of slaughter; thus, their meat is haraam. Others claim that the slaughtering processes are similar enough in practice and in theory to render animals slaughtered by Jewish laws as halal.

Jeremiah J Berman wrote in 1941: "At the present day in most of the Islamic world Muslims purchase Jewish meat, though they will not buy Christian meat. This is true in Istanbul, Beirut, Jerusalem and Mogador. Contemporary Muslims in these cities consider Jewish slaughtering as fulfilling all the requirements of their law, while they regard the slaughtering performed by Christians as done in contravention thereof. In Yemen ... Jewish meat is not acceptable." Berman also reports that Jewish meat slaughtered in Salonica (Thessaloniki) was not acceptable to Muslims.

To be kosher, fit for consumption by those of the Jewish faith, meat must be slaughtered by a Jewish shohet who holds a license from a rabbi and has been examined on the laws of shechitah. This alone means that halal meat is forbidden to those of the Jewish faith. The requirements for the shape of the knife are more severe, the knife must be free from a single nick and the method of cutting is exactly defined. In addition, there is an inspection of the lungs (bedikah) that mammals must pass, which Muslims do not have.

== See also ==
- Halal
- Kosher
- Shechita, Jewish method of ritual slaughter
- Jhatka
- Legal aspects of ritual slaughter
- Islamic dietary laws
- Christian dietary laws
- Comparison of Islamic and Jewish dietary laws
- Ike jime
- Qurbani
