= Diet in Sikhism =

Views on what followers of Sikhism are permitted to eat

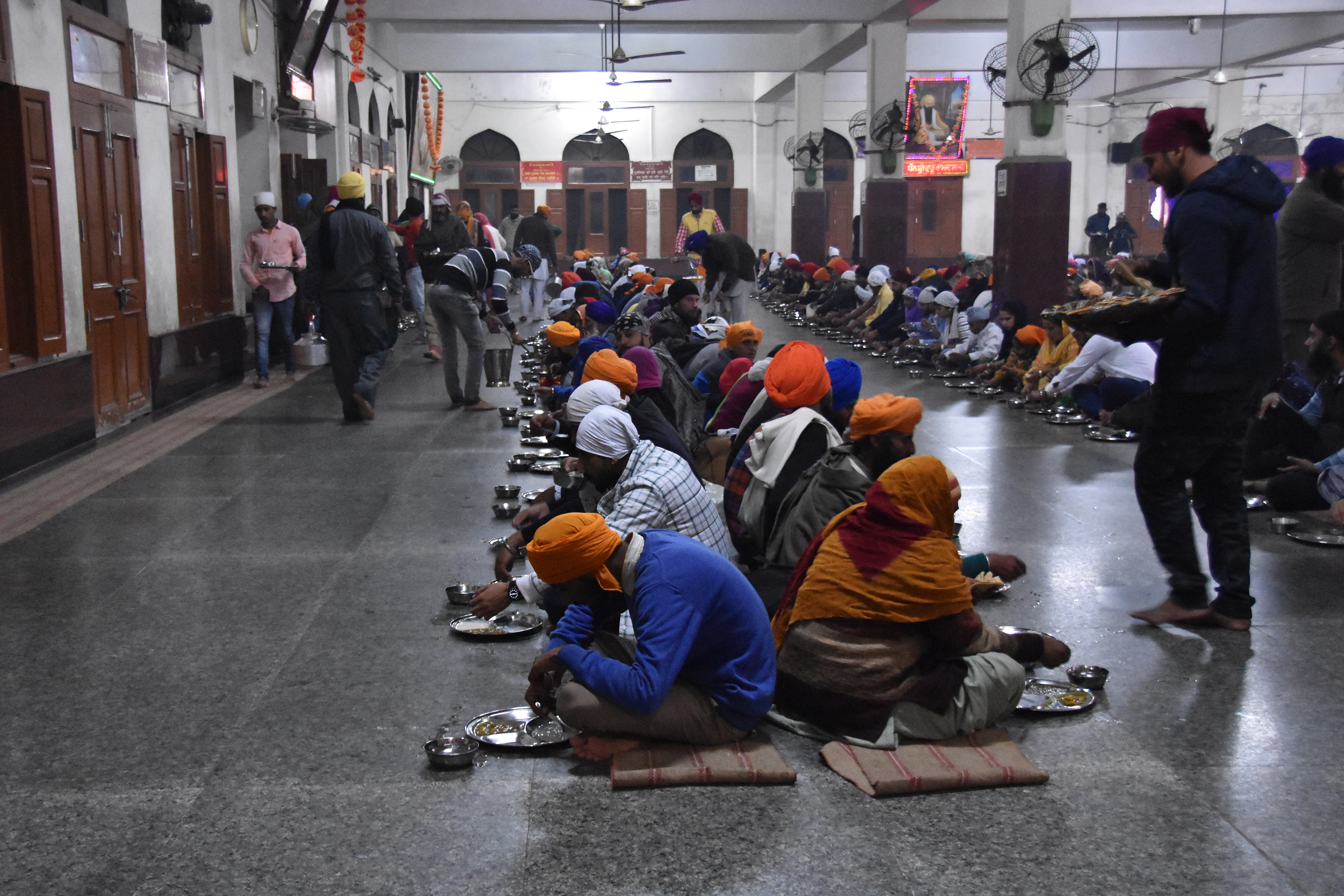
Langar communal meal being held at the Golden Temple complex in Amritsar, Punjab, northern India, 20 November 2017

Followers of Sikhism do not have a preference for meat or vegetarian consumption. There are two views on initiated or "Amritdhari Sikhs" and meat consumption. "Amritdhari" Sikhs (i.e. those that follow the Sikh Rehat Maryada - the Official Sikh Code of Conduct) can eat meat (provided it is not Kutha meat). "Amritdharis" that belong to some Sikh sects (e.g. Akhand Kirtani Jatha, Damdami Taksal, Namdhari) are vehemently against the consumption of meat and eggs.

The Sikh Gurus have indicated their preference for a simple diet, which could include meat or be vegetarian. Guru Nanak said that overconsumption of food i.e. Lobh (Greed) involves a drain on the Earth's resources and thus on life. In the case of meat, passages from the Guru Granth Sahib (the holy book of Sikhs, also known as the Adi Granth) say that fools argue over this issue. The tenth guru, Guru Gobind Singh, prohibited the Sikhs from the consumption of Kutha (any ritually slaughtered) meat because of the Sikh belief that sacrificing an animal in the name of God is mere ritualism (something to be avoided).

In Sikhism, only lacto-vegetarian food is served in the Gurdwara (Sikh temple) but Sikhs are not bound to be meat-free. The general consensus is that Sikhs are free to choose whether to adopt a meat diet or not.

== Langar ==
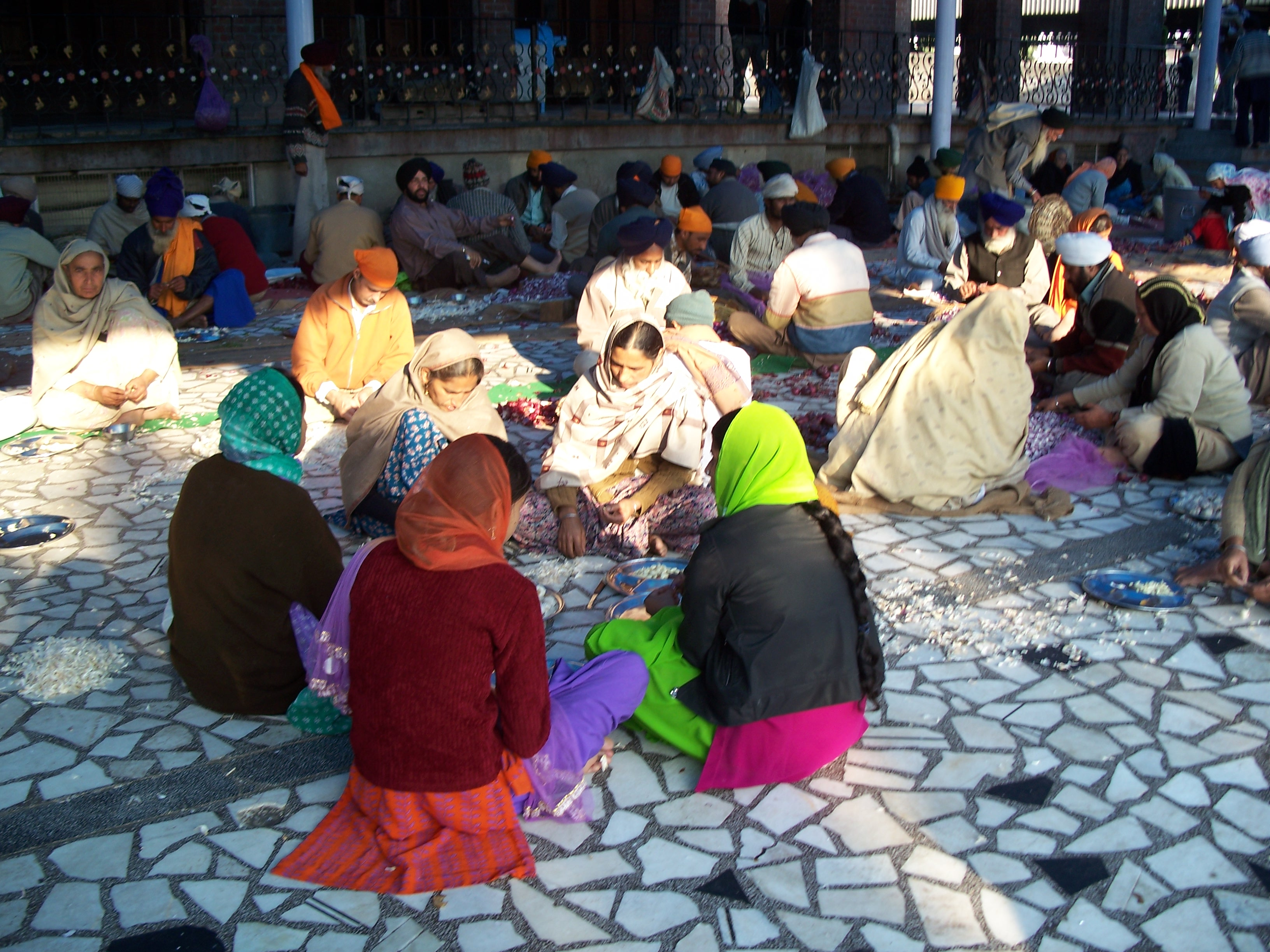
Volunteers preparing langar at the Golden Temple complex in Amritsar, India, 9 January 2007

Within the gurdwara, the Guru ka Langar (Guru's community kitchen) serves purely lacto-vegetarian food because the Langar is open to all. Since people of many faiths have varying dietary taboos, and since Sikhs accept these restrictions and accommodate people regardless of their faith or culture, the Sikh Gurus adopt vegetarian food for Langar. Meat was included in langar at the time of Guru Angad, but was discontinued to accommodate Vaishnavites.

== Reincarnation ==
Sikhism argues that the soul can possibly undergo millions of transformations as various forms of life before ultimately becoming human. These life forms could be a mineral, vegetation, or an animal. Sikhism does not see a difference between these types of existence, however the human has a privileged position compared to other life forms. In terms of the Sikh view of karma, human life is seen as being most precious, and animal, vegetable, and mineral all viewed as being equally below human life. Therefore, Sikhs view eating an animal is the same as eating a plant or mineral.

== Viewpoints ==
=== Guru Granth Sahib ===
According to Surjit Singh Gandhi, the Guru Granth Sahib on page 472 and Guru Nanak in early 16th century said that "avoidance of flesh as food was impractical and impossible so long as they used water, since water was the source of all life and the first life principle". Guru Nanak states that all living beings are connected. Even meat comes from the consumption of vegetables, and all forms of life are based on water.

O Pandit, you do not know where did flesh originate! It is water where life originated and it is water that sustains all life. It is water that produces grains, sugarcane, cotton and all forms of life.

— Guru Granth Sahib 1290

=== Akal Takht ruling ===
The Akal Takht (Central Body for Sikh Temporal Affairs) represents the final authority on controversial issues concerning the Sikh Panth (community or collective). The Hukamnama (edict or clarification), issued by the Jathedar of the Akal Takht (head priest or head caretaker) Sadhu Singh Bhaura dated February 15, 1980, states that eating meat does not violate the code of conduct (Kurehit) of the Sikhs; Amritdhari Sikhs can eat meat as long as it is Jhatka meat.

==== Disagreement with the ruling ====
Some religious sects of Sikhism—Damdami Taksal, Akhand Kirtani Jatha, Namdharis, Guru Nanak Nishkam Sewak Jatha and the 3HO—believe that the Sikh diet should be meat-free. The reason for the disagreement with this ruling is that these sects had many Vaishnav converts to Sikhism who were staunchly vegetarian.

The Akhand Kirtani Jatha dispute the meaning of the word "kutha", claiming it means all meat. However, in mainstream Sikhism this word has been accepted to mean that which has been prepared according to Muslim rituals.

=== Sikh Rehat Maryada ===
According to the Sikh code of conduct or Rehat Maryada, Sikhs are free to choose whether or not to include meat in their diet.

In the Rehat Maryada, Article XXIV - Ceremony of Baptism or Initiation (page 38), it states:

The undermentioned four transgressions (tabooed practices) must be avoided:

1. Dishonouring the hair
2. Eating the meat of an animal slaughtered the Halal way
3. Cohabiting with a person other than one's spouse
4. Using tobacco.

— Sikh Rehat Maryada

The Sikh Rehat Maryada states that Sikhs cannot consume meat that is Halal (Muslim), or Kosher (Jewish).

=== Sikh intellectual views ===
I. J. Singh states that throughout Sikh history, there have been many subsects of Sikhism that have espoused vegetarianism. However, this was rejected by the Sikh Gurus. Sikhs consider that vegetarianism and meat-eating are unimportant in the realm of Sikh spirituality. Surinder Singh Kohli links vegetarianism to Vashnavite behaviour. Gopal Singh, commenting on meat being served in the langar during the time of Guru Angad Gyani Sher Singh—who was the head priest at the Darbar Sahib—notes that ahimsa does not fit in with Sikh doctrine. W. Owen Cole and Piara Singh Sambhi comment that if the Sikh Gurus had made an issue on vegetarianism, it would have distracted from the main emphasis of Sikh spirituality. H. S. Singha and Satwant Kaur comment on how ritually-slaughtered meat is considered a sin for initiated Sikhs. G. S. Sidhu also notes that ritually-slaughtered meat is taboo for a Sikh. Gurbakhsh Singh comments on how non-Kutha meat is acceptable for the Sikhs. Surinder Singh Kohli comments on the "fools wrangle over flesh" quotation from the Guru Granth Sahib by noting how Guru Nanak mocked hypocritical vegetarian priests. Gobind Singh Mansukhani states how vegetarianism and meat-eating has been left to the individual Sikh. Devinder Singh Chahal comments on the difficulties of distinguishing between plant and animal in Sikh philosophy. H. S. Singha comments in his book how the Sikh Gurus ate meat. Khushwant Singh also notes that most Sikhs are meat-eaters and decry vegetarians as daal khorey (lentil-eaters).

=== Sikh Kharku view ===
In early 1987 Kharkus issued a moral code banning the sale and consumption of meat. The ban led to much of Punjab being without meat. Those who continued to sell or eat meat risked death and commonly would have their businesses destroyed and be killed. One survey found that there were no meat or tobacco shops between Amritsar and Phagwara. In the peak of the militancy most of Punjab was meatless. Famous restaurants that served meat had removed it from their menu and denied ever serving it. The ban was popular among rural Sikhs. Kharkus justified the ban by saying, "No avatars, Hindu or Sikh, ever did these things. To eat meat is the job of rakshasas (demons) and we don't want people to become rakshasas."

== Historical dietary behaviour of Sikhs ==
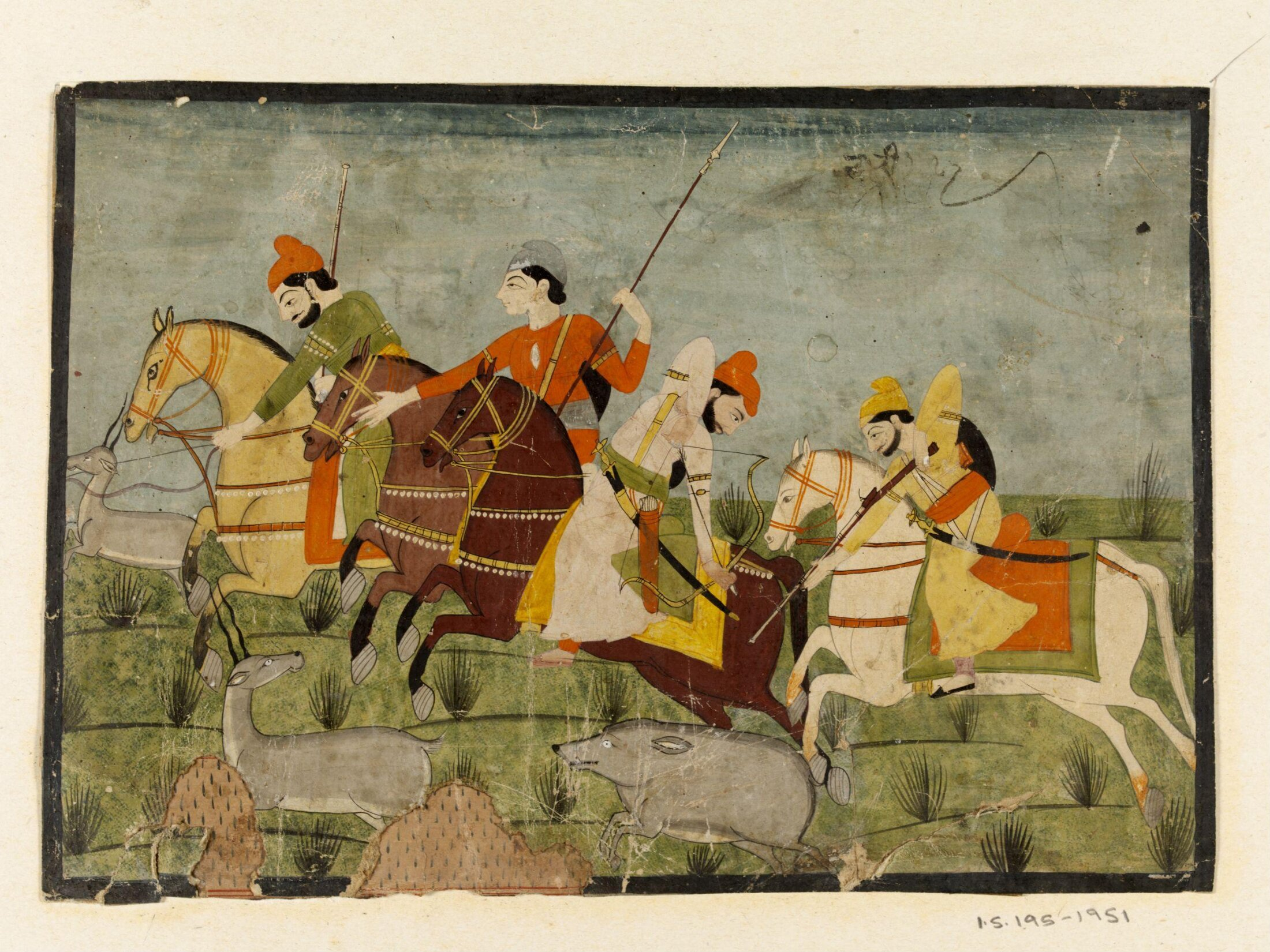
Painting depicting Sikh horsemen hunting boar and deer, circa 1790

According to Dabistan-e-Mazhib (a contemporary Persian chronology of the Sikh Gurus), Guru Nanak did not eat meat, and Guru Arjan thought that meat eating was not in accordance with Nanak's wishes. This differs from I. J. Singh's research that states that Guru Nanak ate meat on the way to Kurukshetra. According to Persian records, Guru Hargobind (the 6th Guru) ate meat and hunted, and his practice was adopted by most Sikhs.

== Dietary avoidance out of politeness ==
Sikhs also generally avoid eating beef because the cow, the buffalo and the ox are an integral part of rural Sikh livelihoods. Similarly, Sikhs may avoid eating beef in the company of Hindus and avoid eating pork in the company of Muslims out of respect for their shared values. However, there is no religious prohibition about eating beef and pork.

== Sarbloh Bibek ==
Some Sikh groups like Akhand Kirtani Jatha keep Sarbloh Bibek. Sikhs who follow this practice eat from iron bowls and iron plates only.

Another key aspect to maintaining Sarbloh Bibek is that Sikhs must only eat food prepared by other Amritdhari (baptized) Sikhs. Amritdhari Sikhs are also not to eat Jootha food (previously eaten food) from non-Amritdharis.

== See also ==
- Vegetarianism
- Chapati
- Meat consumption among Sikhs
- Jhatka
- Rehat
- Prohibitions in Sikhism
