= Legal aspects of ritual slaughter =

Legal requirements for ritual slaughter around the world: Stunning not required Post-cut stunning required Simultaneous stunning required Pre-cut stunning required Ritual slaughter banned No data

The legal aspects of ritual slaughter include the regulation of slaughterhouses, butchers, and religious personnel involved with traditional shechita (Judaism) and dhabiha (Islam). Regulations also may extend to butchery products sold in accordance with kashrut and halal religious law. Governments regulate ritual slaughter, primarily through legislation and administrative law. In addition, compliance with oversight of ritual slaughter is monitored by governmental agencies and, on occasion, contested in litigation.

The most controversial aspect of ritual slaughter is the legality of unstunned slaughter, where animal welfare concerns regularly clash with religious concerns, and split public opinion.

== Scope of regulations ==
In Western countries, law reaches into every stage of ritual slaughter, from the slaughtering of livestock to the sale of kosher or halal meat. In the United States, for example, courts have ruled that kosher butchers may be excluded from collective bargaining units, a Jewish beit din (court) may forbid trade with disapproved butchers, retail sellers implicitly stipulate their compliance with rabbinic courts, a state law (NY) may incorporate a rabbinical ruling on kosher labelling, and kashrut symbols may be subject to trade infringement laws.

In Jones v. Butz, the action involved "a challenge, under the Free Exercise and Establishment Clauses of the First Amendment, to the Humane Slaughter Act and in particular to the provisions relating to ritual slaughter as defined in the Act and which plaintiffs suggested involved the Government in the dietary preferences of a particular religious (e.g., Orthodox Jews) group. The court held that there is no violation of Establishment Clause because no excessive governmental entanglement and by making it possible for those who wish to eat ritually acceptable meat to slaughter the animal in accordance with the tenets of their faith, Congress neither established the tenets of that faith nor interfered with the exercise of any other."

In the United States religious slaughter is not practiced under any exemption, as is the case in several European legal codes. Instead the Humane Slaughter Act defines religious slaughter by Jews and Muslims as one of two humane methods for killing animals for food:

(a) in the case of cattle, calves, horses, mules, sheep, swine, and other livestock, all animals are rendered insensible to pain by a single blow or gunshot or an electrical, chemical or other means that is rapid and effective, before being shackled, hoisted, thrown, cast, or cut; or (b) by slaughtering in accordance with the ritual requirements of the Jewish faith or any other religious faith that prescribes a method of slaughter whereby the animal suffers loss of consciousness by anemia of the brain caused by the simultaneous and instantaneous severance of the carotid arteries with a sharp instrument and handling in connection with such slaughtering. § 1902

The kosher food industry has challenged regulations as an infringement on religious freedom.

Secular governments also have sought to restrict ritual slaughter not intended for food consumption. In the US, the most prominent such case is Church of Lukumi Babalu Aye v. City of Hialeah. In this case, the Supreme Court of the United States ruled unconstitutional a local Florida ban on Santería ritual animal sacrifice.

The issue is complicated by allegations of antisemitism and xenophobia.

Lastly, recent debate in Switzerland has been contentious, in part, because of comparisons by a prominent activist between kosher slaughter and the methods used by Nazis in concentration camps. The metaphor was borrowed from the vegetarian and Nobel Prize laureate Isaac Bashevis Singer who said "I am not a vegetarian for my own health, but for the health of the chickens" and has one of his fictional characters say, "In relation to [animals], all people are Nazis; for the animals it is an eternal Treblinka."

== Religious slaughter practice ==
=== Islamic jurisprudence ===
A 1935 fatwa by the Mufti of Delhi declared that stunning that does not kill the animal and thus is 'reversible' is allowed under Islamic law. Al-Azhar rector Muhammad el-Tayyeb el-Naggar confirmed in 1982 that stunning would not make the practice un-Islamic. Many Muslim authorities accept reversible stunning prior to the cut, such as electrostunning, or concussion with a roundheaded (mushroom-shaped) hammer. Supreme Leader of Iran ayatollah Ali Khamenei permitted pre-cut stunning. In 2014, about 85% of halal meat produced by the Muslim community in the United Kingdom was pre-stunned.

=== Jewish jurisprudence ===
According to Jewish law, slaughter of cattle and poultry is carried out with a single cut to the throat. According to ShechitaUK, '[a]ll forms of mechanical stunning, which may include asphyxiation by gas, electrocution by tongs or water or shooting with a captive bolt gun, cause pain on application and are thus prohibited by Jewish law.' According to rabbi Norman Solomon (2000), some Reform Jews regard ethics as more important than diet, and reject the very notion of kosher meat. Within the North American Conservative denomination of Judaism, there is a broad consensus of accepting meat from animals stunned before slaughter as kosher. Without exception, Orthodox Jewish communities uphold the prohibition on stunning before slaughter.

In practice, a requirement for a shohet (Jewish ritual slaughterer) is that the shohet adheres to a high level of religiosity. Any kind of prestunning for livestock to be slaughtered according to the Jewish Kosher method has not yet been accepted by orthodox Judaism. In practice, kosher slaughtering is carried out by orthodox shochtim (authorized slaughterers) because the meat produced by Conservative slaughters from the Conservative denomination would not be acceptable to orthodox practising Jews and the limited market that would accept such meat is not commercially viable.

== Historic bans (until 1945) ==
=== Asia ===
Some rulers banned all killing on their land for some period each year, including ritual slaughter. Beop of Baekje banned all kinds of killing. In 675, Emperor Tenmu, followed by Empress Genshō and Emperor Shōmu banned eating meat in Japan. Tokugawa Tsunayoshi who was Fifth General Shōgun of Edo (Japan) made animal protection laws and when he died, about 8000 criminals (including 3800 in Edo) who had been convicted of violating the law, were released (see ja:生類憐れみの令). According to the Red Annals (Deb-ther Dmar-po), Möngke Khan prohibited meat eating and killing four days each month.

After conquering Bago in 1559, King Bayinnaung prohibited the practice of halal. Halal slaughter was also forbidden by King Alaungpaya in the 18th century.

According to the White History of the Tenfold Virtuous Dharma (Arban Buyantu Nom-un Caġan Teüke), Altan Khan ordered the religious code Arban Buyantu Nom-un Cagaja prohibited human and animal sacrifice.

=== Europe until 1945 ===
In the 1880s, anti-Semites joined forces with Animal Protection Societies to campaign for anti-shechita legislation to be passed in Switzerland, Germany and Scandinavia.

In Switzerland shechitah was forbidden throughout the whole country in 1893 after having been banned in the cantons of Aargau and St. Gallen in 1867 after plebiscites, and later a ban was introduced in the whole of Switzerland after a plebiscite at Federal level. The system of voting on individual policies using referendums (plebiscites) had only recently been introduced. and the first plebiscite in Swiss history was on the subject of banning shechita. The government and all the political parties were against the ban, but the popular sentiment prevailed.

Sweden banned shechita (Jewish ritual slaughter) of cattle in 1937, and of poultry in 1989. In June, 1937, a law, the effect of which was to abolish Shehitah, was presented to the Riksdag by Karl G. Westman (Bondeförbundet, today Centre Party (Sweden)) Minister of Justice. It was passed on June 4, 1937, and went into force July 1, 1938. The law made stunning mandatory before the drawing of blood in slaughtering, but made it apply only to cattle, not to fowl and rabbits, and not to reindeer "until the King shall so decide". For violation, provision was made for fines, the money to go to the crown. Slaughter of poultry without stunning was banned in 1989.

Norway banned religious slaughter without pre-stunning in 1929.

Poland enacted mandatory stunning of animals before the drawing of blood since 1 January 1937, however by a ministerial decree an exception for ritual slaughter by religious groups has been enacted the same day. In 1938 the Polish Sejm passed a bill outlawing the exception for religious groups but it has not been accepted by the Senate and was never enacted into law.

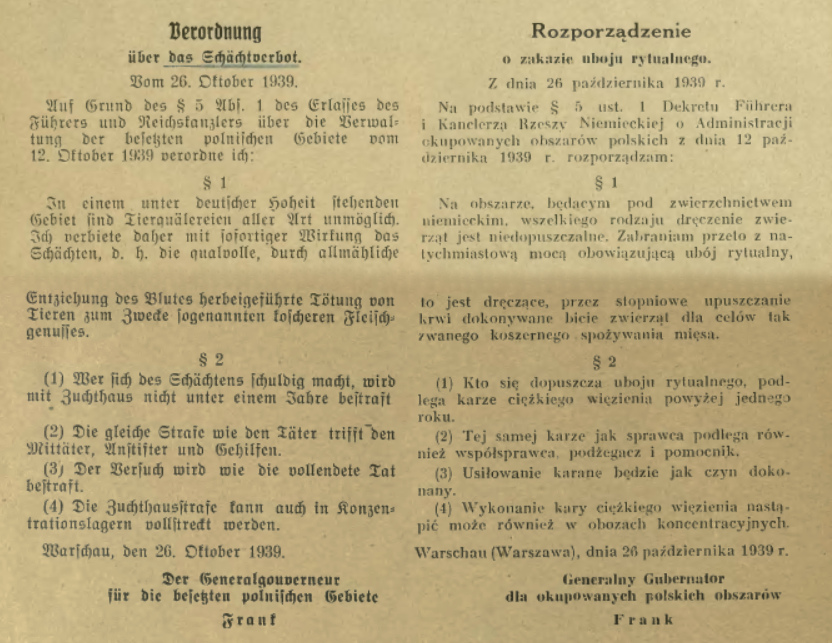
The ordinance of Governor-General of German-occupied Poland Hans Frank of October 26, 1939 banning the ritual slaughter of animals

Germany banned shechita nationwide three months after Adolf Hitler came to power in 1933. There had been a prior ban in the German state of Saxony, and the League of Nations had supported the Jewish community of Upper Silesia against Hitler in rejecting the attempts by German officials to confiscate shechita knives and ban Jewish slaughter there as had been done in the German Reich. Bans were introduced in all the countries which the Nazis occupied. The first was occupied Poland where the German Governor-General issued a decree completely outlawing ritual slaughter on October 26, 1939. Similar acts were enacted in the countries of the Axis allies: Italy and Hungary. Bans introduced by the German Third Reich and by Benito Mussolini were removed by Allied Command after the allies had won the second world war in Europe.

In Religious Freedom: The Right to Practice Shehitah, Munk, Munk and Berman documented every ban introduced in every country in Europe up to 1946, and made an analysis that claims that until the rise of Hitler in 1933, the international campaign to introduce ritual slaughter / shehitah bans had failed because the vast majority of countries where legislation had been proposed rejected the legislation realising the involvement of anti-Semites in the campaign and enacted legislation to stave off bans on Jewish and Muslim slaughter.

== Europe ==
In post-war Europe, there are three main sources of animal welfare law, namely the conventions and the European Court of Human Rights (ECHR) of the Council of Europe (CoE), the legislation and Court of Justice (CJEU) of the European Union (EU), and the national legislation of European countries, all of which (except Belarus and Russia) are member states of the Council of Europe, and 27 of which are member states of the European Union. While Council of Europe conventions and ECHR rulings only apply to Parties (that is, countries and the EU if they have signed and ratified the relevant treaties), EU legislation and CJEU rulings only apply to EU member states, and these sets of countries don't always overlap; moreover, not all Parties or EU member states may have (properly) implemented their CoE or EU obligations and commitments into national laws yet.

=== Council of Europe ===
"Each Contracting Party may authorise derogations from the provisions concerning prior stunning in the following cases:
– slaughtering in accordance with religious rituals..."

— 1979 Slaughter Convention (Council of Europe treaty)

Article 9 of the European Convention on Human Rights, which applies to all member states of the Council of Europe and came into effect in 1953, provides for a right to freedom of thought, conscience, and religion which includes the freedom to manifest a religion or belief in, inter alia, practice and observance, subject only to such restrictions as are "in accordance with law" and "necessary in a democratic society." Preliminary discussions of the Convention referred specifically to religious ritual slaughter bans. The European Court of Human Rights ruled in the 2024 case Executief van de Moslims van België and Others v. Belgium that legal requirements to stun animals, in a way that is reversible, before the cutting performed during ritual slaughter are compatible with the Convention. The court decided that there was no violation of article 9 or article 14 of the European Convention on Human Rights and that the laws were justified in trying to protect animal welfare.

The European Convention for the Protection of Animals for Slaughter (1979, revised 1991), another Council of Europe treaty, generally requires stunning before slaughter, but allows its Parties to permit exemptions for religious slaughter: "Each Contracting Party may authorise derogations from the provisions concerning prior stunning in the following cases: – slaughtering in accordance with religious rituals...."

=== European Union ===
"In order to promote animal welfare in the context of ritual slaughter, Member States may, without infringing the fundamental rights enshrined in the Charter, require a reversible stunning procedure which cannot result in the animal's death."

— 2020 ruling European Court of Justice (EU institution)

There is no EU legal requirement for meat from unstunned animals to be labelled as such, and EU-wide proposals for mandatory labelling have been strongly resisted. This leads to confusion amongst consumers, who often cannot know whether certain products are the result of unstunned ritual slaughter. The European Court of Justice has ruled in 2019 that the organic production logo of the European Union cannot be placed on meat derived from animals that have been slaughtered without prior stunning.

The European Food Safety Authority (EFSA) recommended in 2004 that "due to the serious animal welfare concerns associated with slaughter without stunning, pre-cut stunning should always be performed". The 22 June 2009 EU Slaughter Regulation, approved by the EU Agriculture Council, allowed religious slaughter without stunning to continue.

The European Court of Justice has confirmed in 2018 that ritual slaughter without stunning may take place only in an approved slaughterhouse. Moreover, on 17 December 2020 it ruled that member states of the European Union may require a reversible pre-cut stunning procedure in order to promote animal welfare.

Some European states have banned unstunned ritual slaughter, while others have not. Meat from unstunned animals can be freely exported and imported between states in the Schengen Area.

=== EU member state laws ===
Legal requirements for ritual slaughter by EU member state
State	Requirement	Since	Notes
Austria	Post-cut stunning required	2004	Animal Protection Act 2004 §32.
Belgium	Pre-cut stunning required	2018/19	Wallonia banned unstunned ritual slaughter in September 2018; Flanders followed in January 2019. As of December 2020, Brussels is still debating a ban.
Bulgaria	No stunning required		
Croatia	No stunning required		
Cyprus	No stunning required		The Veterinary Services may grant a derogation on the general requirement of stunned slaughter to a competent religious authority.
Czech Republic	No stunning required		
Denmark	Pre-cut stunning required	2014	Only stunned ritual slaughter is allowed. However, unstunned meat may be imported to Denmark, and Danish stunned meat is exported to some countries in the Middle East.
Estonia	Post-cut stunning required		Post-cut stunning is allowed.
Finland	Simultaneous stunning required	1934	Cutting and stunning must happen simultaneously during ritual slaughter. In Åland, pre-cut stunning is required.
France	No stunning required		Restrictions on ritual slaughter are permissible, but only if they do not prevent religious adherents from obtaining religiously slaughtered meat.
Germany	No stunning required	2002	Islamic unstunned slaughter was banned in 1995, but legalised again in 2002. It is illegal to export unstunned meat.
Greece	Post-cut stunning required	2017	Animals other than poultry require post-cut stunning during ritual slaughter.
Hungary	No stunning required		
Ireland	No stunning required		
Italy	No stunning required		
Latvia	Post-cut stunning required	2009	Post-cut stunning is allowed.
Lithuania	No stunning required	2015	Lithuania legalised unstunned ritual slaughter in 2015 in the midst of a trade war with Russia.
Luxembourg	No stunning required	2009	Religious exemptions to the 1995 law to stun all animals before slaughter became available in 2009.
Malta	No stunning required		
Netherlands	No stunning required	2011	Since 2011, a veterinarian must be present and since 2018, the animal must lose consciousness within 40 seconds, otherwise stunning is required.
Poland	No stunning required	2014	A 2013 ban on unstunned slaughter on animal rights grounds was overturned in 2014 on religious freedom grounds.
Portugal	No stunning required		
Romania	No stunning required		
Slovakia	Post-cut stunning required		
Slovenia	Ritual slaughter banned	2012	In 2012, Slovenia amended its Animal Welfare Act to ban all forms of ritual slaughter.
Spain	No stunning required	2007	Stunning requirements are dropped if these are "inconsistent with the rules of the respective religious rite".
Sweden	Pre-cut stunning required	1988	Only stunned slaughter is allowed; some Islamic slaughterhouses in Sweden consider this halal.

Legal requirements for ritual slaughter in Europe (current): Stunning not required Post-cut stunning required Simultaneous stunning required Pre-cut stunning required Ritual slaughter banned No data

==== Austria ====
A complete prohibition on unstunned ritual slaughter was ruled unconstitutional by the Austrian Constitutional Court on 17 December 1998, as pre-cut stunning was deemed too much of a limitation on freedom of religion and thought; however, the Court acknowledged that the freedom of religion and thought could be restricted if it violated other rights and freedoms.

Post-cut stunned slaughter was introduced as the minimum in the province of Lower Austria in 2001. The 2004 Animal Protection Act (Bundesgesetz über den Schutz der Tiere; Tierschutzgesetz – TSchG) made post-cut stunning the nationwide mandatory minimum.

==== Belgium ====
Unstunned conventional slaughter was banned in Wallonia in June 2018; unstunned ritual slaughter was banned in September 2018. Unstunned ritual slaughter was banned in Flanders in January 2019. Brussels still allows for unstunned ritual slaughter, but banned home slaughter in December 2017, and expected to debate a total ban on unstunned slaughter soon. Several Jewish and Islamic organisations challenged the Flemish ban at the Belgian Constitutional Court, which referred the matter to the European Court of Justice. On 17 December 2020, the European Court of Justice confirmed that the Flemish legal requirement of reversible stunned slaughter was not in violation of European Union law on religious freedom, and that EU member states have the right to introduce such requirements in order to promote animal welfare. In response, Brussels Minister of Animal Welfare Bernard Clerfayt stated that this ruling reinvigorated the debate on mandatory stunning in the Brussels Capital Region, and called for a 'serene discussion with all parties involved to find a good balance between animal welfare and freedom of religion.'

==== Denmark ====
In February 2014, Minister for Food, Agriculture and Fisheries Dan Jørgensen signed a regulation which banned ritual slaughter of animals without prior stunning. Prior to this, religious groups could file for an exemption to the law that required stunning if they wanted to slaughter without prior stunning, although no groups had applied for such exemption. At the time, all halal slaughter in Denmark was performed with prior stunning, while kosher slaughter (which does not allow stunning) had not been practiced in Denmark since around 2004, all kosher meat being imported. In spite of this, the Muslim and Jewish Communities in Denmark strongly opposed the decree, arguing that it constituted an infringement upon religious freedom.

==== Finland ====
Finland's law on slaughter dates from the 1930s and allows post-stunning thereby permitting kosher slaughter and providing certain legislative protection for some forms of Muslim slaughter. Dhabhiha (halal slaughter) is practised in Finland, but there are not sufficient resources for Jewish slaughter, and all kosher meat is imported. In Åland the law prohibits bleeding to death unless animals have been previously stunned or directly killed.

Paragraph 4 of the 1934 Act (enacted 14 April 1934), reads:

It is forbidden to slaughter a domestic animal in any other way, except to render the animal insensible immediately before bleeding. Whenever religious reasons so demand, let it be allowed by the Ministry of Agriculture, in such a way, that the animal is rendered insensible immediately after the arteries have been swiftly cut, but in such a case the veterinarian of the institution must be present personally to supervise the slaughtering

During 1996, the debate over the practice of shechita (Jewish religious slaughter of animals) in Finland continued. Although a motion to pass a law prohibiting shechita (on animal rights grounds) was defeated in December 1995, thereby allowing the practice to continue in Finland (on the condition that the slaughtering takes place simultaneously with a stunning blow), parties opposed to shehitah were not satisfied. The debate has spanned several years, became an election issue during the 1995 general election and often took on an unpleasant tone, as the proponents of the ban (some of whom were politicians) equated shehitah with female circumcision and mutilation.

==== France ====
Ritual slaughter is permitted, with some restrictions.

In Jewish Liturgical Association Cha'are Shalom Ve Tsedek v. France, 27 June 2000, (App No. 27417/95) the Grand Chamber of the European Court of Human Rights interpreted Article 9 of the European Convention on Human Rights in a case involving a lawsuit by Glatt kosher slaughterers against a French law recognizing a non-Glatt association (the ACIP) as having the exclusive right to conduct Jewish ritual slaughter in France. The Court stated that ritual slaughter is a practice covered by the Article 9's guarantee of the right to manifest religious observance:

It is not contested that ritual slaughter, as indeed its name indicates, constitutes a rite or "rite"...whose purpose is to provide Jews with meat from animals slaughtered in accordance with religious prescriptions, which is an essential aspect of practice of the Jewish religion...It follows that the applicant association can rely on Article 9 of the Convention with regard to the French authorities' refusal to approve it, since ritual slaughter must be considered to be covered by a right guaranteed by the Convention, namely the right to manifest one's religion in observance, within the meaning of Article 9.

The Court then clarified the scope of Article 9, holding that it applies only to restrictions which would prevent consumers from being able to obtain ritually slaughtered meat:

In the Court's opinion, there would be interference with the freedom to manifest one's religion only if the illegality of performing ritual slaughter made it impossible for ultra-orthodox Jews to eat meat from animals slaughtered in accordance with the religious prescriptions they considered applicable. But that is not the case. It is not contested that the applicant association can easily obtain supplies of "glatt" meat in Belgium. Furthermore, it is apparent from the written depositions and bailiffs' official reports produced by the interveners that a number of butcher's shops operating under the control of the ACIP make meat certified "glatt" by the Beth Din available to Jews.

Thus, under the Court of Human Rights' interpretation (not unanimous) of the European Convention on Human Rights in the Cha'are Shalom case, restrictions on ritual slaughter are permissible, but only if they do not prevent religious adherents from obtaining religiously slaughtered meat.

==== Germany ====
On 15 January 2002 the German Federal Constitutional Court held that the Basic Law for the Federal Republic of Germany provides a broader guarantee of human rights in the area of religious freedom than the European Convention on Human Rights. In an appeal by a Turkish citizen who practiced Islamic ritual slaughter, the German court struck down Germany's former ban on ritual slaughter, holding that the German Basic Law's guarantee of religious freedom prohibited the German government from applying a law requiring stunning prior to slaughter to observant Muslims who practice ritual slaughter for religious reasons, and that the Basic Law's guarantee of religious freedom applies to slaughterers as well as consumers of meat. The German court held that under Article 2.1 of the German Basic Law, religious slaughterers have a distinct fundamental right to practice a religiously recognized vocation. It also explained that merely permitting importation of ritually slaughtered meat is inadequate to protect the religious rights of individuals under Articles 4.1 and 4.2 of the German Basic Law (Constitution) because personal contact is important to ensuring compliance with religious requirements. It held that an exemption from laws that conflicted with this was therefore mandated:

It is true that the consumption of imported meat makes such renunciation [of meat-eating] dispensable; however, due to the fact that in this case, personal contact with the butcher and the confidence that goes with such contact do not exist, the consumption of imported meat is fraught with the insecurity whether the meat really complies with the commandments of Islam....Under these circumstances, an exemption from the mandatory stunning of warm-blooded animals before their blood is drained cannot be precluded if the intention connected with this exemption is to facilitate, on the one hand, the practice of a profession with a religious character, which is protected by fundamental rights, and, on the other hand, the observation of religious dietary laws by the customers of the person practicing the occupation in question. Without such exemptions, the fundamental rights of those who want to perform slaughter without stunning as their occupation would be unreasonably restricted, and the interests of the protection of animals would, without a sufficient constitutional justification, be given priority in a one-sided manner.

==== Latvia ====
Latvia legalised ritual slaughter in 2009. Halal meat products are exported to Sweden and animals are slaughtered using post-cut stunning.

==== Luxembourg ====
Luxembourg has required since at least 1995 that animals be stunned prior to being slaughtered, and previously did not provide any exception for religious slaughter. The 1995 regulation has since been repealed and replaced by one that transposes European Union Regulation (EC) No. 1099/2009 of 24 September 2009 on the protection of animals at the time of killing into Luxembourger law. Under this new regulation, there now is an exception for religious slaughter, subject to authorization by the government upon written request on the part of the religious authority.

==== Netherlands ====
Ritual slaughter is permitted, and regulated by a special convention concerning ritual slaughter. The Party for the Animals (Dutch: Partij voor de Dieren; PvdD) was voted into the Dutch Parliament's Lower House with two MPs in 2006, increased to 6 MPs in 2017. Their election program had been to introduce an effective ban on ritual slaughter: Jewish shechita and Muslim dhabiha. The bill was passed in the Lower House of the Dutch Parliament with 116 votes to 30. Debate over the matter swiftly became a focus of animosity towards the Netherlands' 1.2 million-strong Muslim community. The country's Jewish population is comparatively small at 50,000.

Following months of debate a last-minute concession was offered—the Muslim and Jewish communities would have a year to provide evidence that animals slaughtered by traditional methods do not experience greater pain than those that are stunned before they are killed.

Chief Rabbi Lord Sacks visited the Netherlands in May 2011 to lobby against the ban, arguing that pre-stunning failed in up to 10 per cent of cases and that caused more pain than the swift cutting of the throat by a razor-sharp knife. He blamed the vote on "a mischievous campaign by the animal rights lobby, based on emotive images and questionable science."

Dr. Joe Regenstein of Cornell University prepared a Preliminary Report for the Dutch government in May 2011. The Dutch Senate (Upper House) held a long debate, and voted down the bill. Ritual slaughter is to proceed as before, with a provision for post-cut stunning should the animal survive for more than 40 seconds. According to various individuals and groups, the stunned animal will be neither halal or kosher. Only the Freedom Party of Geert Wilders, the Socialist Party, and the Animal Party wanted to forbid ritual slaughter in The Netherlands.

Since 1 January 2018, a new regulation has been implemented that animals must lose consciousness within 40 seconds, otherwise stunning is required. Rumours spread that some Islamic abattoirs had started to stun animals before the cut, prompting conservative Muslims in July to raise concerns whether the meat would still be halal. The Utrecht Mosques Partnership called for a boycott of all Dutch meat during Eid al-Adha in August, forsaking the traditional sacrifice. They recommended having an animal sacrificed abroad and the meat imported until the availability of what they consider 'halal' meat within the Netherlands can be guaranteed. However, the Associations of Imams in the Netherlands (VIN) criticised the move, stressing the importance of ritual sacrifice in Islam, and saying the boycott 'violated divine law'.

==== Poland ====
Poland banned slaughter of non-stunned animals in January, 2013, thus losing to neighbouring countries, such as Lithuania, an annual half-a-billion euro export trade to Israel, Turkey, Egypt, Iran and other Muslim-majority nations. The claim was made by animal rights activists that kosher slaughter represented cruelty to animals. The legal developments were complex, involving a government amendment to a law requiring all animals to be stunned prior to slaughter. The amendment allowed an exception to protect the religious freedoms of Poland's tiny Jewish and Muslim communities. The Jewish and Muslim Lipka Tatars communities in Poland jointly protested against the ban.

After pressure from animal rights groups, the Constitutional Court quashed the amendment on the grounds that it is not permissible to amend a law so that the original intention of the law is contradicted. In December 2014, the Polish Constitutional Court overturned the ban on kosher and halal slaughter since the protection of animals "does not take priority over constitutional guarantees of religious freedom," with Judge Maria Gintowt-Jankowicz stating in her final verdict that "the constitution guarantees the freedom of religion which includes the carrying out of all activities, practices, rites and rituals which have a religious character."

In 2020, The Polish government had plans to ban the export of kosher and halal meat. They would later drop this plan.

==== Slovenia ====
In 2012, Slovenia amended its Animal Welfare Act to ban all forms of ritual slaughter. A group of Muslims requested the Constitutional Court to review the law, arguing unstunned ritual slaughter was a key part of the Islamic religion and therefore protected by the freedom of religion. However, the Court unanimously upheld the Act in 2018, stating that 'the Constitution did not allow easily preventable suffering to be inflicted on animals without a justified cause', and that this provision did 'not disproportionally interfere' with religious freedom.

==== Spain ====
Animal welfare is controlled under the provisions of the Animal Welfare Act 32/2007, of November 7th. Article 6 of the act concerns slaughter of animals, including ritual slaughter:

When the slaughter of animals is carried out according to the rites of Churches, religious denominations or communities registered in the Register of Religious Entities, and the stunning requirements are inconsistent with the rules of the respective religious rite, the competent authorities will not demand the compliance with such requirements provided that the procedure is carried out within the limits referred to in Article 3 of the Organic Law no. 7 of 5 July 1980 on Religious Freedom. In any case, the slaughter according to whatever religious rite shall be carried out under the supervision and according to the instructions of the official veterinarian. The slaughterhouse shall notify the competent authority that it will carry out this kind of slaughter in order to have it registered for this purpose, without prejudice to the authorisation provided for in the European Community legislation.

==== Sweden ====
All domestic animals must be stunned before slaughter. Ritual slaughter of cattle without stunning has been prohibited since 1937, and of poultry since 1989. Halal slaughter of stunned animals takes place in Sweden.

In the rest of Europe the legal situation of ritual slaughter differs from country to country. While some countries have introduced bans, other countries—the US, the United Kingdom, Ireland, the Netherlands—introduced legislation protecting shehitah.

=== Non-EU CoE member state laws ===
Legal requirements for ritual slaughter by non-EU CoE member state
Country	Requirement	Since	Notes
Bosnia and Herzegovina	No stunning required		Requirements that animals be stunned before slaughter do not apply to religious groups.
Iceland	Pre-cut stunning required	2013	All halal meat produced in Iceland is stunned and certified by the Muslim Association of Iceland. Unstunned ritually slaughtered meat may be imported to Iceland, stunned halal meat may be exported.
Liechtenstein	Pre-cut stunning required	2010	All animals except ritually slaughtered poultry must be stunned before slaughter.
North Macedonia	No stunning required		
Norway	Pre-cut stunning required	1929	
Switzerland	Pre-cut stunning required	1893	All animals except ritually slaughtered poultry must be stunned before slaughter. A 1978 law allows for the import of meat from unstunned slaughtered animals from other countries.
Turkey	No stunning required		
United Kingdom	No stunning required		Legality is hotly debated.

==== Norway ====
"The debate on Jewish religious slaughter in Norway first evolved in the animal protection movement in the late 1890s, but did not become a public matter until the Jews of Norway's capital Kristiania (now Oslo) were forced by the city authorities to abandon the practice of kosher slaughter (shehitah) within the city borders in 1913. From that moment and until the law prohibiting the practice on a national level was adopted by the Norwegian parliament on 12 June 1929, the debate made the headlines on several occasions in Norwegian newspapers in the interwar years. Hundreds of articles, letters and editorials discussed the case which was known as the «Schächtning-affair».1 The issue received especially much attention from the nationalist right-wing of the Agrarian movement, and the Jewish slaughter practice became subject to a massive campaign from the Agrarian press and from Agrarian party members of parliament. In its final phase during the 1920s, many of the critics were also heavily influenced by the modern anti-Semitic ideology that had evolved in Germany since the late 1870s. One of the most quoted statements from the debate was made by the Agrarian MP, and later prime minister Jens Hundseid (1883–1965) during the conclusive parliamentary session on 12 June 1929: «We have no obligation to deliver our domestic animals to the cruelties of the Jews, we have not invited the Jews to this country, and we have no obligation to provide the Jews animals to their religious orgies»."

Norway copied the Swiss campaign to ban ritual slaughter. The same arguments were presented as in the Swiss campaign and an appeal was made by the Jewish community to the Norwegian parliament not to introduce the legislation. After the ban was introduced, Norwegian Jews imported kosher meat from Sweden until it was banned there too.

In the 1890s, protests were raised in the Norwegian press against the practice of shechita. The Jewish community responded to these objections by assuring the public that the method was in fact humane. Efforts to ban shechita put sincere humane society activists in league with antisemitic individuals. Those opposing the ban included Fridtjof Nansen, but the division on the issue crossed party lines in all mainstream parties, except the Farmer's Party, which was principled in its opposition to schechita.

The Food Health regulations were controversial, especially the stunning requirement, as they would lead to a fundamental change in the meat producing market. A committee was commissioned on 11 February 1927 that consulted numerous experts and visited a slaughterhouse in Copenhagen. Its majority favoured the changes and found support in the Department of Agriculture and the parliamentary agriculture committee. Those who opposed a ban spoke of religious tolerance, and also claimed that schechita was no more inhumane than other slaughter methods. C J Hambro was one of those most appalled by the discussion, claiming that "where animal rights are protected to an exaggerated extent, it usually is done with the help of human sacrifice"

==== Switzerland ====
The Swiss banned unstunned slaughter in 1893 after a plebiscite so that a law requiring stunning prior to blood letting (exsanguination) was included in the Swiss Constitution. This required every abattoir to stun animals before slaughter, including Jewish and Islamic ones. The plebiscite had been preceded by a long anti-Semitic campaign, in which Jews were supported by Catholics, who had suffered under Otto von Bismarck in his anti-Catholic Kulturkampf. Catholic priests gave sermons encouraging their parishioners to vote against the effective ban, and the results of the referendum showed that French-speaking Cantons had voted against the ban, but that German-speaking Protestant cantons had voted for the ban.

In Switzerland, a ban on kosher slaughter has been enforced since 1897, when the people supported this measure through a referendum with clear anti-Semitic undertones. At the time, Jews had recently been granted full civil rights and some Swiss citizens feared an invasion of Jewish migrants from Eastern Europe, who they considered to be unassimilable, foreign, and unreliable. By banning the performance of a core Jewish ritual, the Swiss people found a disguised way to limit the immigration of Jews into Switzerland.

According to the US Bureau of Democracy, Human Rights and Labour "Ritual slaughter (the bleeding to death of animals that have not first been stunned) was made illegal in the country in 1893; however, a 1978 Law on the Protection of Animals explicitly allows for the importation of kosher and halal meat. Imported from France and Germany, this meat is available in the country at comparable prices. In 2003, a popular initiative to protect animal rights and prohibit the import of meat from animals bled without stunning was filed; in December 2005, however, the sponsors withdrew their initiative before it had been submitted to a national vote after Parliament adopted a revision of the Law on the Protection of Animals."

The Swiss Federation of Jewish Communities (SIG), founded in 1904, regards the 1893 ban on unstunned slaughter as antisemitic.

There was a backlash against a proposal to lift the ban in 2002. "In 2002, when the Swiss government attempted to lift the century-old ban, animal rights activists, political groups (on the left and the right), and unaffiliated citizens expressed strong opposition. They called shechita practice a "barbaric" and "sanguinary", an "archaic tradition from the time of the ghettos", and asked Jews to either become vegetarian or leave the country."

===== Proposals to extend ban to imports =====
Switzerland has considered extending the ban in order to prohibit importing kosher products. The Swiss Animal Association called for a referendum on banning kosher imports. Christopher Blocher, a cabinet minister for the Swiss People's Party, has supported calls to ban the import of kosher and halal meat. "A recent survey showed more than three-quarters of the population said they would like to see their government ban even the import of kosher meat." Erwin Kessler, president of Verein gegen Tierfabrik (Association against animal factories) who has several convictions for racial offences, including the comparison of Jewish ritual slaughter of animals with the Nazi treatment of Jews, has been campaigning vigorously for this. He's 40,000 short of the 100,000 signatures needed to trigger a referendum to completely ban kosher and halal meat entering Switzerland. Kessler has inflamed the controversy by publicly quoting vegetarian and literature Nobel Laureate Isaac Bashevis Singer comparing kosher slaughter to the methods used by Nazis in concentration camps, but denies that his motives are anti-semitic."

In June 2017, MP Matthias Aebischer (Social Democratic Party) proposed a bill to ban the import of meat from animals that have undergone ritual slaughter. The bill also included a ban on foie gras, which is controversial because it is produced by forcefeeding geese which is widely considered cruel, despite being popular amongst especially French-speaking Swiss.

==== Turkey ====
Stunning is not required in Turkey. Animal welfare organisations such as Eyes on Animals have been campaigning to raise awareness amongst slaughterhouses, religious leaders and consumers that stunning does not contravene Islamic law, and to voluntarily choose to perform or promote stunning, or buy products obtained through stunned ritual slaughter. In 2019, the large conservative sect İsmailağa publicly declared that stunning animals is halal, and as of July 2020, the Turkish Ministry of Agriculture was considering the introduction of a law that would mandate the painless killing of animals. Some companies have already started stunning animals because it's quicker, safer and cleaner, while the public is slowly accepting meat from stunned animals as halal.

==== United Kingdom ====
Unstunned religious slaughter is legal in the UK. However, its legality is hotly debated by various religious and political groups and individuals. Both Muslims and non-Muslims, Jews and non-Jews are divided over the question whether meat from stunned animals is to be considered halal or kosher, and thus whether a ban on unstunned slaughter would or would not constitute a violation of the religious freedom of those Jews and Muslims who claim to have a right to consume meat from unstunned animals. Meanwhile, some animal welfare activists and groups argue that slaughter should be banned entirely, regardless of alleged justification.

In 2003, the Farm Animal Welfare Council (FAWC), which advises the British government on how to avoid cruelty to livestock, stated the way Jewish Kosher and Muslim Halal meat is produced causes severe suffering to animals, and recommend the British government to ban Jewish and Muslim ritual slaughter (shechita and dhabihah). The British government rejected FAWC's advice. This elicited responses from shechita uk, and from Dr S. D. Rosen This is a continuation of a public debate that dates back to the founding or the Animal Protection Societies in the 1890s. S. D. Rosen's conclusion in a Viewpoint article in The Veterinary Record is that "Shechita (kosher slaughter) is a painless and humane method of animal slaughter".

Food Standards Agency figures from 2012 showed that more than 80% of animals are stunned before slaughter for halal meat in the UK.

The debate in the UK resurfaced in spring 2014 after Denmark prohibited unstunned slaughter in February that year. It began with a 6 March 2014 article of three page long in The Times by the British Veterinary Association's president John Blackwell, who claimed that in ritual slaughter the animal must be alive when its throat is cut and die from loss of blood, annually causing more than 600,000 animals in Britain unnecessary suffering. Vice-president Jonathan Arkush of the Board of Deputies of British Jews confronted Blackwell the same day on The Today Programme by saying that "animals that are killed for the Jewish and Muslim markets do not bleed to death." He claimed that cutting an animal's throat "instantly" renders an animal "insensible to pain and unconscious", while on the other hand "pre-stunning fails to stun in between 9 and 31% of cases, depending on which animal welfare charity you go to", attributing the 9% figure to the RSPCA. Blackwell retorted that there is strong scientific evidence that, depending on the species, the animal remains conscious after the throat cut for an average of 7 seconds in sheep to up to 2 minutes in cattle, which is "unacceptable from a welfare point of view". Some Muslim and Jewish commentators accused Blackwell and his supporters of anti-Muslim or anti-Semitic prejudice, but Blackwell insisted that he respected religious beliefs and that "the Danish unilateral banning [was done] purely for animal welfare reasons, which is right". Numerous animal welfare societies backed Blackwell's position. National Secular Society campaigner Stephen Evans argued that the scientific consensus was clear that stunning was better for animal welfare, and that it was "therefore both reasonable and appropriate to suggest that, unless religious communities can agree on more humane slaughter methods, their right to religious freedom should, in this instance, be limited in the interests of animal welfare."

On the day the controversy began on 6 April 2014, it was reported that about 80 to 85% of halal meat produced by the Muslim community in the United Kingdom was pre-stunned. However, the percentage of unstunned slaughtered animals within the British halal meat industry grew by around 60% in the ten months after this controversy began, following a Muslim campaign to change the practice.

== Other countries ==
In the rest of Europe the legal situation of ritual slaughter differs from country to country. While some countries have introduced bans, other countries—the US, the United Kingdom, Ireland, the Netherlands—introduced legislation protecting shehitah.

Legal requirements for ritual slaughter by country
Country	Requirement	Since	Notes
Australia	Pre-cut stunning required		Except for 4 slaughterhouses which may slaughter sheep unstunned and cattle post-cut, all animals in Australia must be stunned.
Canada	No stunning required		
New Zealand	Pre-cut stunning required	2018	According to the Commercial Slaughter Code of Welfare, updated on 1 October 2018, all religious slaughter in New Zealand requires pre-cut stunning, with the exception of Jewish (kosher) slaughter of poultry.
United States	No stunning required	1958	
Uruguay	No stunning required		

=== Canada ===
Unstunned ritual slaughter is legal in Canada, provided that the food animals do not otherwise experience any other 'avoidable suffering'. According to the Safe Food for Canadians Regulations (latest revision enacted in June 2019), section 141, any licensed slaughterer must stun food animals either by concussion (a), electric shock (b) or gassing (c); however, section 144 exempts licensed ritual slaughterers from the obligation of section 141 to first stun food animals before cutting their throats in order 'to comply with Judaic or Islamic law'.

=== India ===
The 1960 Prevention of Cruelty to Animals Act is the legal basis of animal protection in India. Provision 11 states that it is illegal for 'any person... [to treat] any animal so as to subject it to unnecessary pain or suffering or causes, or being the owner permits, any animal to be so treated', and that such mistreatment is punishable with fines or prison sentences. However, it also states that this does not apply 'to the preparation for destruction of any animal as food for mankind unless such destruction or preparation was accompanied by the infliction of unnecessary pain or suffering'. Moreover, provision 28 states 'Nothing contained in this Act shall render it an offence to kill any animal in a manner required by the religion of any community.' theoretically leaving open the option of unstunned ritual slaughter. On the other hand, stunning is required for animal slaughterhouses according to provision 6 of the Prevention of Cruelty to Animals (Slaughter House) Rules, 2001, and provision 3 states that slaughter is only permitted in recognised or licensed slaughterhouses. The Food Safety and Standards (Licensing and Registration of Food Businesses) Regulation, 2011 provides more precise stipulations surrounding the welfare of animals during the slaughter process, including that 'Animals are slaughtered by being first stunned and then exsanguinated (bled out). (...) Stunning before slaughter should be mandatory.' It further stipulates which three methods are legal (CO_{2} asphyxiation, mechanical concussion (gunshot or captive bolt pistol), and electronarcosis), the conditions in which these should be performed (such as separate spaces out of sight of other animals, with the proper equipment and the requirement that 'all operators involved are well trained and have a positive attitude towards the welfare of animals'), and explains why these are conducive to animal welfare. The regulation does not mention any exceptions or exemptions for religious or ritual slaughter.

According to The Times of India, as of 2012, most abbatoirs in India employed electronarcosis at 70 volts to render animals unconscious before slaughter. As for unstunned ritual slaughter, scientific, religious and popular opinion remains divided on the question whether the dhabihah method (generally preferred by Muslims) or the jhatka method (generally preferred by Sikhs) leads to less pain and stress and a quicker death for the animal in question. Indian Muslim scholars also disagree whether meat from animals that are stunned prior to ritual slaughter is to be considered halal, with some saying it is, and others saying it is not.

=== New Zealand ===
In May 2010, Minister of Agriculture David Carter issued a ban on kosher slaughter, rejecting the recommendations of his advisors. At that time, halal slaughterhouses were already required to stun their animals prior to killing. Carter held shares in a firm which exports meat and prior to instituting the ban he met senior managers of the firm who wanted a ban on kosher slaughter to reduce their competition. In November 2010, the ban on kosher slaughter of chickens was overturned, but the ban on kosher slaughter of beef was still in effect and kosher beef had to be imported from Australia. In June 2011 the World Jewish Congress adopted a resolution calling on the New Zealand Government to abrogate its ban on kosher slaughter. According to the Commercial Slaughter Code of Welfare, updated on 1 October 2018, all religious slaughter in New Zealand requires pre-cut stunning, with the exception of Jewish (kosher) slaughter of poultry.

=== United States ===
The United States is one of the countries that has legislation for protection of shechita (Jewish) and dhabihah (Muslim) ritual slaughter. The Humane Slaughter Act defines ritual slaughter as one of two humane methods of slaughter.

Since 1958 the United States has prohibited the shackling and hoisting of cattle without stunning them first.

In Church of Lukumi Babalu Aye v. City of Hialeah 508 U.S. 520 (1993), the United States Supreme Court struck down a ban imposed by the City of Hialeah, Florida, on Santería religious animal sacrifices practiced by the Church as contravening the religious freedoms guaranteed by the Free Exercise Clause of the Constitution of the United States. While the City of Hialeah claimed that its ban on ritual slaughter "not for the primary purpose of food consumption" was motivated by concerns for animal welfare and public health, the Supreme Court held that ample evidence showed that it was in fact motivated by animosity to the Santería religion and a desire to suppress it:

That the ordinances were enacted "'because of,' not merely 'in spite of'", their suppression of Santería religious practice is revealed by the events preceding enactment of the ordinances. The minutes and taped excerpts of the 9 June session, both of which are in the record, evidence significant hostility exhibited by residents, members of the city council, and other city officials toward the Santería religion and its practice of animal sacrifice. The public crowd that attended the 9 June meetings interrupted statements by council members critical of Santería with cheers and the brief comments of Pichardo with taunts. When Councilman Martinez, a supporter of the ordinances, stated that in pre-revolution Cuba "people were put in jail for practicing this religion", the audience applauded. Other statements by members of the city council were in a similar vein. For example, Councilman Martinez, after noting his belief that Santería was outlawed in Cuba, questioned, "if we could not practice this [religion] in our homeland [Cuba], why bring it to this country?" Councilman Cardoso said that Santería devotees at the Church "are in violation of everything this country stands for." Various Hialeah city officials made comparable comments. The chaplain of the Hialeah Police Department told the city council that Santería was a sin, "foolishness", "an abomination to the Lord", and the worship of "demons." He advised the city council that "We need to be helping people and sharing with them the truth that is found in Jesus Christ." He concluded: "I would exhort you . . . not to permit this Church to exist." The city attorney commented that Resolution 87-66 indicated that "This community will not tolerate religious practices which are abhorrent to its citizens...." Similar comments were made by the deputy city attorney. This history discloses the object of the ordinances to target animal sacrifice by Santería worshippers because of its religious motivation. In sum, the neutrality inquiry leads to one conclusion: The ordinances had as their object the suppression of religion. The pattern we have recited discloses animosity to Santería adherents and their religious practices; the ordinances by their own terms target this religious exercise; the texts of the ordinances were gerrymandered with care to proscribe religious killings of animals but to exclude almost all secular killings; and the ordinances suppress much more religious conduct than is necessary in order to achieve the legitimate ends asserted in their defense. These ordinances are not neutral, and the court below committed clear error in failing to reach this conclusion

The Court also found that the city's proffered reasons for its ban simply did not explain or justify it.

Respondent claims that [the ordinances] advance two interests: protecting the public health and preventing cruelty to animals. The ordinances are underinclusive for those ends. They fail to prohibit non religious conduct that endangers these interests in a similar or greater degree than Santería sacrifice does. The underinclusion is substantial, not inconsequential. Despite the city's proffered interest in preventing cruelty to animals, the ordinances are drafted with care to forbid few killings but those occasioned by religious sacrifice. Many types of animal deaths or kills for nonreligious reasons are either not prohibited or approved by express provision.

Temple Grandin, who is both an animal welfare activist and the leading American designer of commercial slaughterhouses, has outlined techniques for humane ritual slaughter. She considers shackling and hoisting of animals for slaughter to be inhumane, and has developed alternative approaches usable in production plants. Grandin has coordinated this with the Committee on Jewish Law and Standards of the Conservative movement in the United States, and in 2000 the Committee voted to accept her approach, ruling that "Now that kosher, humane slaughter using upright pens is both possible and widespread, we find shackling and hoisting to be a violation of Jewish laws forbidding cruelty to animals and requiring that we avoid unnecessary dangers to human life. As the CJLS, then, we rule that shackling and hoisting should be stopped."

In an investigation by People for the Ethical Treatment of Animals, undercover video was obtained of kosher slaughtering practices at a major kosher slaughterhouse run by Agriprocessors in Postville, Iowa. The methods used there involved clamping the animals into a box which is then inverted for slaughter, followed by partial dismemberment of the animal before it was dead. Those methods have been condemned as unnecessarily cruel by PETA and others, including Grandin and the Committee on Jewish Law and Standards, but are endorsed by the Orthodox Union, which supervises the slaughterhouse. An investigation by the USDA resulted in some minor operational changes. A lawsuit under Iowa law is pending. Grandin's comment was "I thought it was the most disgusting thing I'd ever seen. I couldn't believe it. I've been in at least 30 other kosher slaughter plants, and I had never ever seen that kind of procedure done before. ... I've seen kosher slaughter really done right, so the problem here is not kosher slaughter. The problem here is a plant that is doing everything wrong they can do wrong". In 2006 the Orthodox Union, Temple Grandin and Agriprocessors had reportedly resolved their problems. In 2008, though, Grandin reported that Agriprocessors had again become "sloppy" in their slaughter operation and was "in the bottom 10%" of slaughterhouses.

Agriprocessors faced accusations of mistreatment of cattle, pollution, and a series of alleged violations of labour law. In May 2008, the U.S. Immigration and Customs Enforcement (ICE) staged a raid of the plant, and arrested nearly 400 illegal immigrant workers. Agriprocessors plants stopped operating in October 2008, and the firm filed for bankruptcy on 5 November of the same year. Sholom Rubashkin as the highest ranking day-to-day corporate officer was charged with federal financial fraud and sentenced to 27 years in prison in June 2010.

The Agriprocessors plant was bought at auction in July 2009 by SHF Industries and has resumed production under the new name Agri Star.

== See also ==
- Shechita, Jewish method of ritual slaughter
- Dhabihah, Islamic method of ritual slaughter
- Jhatka, Hindu and Sikh method of animal slaughter
- Animal sacrifice
- Animal welfare
- DIALREL, Dialogue on Religious Slaughter: an EU project
