= DIALREL =

DIALREL was a 2006–2010 project examining legal aspects of ritual slaughter within the European Union. Its full title was Religious slaughter: improving knowledge and expertise through dialogue and debate on issues of welfare, legislation and socio-economic aspects. DIALREL was intended as a stakeholder engagement and intercultural dialogue involving advocates of Jewish and Muslim ritual slaughter (shechita and dhabihah), opponents from the animal rights movement, and the meat industry. Institutions and experts from Australia, Belgium, Germany, Spain, France, the United Kingdom, Israel, Italy, the Netherlands, Norway and Turkey contributed to the project. The final report was completed in 2010 and was submitted to the European Commission. The DIALREL document Report on good and adverse practices - Animal welfare concerns in relation to slaughter practices from the viewpoint of veterinary sciences was criticised by Joe Regenstein, Professor of Food Science at Cornell University, while it was still a work in progress.
