= Prohibitions in Sikhism =

List of banned practices in Sikhism

Adherents of Sikhism follow a number of prohibitions. These are not religious mandates as Sikhism suggests, not prohibits, but rather are mandates by social norm. As with any followers of any faith or group, adherence varies by each individual.

== Prohibitions ==
These prohibitions are strictly followed by initiated Khalsa Sikhs who have undergone initiation. While the Sikh gurus did not enforce religion and did not believe in forcing people to follow any particular religion in general, the Sikh community does encourage all people to become better individuals by following the Guru's Advice (Gurmatta), as opposed to living life without the Guru's code of disciple (Man-mat):

4 major transgressions:

- Hair removal – Hair cutting, trimming, removing, shaving, plucking, threading, dyeing, or any other alteration from any body part is strictly forbidden.
- Eating Kutha meat, the meat of an animal whose slaughter is accompanied by a religious ritual, such as the recitation of a prayer, as required by Muslim and Jewish law. This is the absolute minimum required by all initiated Sikhs. Although lacto vegetarianism is practiced and recommended by some Sikhs, many Sikhs refrain from eating non-vegetarian food, and believe all should follow this diet. This is due to various social, cultural, political, and familial aspects. As such, there has always been major disagreement among Sikhs over the issue of eating non-vegetarian food. Sikhs following the Rehat (Code of Conduct) of the Damdami Taksal & Akhand Kirtani Jatha also subscribe to this view. The Akali Nihangs have traditionally eaten meat and are famous for performing Jhatka. Thus, there is a wide range of views that exist on the issue of a proper "Sikh diet" in the Panth. Nonetheless, all Sikhs agree with the minimum consensus that meat slaughtered via the Muslim (Halal), Jewish (Shechita) methods or any other religiously slaughtered way, is strictly against Sikh principles. The Akal Takht represents the final authority on controversial issues concerning the Sikh Panth (community or collective). The Hukamnama (edict or clarification), issued by Akal Takht Jathedar Sadhu Singh Bhaura dated February 15, 1980, states that eating meat does not go against the code of conduct of the Sikhs. Amritdhari Sikhs can eat meat as long as it is Jhatka meat.
- Adultery: Cohabiting with a person other than one's spouse (sexual relations with anyone who you are not married to- originally a prohibition on sexual intercourse with Muslim women, an injunction was made by Guru Gobind Singh not to seize them during warfare as sexual contact with them was seen as polluting. Kahn Singh Nabha of the Singh Sabha Movement had later inferred that the Guru's command was construed as a prohibition on intercourse with a woman other than one's wife.)
- Intoxicants – A Sikh must not take hemp (cannabis), opium, liquor, tobacco, cocaine, narcotics, etc. In short, any intoxicant is not allowed. Cannabis is generally prohibited, but ritually consumed in edible form by some Sikhs. Some Sikh groups, like the Damdami Taksal, are even opposed to drinking caffeine in Indian tea. Indian tea is almost always served in Sikh gurudwaras around the world. Some Akali Nihang groups consume cannabis-containing shaheedi degh (ਭੰਗ), purportedly to help in meditation.Sūkha parshaad (ਸੁੱਖਾ ਪ੍ਰਰਸਾਦ), "Dry-sweet", is the term Akali Nihangs use to refer to it. It was traditionally crushed and consumed as a liquid, especially during festivals like Hola Mohalla. It is never smoked, as this practice is forbidden in Sikhism. In 2001, Jathedar Santa Singh, the leader of Budha Dal, along with 20 chiefs of Nihang sects, refused to accept the ban on consumption of shaheedi degh by the apex Sikh clergy of Akal Takht - in order to preserve their traditional practices. According to a recent BBC article, "Traditionally they also drank shaheedi degh, an infusion of cannabis, to become closer with God". Baba Santa Singh was excommunicated and replaced with Baba Balbir Singh, who agreed to shun the consumption of bhang.

Other mentioned practices to be avoided, as per the Sikh Rehat Maryada:

- Piercing of the nose or ears for wearing ornaments is forbidden for Sikh men and women.
- Female infanticide: A Sikh should not kill his daughter; nor should he maintain any relationship with a killer of daughter.
- A Sikh shall not steal, form dubious associations or engage in gambling.
- It is not proper for a Sikh woman to wear a veil that covers the face or have the face hidden.
- Sikhs cannot wear any token of other faiths. Sikhs must not have their head bare or wear caps. They also cannot wear any ornaments piercing through any part of the body.
- Hereditary priestly class – Sikhism does not have priests, as they were abolished by Guru Gobind Singh (the 10th Guru of Sikhism). The only position he left was a Granthi to look after the Guru Granth Sahib; any Sikh is free to become Granthi or read from the Guru Granth Sahib.
- Blind spirituality: Idolatry, superstitions, and rituals should not be observed or followed, including pilgrimages, fasting, and ritual purification; circumcision; ancestor worship; grave worship; and compulsory wearing of the veil for women. Observation of the five Ks, however, is not considered blind superstition, as they are intended to help Sikhs in their everyday life.
- Material obsession: Obsession with material wealth is not encouraged in Sikhism.
- Sacrifice of creatures: Animal sacrifice to celebrate holy occasions are forbidden.
- Non-family-oriented living: Sikhs are discouraged from living as a recluse, beggar, yogi/yogini, monastic (monk/nun), or celibate.
- Worthless talk: Bragging, gossip, lying, slander, "backstabbing," et cetera, are not permitted. The Guru Granth Sahib tells the Sikh, "your mouth has not stopped slandering and gossiping about others. Your service is useless and fruitless."

== See also ==
- Rehat
- Diet in Sikhism
- Cannabis and Sikhism
