= Wilhelm Schulze =

German veterinary academic (1920–2002)

Wilhelm Schulze (10 December 1920, Leipzig – 30 December 2002) was a German professor of veterinary medicine and director of the University of Veterinary Medicine Hanover (1966–68, 1978–80 and 1980-81) who specialized in pigs.

Schulze studied veterinary medicine at Leipzig University and at Hanover University, and became a professor (1950–56) and dean (1952–55) in Leipzig. In 1957 he was appointed a professor in Hanover and established a highly regarded clinic specializing in pigs.

In 1968 he was a founder of the International Pig Veterinary Society (IPVS). His dedication to his favoured species earned him the nickname "Pigs-Schulze" ("Schweine-Schulze") among students, colleagues and vets.

Schulze was awarded honorary degrees of the Free University of Berlin, the University of Veterinary Medicine Vienna, the University of Warsaw and Leipzig University.

On August 24, 2006, the university decided to posthumously name a prize after him.

== Experiments ==
Between 1974 and 1978 Schulze and his colleagues carried out a study at the University of Veterinary Medicine Hanover. The study, published as ‘Attempts to Objectify Pain and Consciousness in Conventional (captive bolt pistol stunning) and Ritual (knife) Methods of Slaughtering Sheep and Calves' is reported on Islamic websites to have concluded that "the Islamic way of slaughtering is the most humane method of slaughter and that captive bolt stunning, practiced in the West, causes severe pain to the animal".

However, recent studies have countered the Schulze study, which is dated and relied on older EEG measurement techniques. Dr. Schulze himself also warned in his report that the stunning technique may not have functioned properly.
