= Sadhu Singh Bhaura =

Jathedar of the Akal Takht
- In office 1964–1980
- Preceded by: Partap Singh
- Succeeded by: Kirpal Singh (Acting)

Personal details
- Born: Sadhu Singh Saini; 6 June 1905 Lyallpur, Panjab (present day Pakistan)
- Died: 7 March 1984 (aged 78) Jalandhar, Panjab
- Party: Shiromani Akali Dal
- Education: Khalsa High School, Lyallpur; Shahid Sikh Missionary College, Amritsar

Sadhu Singh Bhaura (Punjabi: ਸਾਧੂ ਸਿੰਘ ਭੌਰਾ) (6 June 1905 – 7 March 1984) was a Sikh missionary who served as the 21st Jathedar of the Akal Takht from 1964 to 1980.

== Family background and early life ==
Sadhu Singh Saini was born on 6 June 1905, at Chakk No. 7, a village in Saini Bar region of Lyallpur district (now in Pakistan). His father was Bhai Ran Singh and mother Mai Atam Kaur. There were about 15 exclusively Saini villages in canal settlement and all of them had relocated there from Doaba and Gurdaspur region. The villages were named as Chakks and each Chakk had number allotted to them in official records, though some of them were named after predominant clan names or village head, examples being Chakk Naura-Bhaura and Chak Bhola. Chaudhari Bhola Ram Saini of Chakk 178 was the Zaildar in Lyallpur (now Faisalabad) district of British Punjab. During the partition of Punjab, his family migrated from the Saini Bar settlement of Lyallpur to east Punjab. He was highly educated and he could speak and write 7 languages, namely Hindi, English, Urdu, French, Arbi and Punjabi. He always encouraged everyone to do the highest level of education. He loved music as well and got his eldest daughter to master in Sitar from Lucknow university. His youngest born Dr. Balbir Singh Bhaura who is an eye surgeon in Jalandhar presently, runs a free eye camp every year on the death anniversary of his father.

== Political background ==
After matriculating from Khalsa High School, Lyallpur (where Master Tara Singh, later a leading figure in Sikh politics, was the headmaster), he joined police service and served at Quetta from 1923 to 1925 before resigning to take part in the Akali agitation for Gurdwara reform. From 1926 to 1928, he studied at the Shahid Sikh Missionary College, Amritsar, to train as a missionary. From 1928 to 1964, he headed the Sikh preaching centres at Aligarh and Hapur, in Uttar Pradesh, where he is said to have initiated nearly half a million persons according to Sikh rites, among them mostly Vanjara Sikhs of Uttar Pradesh and Rajasthan. He was a member of the executive committee of the Shiromani Akali Dal from 1955 to 1960 and took part in several of the political agitations launched by the party. He was Jathedar of Takhat Sri Kesgarh, Anandpur Sahib, from 1961 to 1964.

== Elevation as Jathedar of Akal Takht ==
In 1964, Sadhu Singh Bhaura was elevated to the position of Jathedar of Sri Akal Takht, the highest seat of religious authority and legislation for the Sikhs. He attracted wide public notice when, on 10 June 1978, he issued a hukamnama or edict calling upon all Sikhs to boycott socially the neoNirankari sect. In 1980, Jathedar Sadhu Singh Bhaura, in an effort to avert a vertical split in the Akali Dal, formed a seven member committee of senior party leaders to function as collegiate executive, but soon after himself resigned on health grounds and retired to live with his sons in Jalandhar where he died on 7 March 1984.
