= Meat consumption among Sikhs =

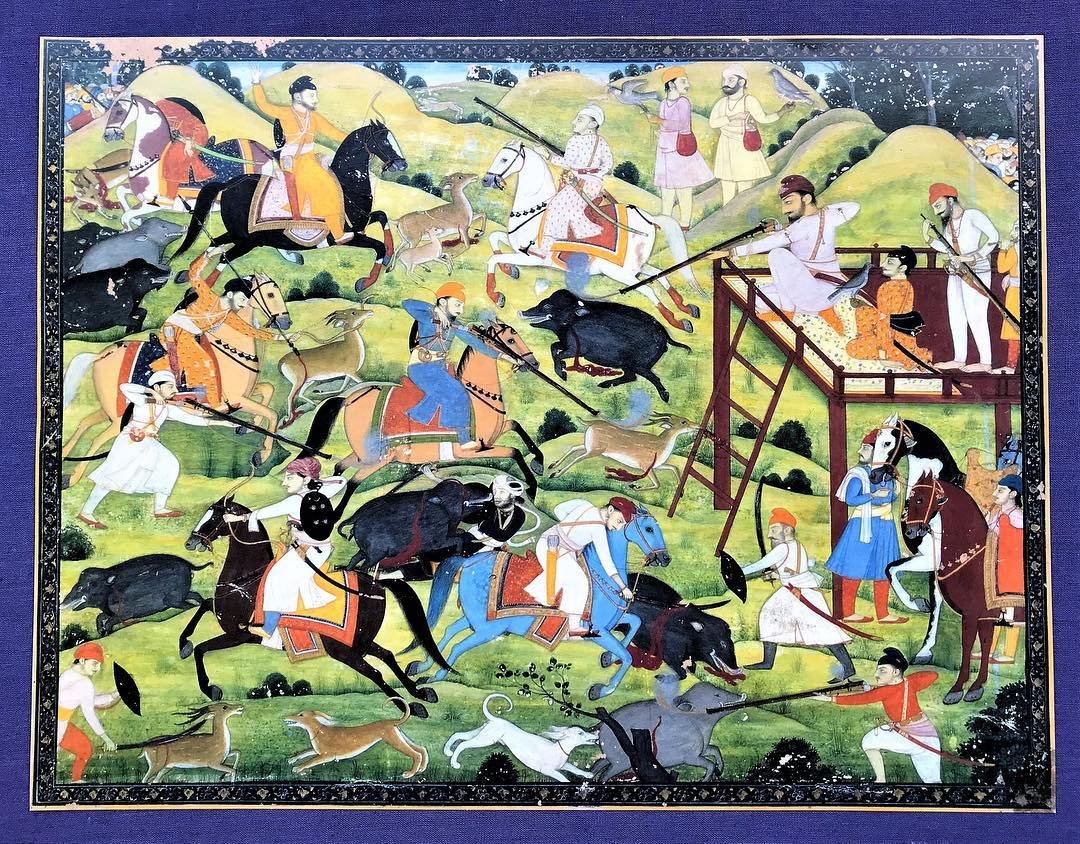
Scene of Sikhs hunting wild game, c.1820

Eating meat among Nihang Sikhs employs technique of Jhatka is practiced by sects within Sikhism when consuming meat that is either hunted or farmed. This historical method of meat consumption is popular among Nihangs and Hazuri Sikhs who eat goats on the festivals throughout the year and distribute it as Mahaprashad among the rest of the Sikhs as part of Langar.

== Debate within community ==
There exists a debate within this community whether or not meat consumption is part of Gurmat, i.e., within scriptural sanction of Sikh teachings. Most scholars say that these practices are misunderstood and do not equate it with sacrificial slaughter found in some other religions. There are other Sikhs who have an ancestral history of conversion into the Sikh faith from certain sects within Hinduism in which meat consumption is banned, and so they continue these practices as Sikhs.

=== Militant bans ===
In early 1987 Kharkus issued a moral code banning the sale and consumption of meat. The ban led to much of Punjab being without meat. Those who continued to sell or eat meat risked death and commonly would have their businesses destroyed and be killed. One survey found that there were no meat or tobacco shops between Amritsar and Phagwara. In the peak of the militancy most of Punjab was meatless. Famous restaurants that served meat had removed it from their menu and denied ever serving it. The ban was popular among rural Sikhs. Kharkus justified the ban by saying, "No avatars, Hindu or Sikh, ever did these things. To eat meat is the job of rakshasas (demons) and we don't want people to become rakshasas."

== See also ==
- Diet in Sikhism
- Jhatka
- Rehat

== Bibliography ==
- In the Master's Presence: The Sikh's of Hazoor Sahib, Nidar Singh Nihang, Parmjit Singh, Kashi House, 2008
