= Akhand Kirtani Jatha =

Sikh group

Founder
- Randhir Singh

Religions
- Sikhism

Website
- https://www.akj.org/

The Akhand Kirtani Jatha, alternatively romanized as the Akhand Keertanee Jathaa and abbreviated as AKJ, is a jatha (collective group) and sect of Sikhism dedicated to the Sikh lifestyle. The Jatha follows a strict discipline in keeping the Rehat of Guru Gobind Singh. They also enjoy an active style of Keertan recited by Sikhs in a collective manner in front of Guru Granth Sahib. This style of Keertan is relatively simple, and the entire congregation devotionally participates in singing along.

The Jatha's purpose is to provide Sikhs around the world with Sangat (companionship with enlightened souls), just like any other Jatha or group within the greater Khalsa Panth. The Jatha organizes Kirtan Smagams in cities around the world.

Randhir Singh embodied this lifestyle of strict personal discipline. He wrote many articles on Gurbani and the Sikh lifestyle. He was a dedicated Gursikh who fought injustice and always remained in Chardi Kala (high spirits).

== History ==
The Jatha (group) was started in the late 1800s, when Mata Gulab Kaur, a spiritually enlightened Gursikh woman asked Bhai Randhir Singh to re-invigorate the Khalsa Panth with Kirtan.

=== Randhir Singh ===
Randhir Singh

Randhir Singh (1878–1961) was from Ludhiana. He opposed the British rule and was imprisoned by the British authorities in 1914 till 1931. Bhai Randhir Singh was given the title of "Bhai Sahib" and the suffix "Ji" from the Panth as he was honoured by all the 4 "Takhts" (5th Takhat was ordained later on) or supreme centres for Sikhs for committing his life for the sacrifice of the Panth and always propagating the true message of Gurmat and inspiring people to take Amrit. Bhai Randhir Singh and Bhai Veer Singh were the only Sikhs to receive this title in the 20th century.

Bhai Sahib Randhir Singh ji was very prominent in the Panthik arena. There was wide recognition of his high Jeevan and Panthik Kurbani. Many of the jatha went to jail in the anti – British movement, and suffered a lot of torture. Bhai Sahib and Baba Attar Singh with many other Gursikhs had brought a lot of change in the Panth via the Gurdwara Sudhaar Movement. They worked under the banner of the Panch Khalsa Divan.

=== Akhand Kirtani Jatha (AKJ) ===
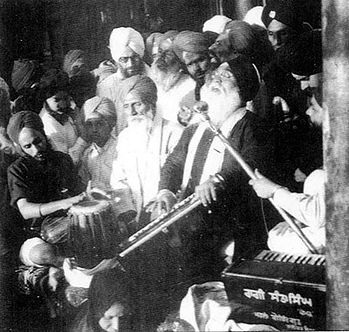
Photograph of Bhai Randhir Singh, founder of the Akhand Kirtani Jatha, performing kirtan with followers

For a long time, the Jatha did not have an official name. In the past, it was often referred to as the "Waheguru Singhs". In one such text, this was because people would say that everywhere these Gursikhs went, they would walk, talk, work, sleep, with Waheguru resounding around them. Other names for the Jatha have included the Nirban Kirtani Jatha and "Bhai Randhir Singh da Jatha".

The name AKJ only became common when Randhir Singh started doing Kirtan in all of the historical Gurdwaras. It was when Bhai Sahib started doing his marathon non-stop kirtan sessions that the name Akhand Kirtani Jatha (non-stop kirtan group) became prominent and was used often by the SGPC officials and the historical Gurdwaras where they performed Kirtan. This was how the name Akhand Kirtani Jatha came into existence. Bhai Sahib never named the Jatha and only referred to it as ‘the Jatha’, a name commonly used in India, which means a group. The name was started by Parbandaks and managers of the Gurdwaras; later it got registered in the 1970s, as was the case with most panthic groups. Today it is a worldwide organization which spreads the message of Shabad Guru, and considers itself a part of the Khalsa Panth and not a separate entity.

== Beliefs ==
AKJ follows the rules (Panthic Rehit Maryada) set by SGPC. The Jatha fully align itself with Akal Takht and the Khalsa Panth. The Jatha views itself as being completely under the umbrella of Akal Takht and the Khalsa Panth.

The four transgressions, which must be avoided are:

(1) Dishonouring the hair,

(2) Eating Kutha meat,

(3) Intimate relationship with a person other than one’s spouse, and

(4) Using tobacco (i.e. intoxicants).

In addition to the Sikh Rehit Maryada, AKJ follows a stricter form of rehit.

=== Nitnem Banis ===
AKJ follows the Nitnem maryada followed by the Sikh Panth. The 5 Banis recited every morning are the same Banis that are recited when preparing Amrit during Amrit ceremony. On 28 April 1985, the Akal Takaht issued a Hukamnama which ordered the SGPC to make the appropriate amendment in the Sikh Rehat Maryada, which reflects that the morning Nitnem is 5 Banis. A Gursikh learns from the Amrit Sanchar that the Banis being read there should be read every day so that the internal Amrit is experienced every day. The Nitnem banis read every day by Gursikhs in AKJ are the same Nitnem Banis prescribed by Sri Akal Takhat Sahib:

1. Japji Sahib
2. Jaap Sahib
3. Tav Prasad Savaiye
4. Chaupai Sahib
5. Anand Sahib
6. Rehraas Sahib
7. Kirtan Sohila

In addition to the following banis, Sikhs try to add as many banis as possible to their daily rehit.

=== Sarbloh Bibek ===
The Akhand Kirtani Jatha follows Sarbloh Bibek, which involves eating from iron bowls and iron plates only. Another key aspect to maintaining Sarbloh Bibek is that Sikhs must only eat food prepared by other Amritdhari (baptized) Sikhs. Amritdhari Sikhs are also not to eat Jootha food (previously eaten food) from non-Amritdharis.

=== Vegetarianism (egg-free) ===
Eating "Kuttha" meat is prohibited in Sikh Rehit Maryada. The Sikh Rehat Maryada and some Sikh scholars define Kutthaa as meat "slaughtered in the Muslim way" (Halaal meat). The Jatha believes that Kutthaa means "killed meat" (i.e. killed in any way). Thus, the code of vegetarianism is followed by Akhand Kirtani Jatha.

=== Keski as one of the 5Ks ===
According to the Panthic Sikh Rehit Maryada, published by the SGPC, the five K’s are:

I. The Keshas (unshorn hair),

II. The Kirpan {sheathed sword} (The length of the sword to be worn is not prescribed, although Damdami Taksaal mentions a minimum of 9 inch-Kirpan),

III. The Kachhehra (The Kachhehra (drawers like garment) may be made from any cloth, but its legs should not reach down to below the shins.),

IV. The Kanga (comb),

V. The Karha {iron bracelet} (The Karha should be of pure iron (also known as Sarabloh, or wrought iron).)

The Jatha, believes Keski is a kakkaar, not Kesh. They base this on references in the historical text of "Guru Kian Sakhian" (also known as "Bhatt Vehee") and other Rehatnamas. Promoting the wearing of a Keski (turban) shows greater respect and reverence for the sacred hair. It also helps avoid the violation of damaging or dishonouring one's hair which is one of the 4 Bajjar Kurehits (cardinal sins), according to Sikh Rehit Maryada. Since most male Sikhs already wear a keski (turban), keski as a kakkar makes turban wearing a requirement for women as well.

During the Singh Sabha movement, there was a push to make Sikh women more dinstuishable from Hindu and Muslim women in-order to consolidate and standardize a separate Sikh identity. The Panch Khalsa Diwan, a radical faction on the fringes of the Singh Sabha movement led by Teja Singh Bhasaur, advocated for both of its male and female members to wear a turban. Women who refused to wear the turban were not allowed to become initiated by the Panch Khalsa Diwan. However, the faction eventually was sidelined by the dominant Tat Khalsa faction of the movement and disappeared. However, the Panch Khalsa Diwan's practice of making Sikh women wear a turban influenced Bhai Randhir Singh, founder of the Akhand Kirtani Jatha, who adopted the practice of Sikh women wearing a turban. Thus, the Akhand Kirtani Jatha enforces the turban on its female members.

=== Raagmala ===
The Panthic Sikh Rehat Maryada states:

"The reading of the whole Guru Granth Sahib (intermittent or non-stop) may be concluded with the reading of Mundawani or the Rag Mala according to the convention traditionally observed at the concerned place. (Since there is a difference of opinion within the Panth on this issue, nobody should dare to write or print a copy of the Guru Granth Sahib excluding the Rag Mala). Thereafter, after reciting the Anand Sahib, the Ardas of the conclusion of the reading should be offered and the sacred pudding (Karhah Prashad) distributed."

Raagmala is the title of a composition of twelve verses, running into sixty lines, appended to Sri Guru Granth Sahib Ji as a table or index of raags that appears after the "Mundaavni", i.e. the epilogue or "closing seal". The authorship of Raagmala has been the subject of controversy; more so the point of whether it should form part of the recitation of Gurbani in its entirety (i.e. being included in Sehaj Paath or Akhand Paath bhog/completion). The Jatha, do not believe in Raagmala being composed or written by the Guru Sahibs, but was added to Sri Guru Granth Sahib Ji at a later date.

== Organisation ==
The current official AKJ leadership details are:

=== Five Members Committee ===
1. Harbhajan Singh (Anandpur Saaheb)
2. Sahib Singh (Ludhiana)
3. Karam Singh (Tanda)
4. Hardial Singh (Gurdaspur)
5. Avtar Singh (Mallian)

=== Jathedaar ===
Mohinder Singh (Kaalaa Sanghaa)
