= Jhatka =

Animal slaughter in Sikhism

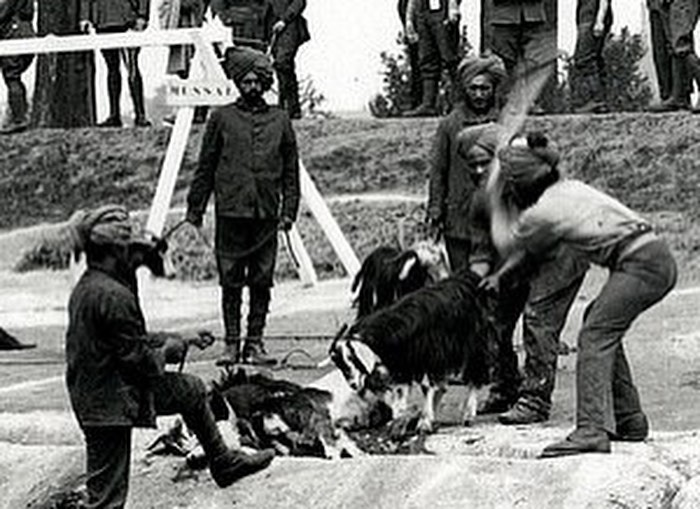
Photograph of Sikh soldiers performing a jhatka slaughter, c. 1914–16

Jhatka (Punjabi: ਝਟਕਾ, romanized: jhaṭkā pronounced [t͡ɕʌ˩˥ʈ.kaː]) is a method of slaughtering an animal for meat by a single strike of a sword or axe to sever its head within the Sikh religion and many Hindus. This kills the animal almost instantly. This type of slaughter is preferred by most meat-consuming Sikhs.

== Etymology ==
The Punjabi word ਝਟਕਾ, jhaṭkā is derived from the Sanskrit term झटिति, jhaṭiti which means "instantly" or "at once".

== Terminology for non-jhatka products ==
Slaughter by means such as kosher, halal and bali does not meet the requirements of jhatka and the products of it are referred to as kutha meat – abstention from which is one of the requirements for a Sikh to be an initiated Khalsa or sahajdhari according to the Rehat Maryada (Sikh code of conduct).

== Importance in Sikhism ==
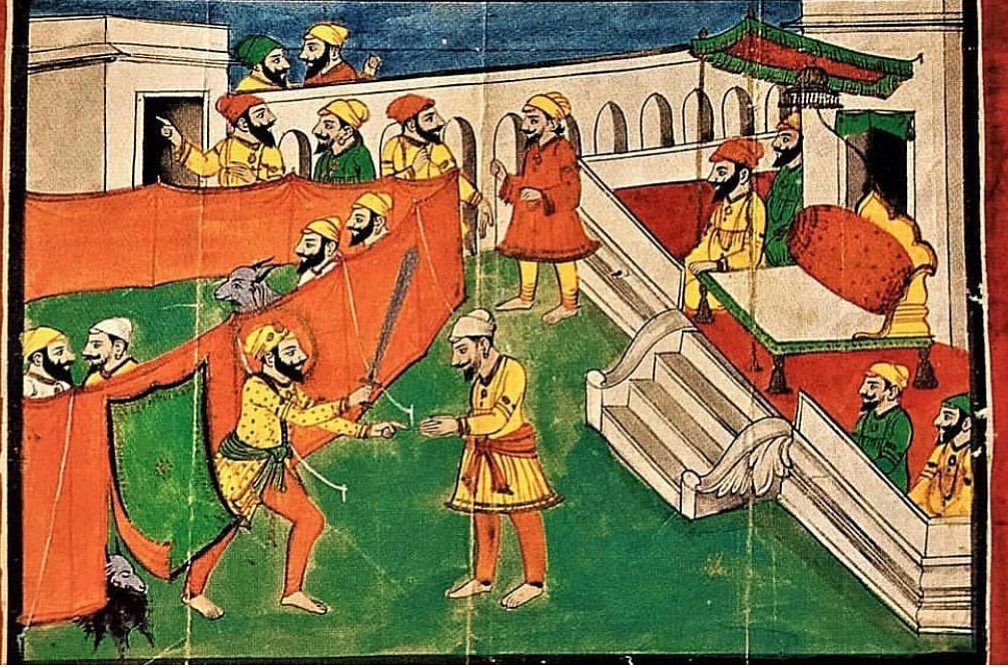
Late 19th century depiction of a jhatka slaughter by Guru Gobind Singh at Anandpur in 1699 to formalize the Khalsa Panth

Although not all Sikhs maintain the practice of eating meat butchered in this style, it was mandated by the ten Sikh Gurus:

According to the Sikh tradition, only such meat as is obtained from an animal which is killed with one stroke of the weapon causing instant death is fit for human consumption. Guru Gobind Singh took a rather serious view of this aspect of the whole matter. He, therefore, while permitting flesh to be taken as food repudiated the whole theory of this expiatory sacrifice. Accordingly, he made jhatka meat obligatory for those Sikhs who may be interested in taking meat as a part of their food.

— HS Singha, Sikhism, A Complete Introduction

The official Khalsa Code of Conduct and the Sikh Rehat Maryada forbid the consumption of Kutha meat, and Sikhs are recommended to eat jhatka meat.

In Sikhism, there are three objections to non-jhatka or kutha products: that sacrificing an animal in the name of God is ritualism and something to be avoided; that killing an animal with a slow bleeding method is inhumane; and historic opposition of the right of ruling Muslims to impose their practices on non-Muslims. Kutha meat includes not just Halal or Kosher meat but any meat produced by slow bleeding or the perceived religious sacrifice of animals, including meat from animals slaughtered ritualistically in Hinduism.

Jhatka karna or jhatkaund is the instant severing of the head of an animal with a single stroke of any weapon, with the underlying intention causing it minimal suffering.

During the British Raj, the Sikhs began to assert their right to slaughter through Jhatka. When jhatka meat was not allowed in jails, Sikhs detained for their part in the Akali movement resorted to violence and agitations to secure this right. Among the terms in the settlement between the Akalis and the Muslim Unionist government in Punjab in 1942 was that jhatka meat be allowed for Sikhs.

On Sikh religious festivals, including Hola Mohalla and Vaisakhi, at the Hazur Sahib Nanded, and many other Sikh Gurdwaras, jhatka meat is offered as "mahaprasad" to all visitors in a Gurdwara. This practice is considered to be unacceptable by modern Sikh sects who believe only lacto-vegetarian langar is supposed to be served inside gurudwaras after the introduction of Colonial-era "Mahants" and "Udasis" into Sikh Gurdwaras.

=== Opposition ===
Some Sikh organizations, such as the Akhand Kirtani Jatha, have their own codes of conduct regarding meat consumption. These organizations define kutha meat as any type of slaughtered meat, and eating meat of any type is forbidden aside from that which is slaughtered on religious festivals and individual "Akhand paht" three-day prayers.

In early 1987 Kharkus issued a moral code banning the sale and consumption of meat and calling for jhatka shops to be closed. The ban led to much of Punjab being without meat and the closing of jhatka shops. Those who continued to sell or eat meat risked death and commonly would have their businesses destroyed and be killed. One survey found that there were no meat or tobacco shops between Amritsar and Phagwara. At the peak of the militancy, most of Punjab was meatless. Famous restaurants that served meat removed it from their menu and denied ever serving it. The ban was popular among rural Sikhs. Kharkus justified the ban by saying, "No avatars, Hindu or Sikh, ever did these things. To eat meat is the job of rakshasas (demons) and we don't want people to become rakshasas."

== Comparison with Kosher and Halal methods ==
Both methods use sharp knives. In the kosher and halal methods, sheḥiṭah and Dhabihah respectively, the animal is slaughtered by one swift, uninterrupted cut severing the trachea, esophagus, carotid arteries, jugular veins, and vagus nerves, leaving the spinal cord intact, followed by a period where the blood of the animal is drained out. In the Jhatka method, a swift uninterrupted cut severs the head and the spine. In Dhabihah, a separate prayer is required before each animal is slaughtered. In sheḥiṭah, a blessing is required, but if the shoḥeṭ (slaughterer) forgets it, the meat is still considered acceptable. One bərakhah is sufficient for the slaughter of multiple animals, so long as there is no interruption between them. This prayer prevents the meat from being jhatka.

== Availability ==
In Ajmer (Rajasthan, India), there are many jhatka shops, with various bylaws requiring shops to display clearly that they sell jhatka meat.

In the past, there has been little availability of jhatka meat in the United Kingdom, so people have found themselves eating other types of meat, although jhatka has become more widely available.

== See also ==
- Halal – Islamic term for "permissible" things
- Christian dietary laws – Christian principles for daily food
- Dhabihah – Animal slaughter in Islamic law (Muslim method of ritual slaughter)
- Legal aspects of ritual slaughter
- Diet in Sikhism – Views on what followers of Sikhism are permitted to eat
- Shechita – Ritual slaughter of an animal in Jewish law
- Meat consumption among Sikhs
- Rehat – Sikh codes of conduct
