= Fishing trawler =

Commercial vessel designed to operate fishing trawls

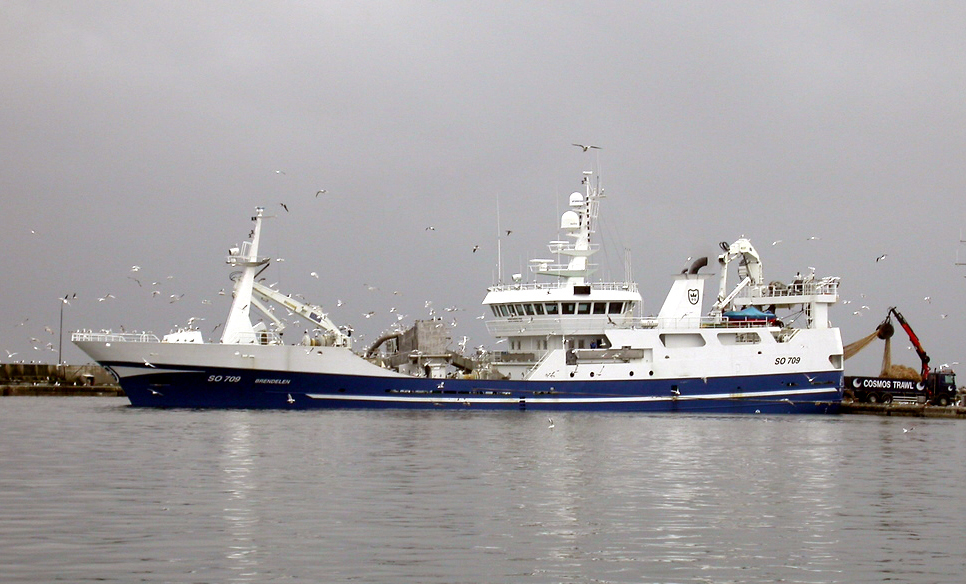
The Irish RSW Pelagic Trawler Brendelen SO709 in Skagen harbour

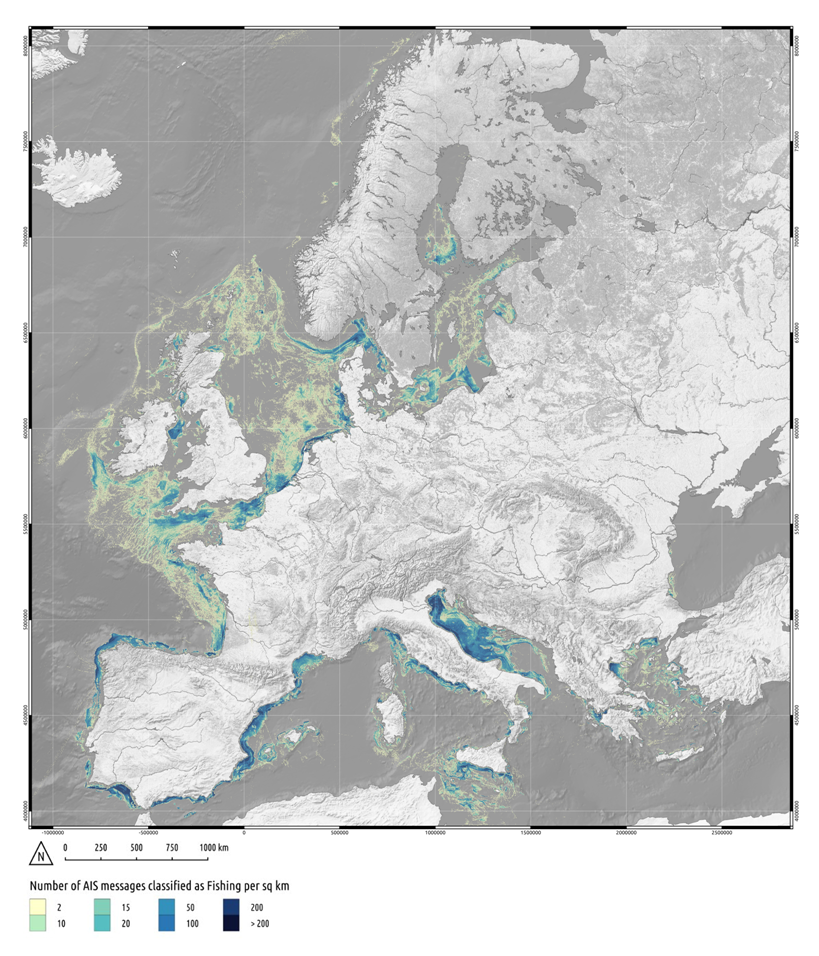
Fishing intensity extracted from Automatic Identification System data of EU trawlers greater than 15 metres in length, in the period October 2014 – September 2015 (see Main Map for full resolution)

A fishing trawler is a commercial fishing vessel designed to operate fishing trawls. Trawling is a method of fishing that involves actively dragging or pulling a trawl through the water behind one or more trawlers. Trawls are fishing nets that are pulled along the bottom of the sea or in midwater at a specified depth. A trawler may also operate two or more trawl nets simultaneously (double-rig and multi-rig).

There are many variants of trawling gear. They vary according to local traditions, bottom conditions, and how large and powerful the trawling boats are. A trawling boat can be a small open boat with only 30 horsepower (22 kW) or a large factory ship with 10,000 horsepower (7457 kW). Trawl variants include beam trawls, large-opening midwater trawls, and large bottom trawls, such as "rock hoppers" that are rigged with heavy rubber wheels that let the net crawl over rocky bottom.

== History ==
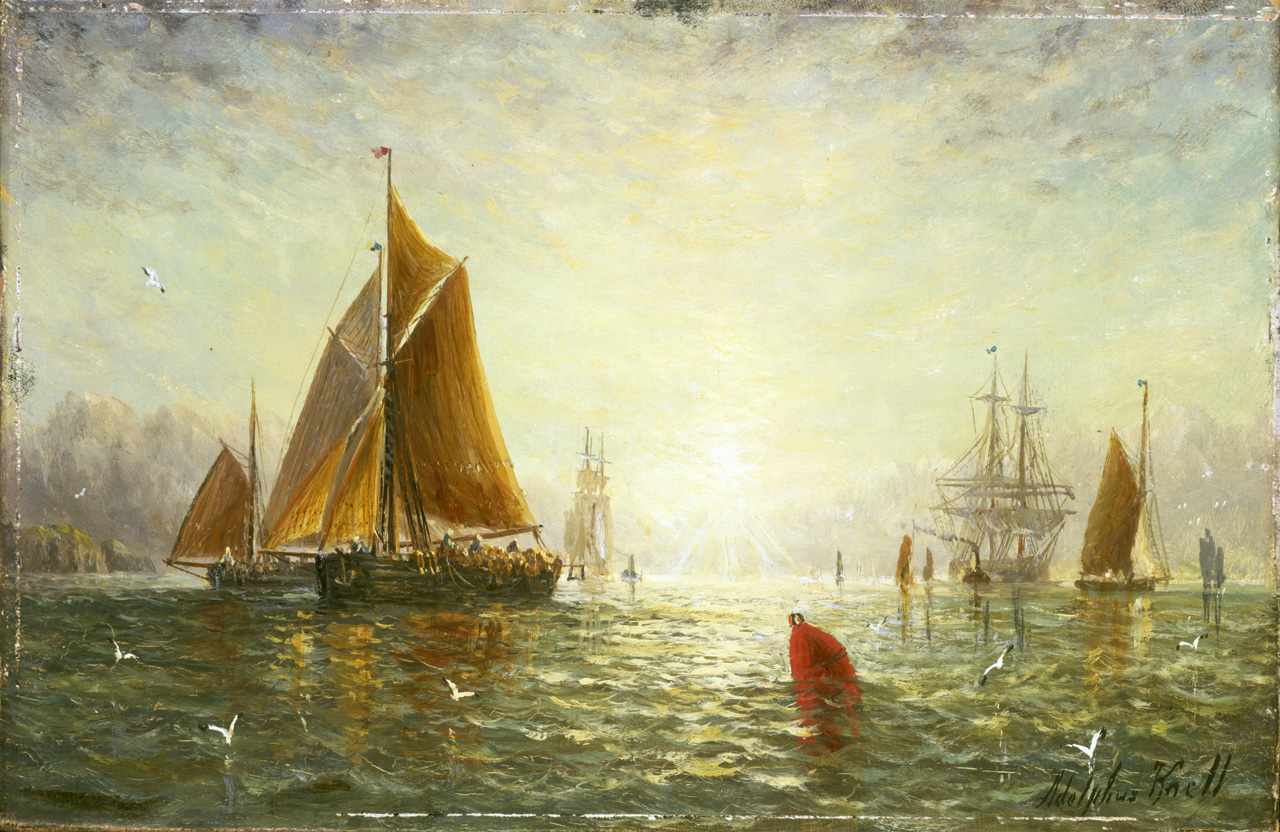
Painting of A Brixham trawler by William Adolphus Knell. The painting is now in the National Maritime Museum.

The 17th century saw the development of an early type of sailing trawler called a Dogger, which commonly operated in the North Sea. It takes its name from an earlier type of the same name, and from the area fished. The word is the Dutch word for codfish (dogge), but has come to mean a fishing vessel which tows a trawl. Doggers were slow but sturdy, capable of fishing in the rough conditions of the North Sea.

The modern fishing trawler was developed in the 19th century, at the English fishing port of Brixham. By the early 19th century, the fishermen at Brixham needed to expand their fishing area further than ever before due to the ongoing depletion of stocks that was occurring in the overfished waters of South Devon. The Brixham trawler that evolved there was of a sleek build and had a tall gaff rig, which gave the vessel sufficient speed to make long-distance trips out to the fishing grounds in the ocean. They were also sufficiently robust to be able to tow large trawls in deep water. The great trawling fleet that built up at Brixham earned the village the title of "Mother of Deep-Sea Fisheries".

This revolutionary design made large scale trawling in the ocean possible for the first time, resulting in a substantial migration of fishermen from the ports in the South of England, to villages further north, such as Scarborough, Hull, Grimsby, Harwich and Yarmouth, that were points of access to the large fishing grounds in the Atlantic Ocean. The small village of Grimsby grew to become the largest fishing port in the world by the mid 19th century. With the tremendous expansion in the fishing industry, the Grimsby Dock Company was opened in 1854 as the first modern fishing port. The facilities incorporated many innovations of the time – the dock gates and cranes were operated by hydraulic power, and the 300-foot (91 m) Grimsby Dock Tower was built to provide a head of water with sufficient pressure by William Armstrong.

The elegant Brixham trawler spread across the world, influencing fishing fleets everywhere. By the end of the 19th century, there were over 3,000 fishing trawlers in commission in Britain, with almost 1,000 at Grimsby. These trawlers were sold to fishermen around Europe, including from the Netherlands and Scandinavia. Twelve trawlers went on to form the nucleus of the German fishing fleet.

=== Advent of steam power ===
The earliest steam-powered fishing boats first appeared in the 1870s and used the trawl system of fishing as well as lines and drift nets. These were large boats, usually 80–90 feet (24–27 m) in length with a beam of around 20 feet (6.1 m). They weighed 40–50 tons and travelled at 9–11 knots (17–20 km/h; 10–13 mph).

The earliest purpose-built fishing vessels were designed and made by David Allan in Leith in March 1875, when he converted a drifter to steam power. In 1877, he built the first screw-propelled steam trawler in the world. This vessel was Pioneer LH854. She was of wooden construction with two masts and carried a gaff-rigged main and mizen using booms, and a single foresail. Allan argued that his motivation for steam power was to increase the safety of fishermen. However local fishermen saw power trawling as a threat. Allan built a total of ten boats at Leith between 1877 and 1881. Twenty-one boats were completed at Granton, his last vessel being Degrave in 1886. Most of these were sold to foreign owners in France, Belgium, Spain and the West Indies.

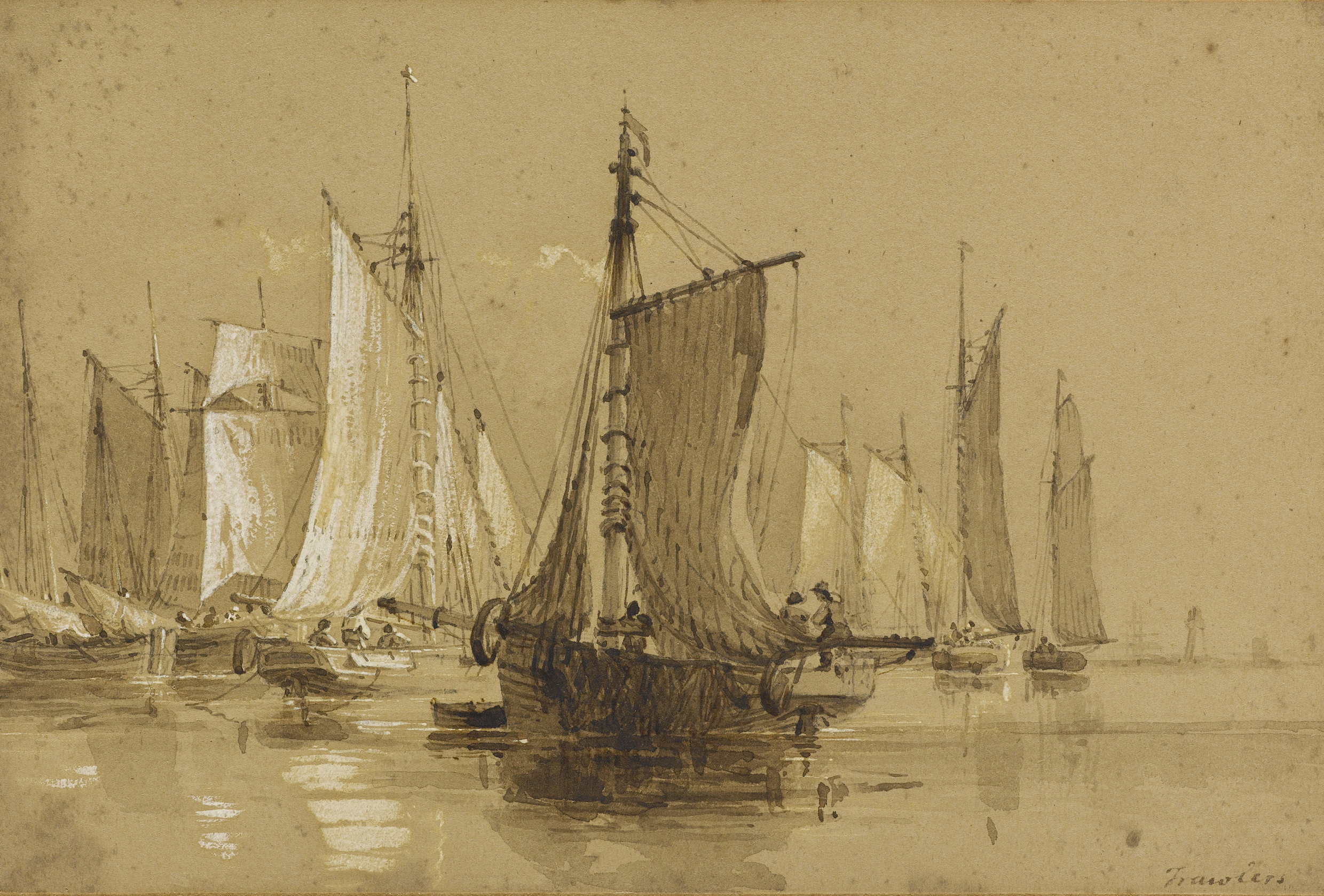
Trawlers between 1840 and 1850

The first steam boats were made of wood, but steel hulls were soon introduced and were divided into watertight compartments. They were well designed for the crew with a large building that contained the wheelhouse and the deckhouse. The boats built in the 20th century only had a mizzen sail, which was used to help steady the boat when its nets were out. The main function of the mast was now as a crane for lifting the catch ashore. It also had a steam capstan on the foredeck near the mast for hauling nets. These boats had a crew of twelve made up of a skipper, driver, fireman (to look after the boiler) and nine deck hands.

Steam fishing boats had many advantages. They were usually about 20 ft longer (6.1 m) than the sailing vessels so they could carry more nets and catch more fish. This was important, as the market was growing quickly at the beginning of the 20th century. They could travel faster and further and with greater freedom from weather, wind and tide. Because less time was spent travelling to and from the fishing grounds, more time could be spent fishing. The steam boats also gained the highest prices for their fish, as they could return quickly to harbour with their fresh catch.

Steam trawlers were introduced at Grimsby and Hull in the 1880s. In 1890 it was estimated that there were 20,000 men on the North Sea. The steam drifter was not used in the herring fishery until 1897. The last sailing fishing trawler was built in 1925 in Grimsby.

=== Further development ===
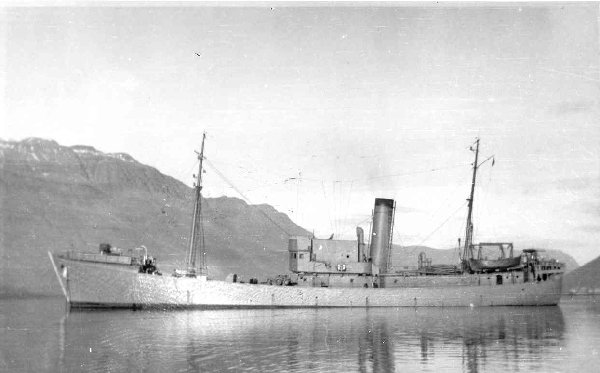
Armed trawler HNoMS Honningsvåg off Iceland

Trawler designs adapted as the way they were powered changed from sail to coal-fired steam by World War I to diesel and turbines by the end of World War II.

The first trawlers fished over the side, rather than over the stern. In 1947, the company Christian Salvesen, based in Leith, Scotland, refitted a surplus Algerine-class minesweeper (HMS Felicity) with refrigeration equipment and a factory ship stern ramp, to produce the first combined freezer/stern trawler in 1947.

The first purpose-built stern trawler was Fairtry built in 1953 at Aberdeen. The ship was much larger than any other trawlers then in operation and inaugurated the era of the super trawler. As the ship pulled its nets over the stern, it could lift out a much greater haul of up to 60 tonnes. Lord Nelson followed in 1961, installed with vertical plate freezers that had been researched and built at the Torry Research Station. These ships served as a basis for the expansion of super trawlers around the world in the following decades.

Since World War II, commercial fishing vessels have been increasingly equipped with electronic aids, such as radio navigation aids and fish finders. During the Cold War, some countries fitted fishing trawlers with additional electronic gear so they could be used as spy ships to monitor the activities of other countries.

== Modern trawlers ==
Modern trawlers are usually decked vessels designed for robustness. Their superstructure (wheelhouse and accommodation) can be forward, midship or aft. Motorised winches, electronic navigation and sonar systems are usually installed. Fishing equipment varies in sophistication depending on the size of the vessel and the technology used. Design features for modern fishing trawlers vary substantially, as many national maritime jurisdictions do not impose compulsory vessel inspection standards for smaller commercial fishing vessels.

=== Mechanised hauling ===
Mechanised hauling devices are used on modern trawlers. Trawl winches, such as Gilson winches, net drums and other auxiliary winches are installed on deck to control the towing warps (trawling wires) and store them when not in use.

=== Electronics ===
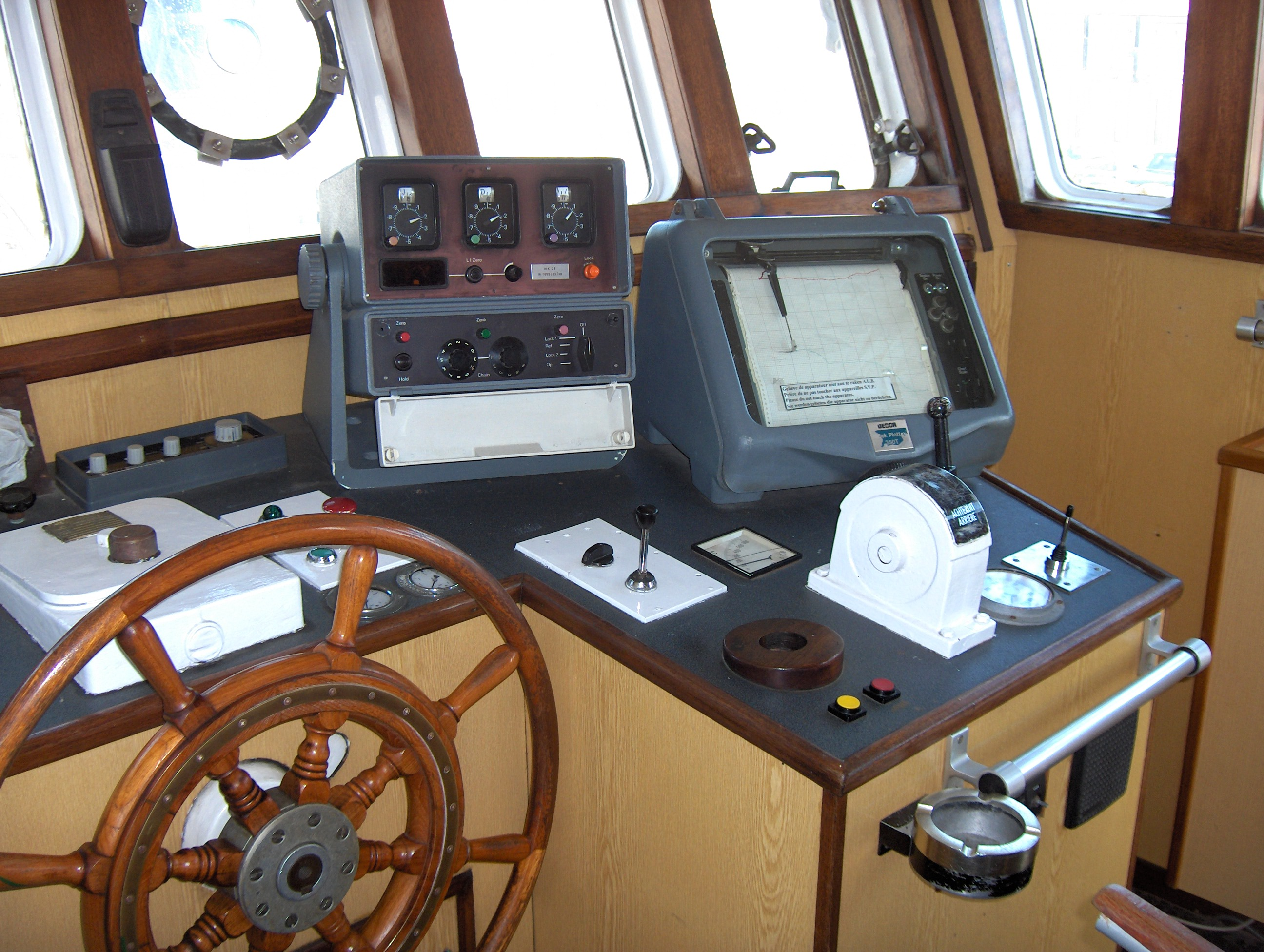
Decca Navigator (Mark 21) and Decca Track Plotter (the forerunners of modern GNSS navigation and plotting equipment) on the bridge of this (rather dated) trawler.

Modern trawlers make extensive use of contemporary electronics, including navigation and communication equipment, fish detection devices, and equipment to control and monitor gear. Just which equipment will be installed depends on the size and type of the trawler.

Much of this equipment can be controlled from the wheelhouse or bridge. Smaller trawlers have wheelhouses, where electronic equipment for navigation, communications, fish detection and trawl sensors are typically arranged about the skipper's chair. Larger vessels have a bridge, with a command console at the centre and a further co-pilot chair. Modern consoles display all the key information on an integrated display. Less frequently used sensors and monitors may be mounted on the deckhead.

Navigational instruments, such as an autopilot and GNSS, are used for manoeuvring the vessel in harbour and at sea. Radar can be used, for example, when pair trawling to keep the correct distance between the two vessels. Communication instruments range from basic radio devices to maritime distress systems and EPIRBs, as well as devices for communicating with the crew. Fish detection devices, such as echosounders and sonar, are used to locate fish.

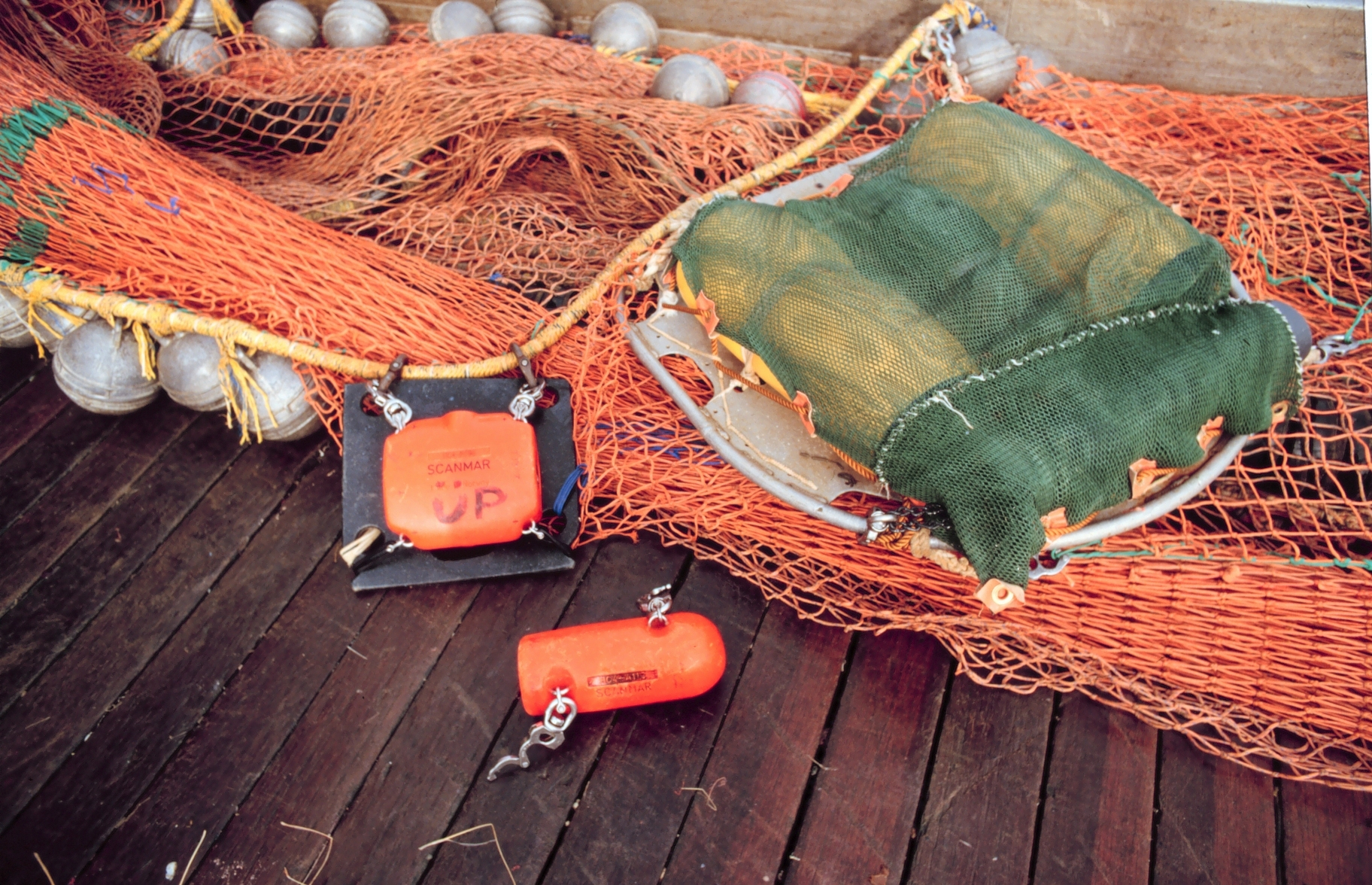
A net mensurations system using acoustic sensors which measure the depth and opening of the trawl net.

During trawling operations, a range of trawl sensors may be used to assist with controlling and monitoring gear. These are often referred to as "trawl monitoring systems" or "net mensuration systems".

- net sounders (trawl eyes) give information about the concentration of fish around the opening to the trawl, as well as the clearances around the opening and the bottom of the trawl
- catch sensors give information about the rate at which the cod end is filling.
- symmetry sensors give information about the optimal geometry of the trawls.
- tension sensors give information about how much tension is in the warps and sweeps.

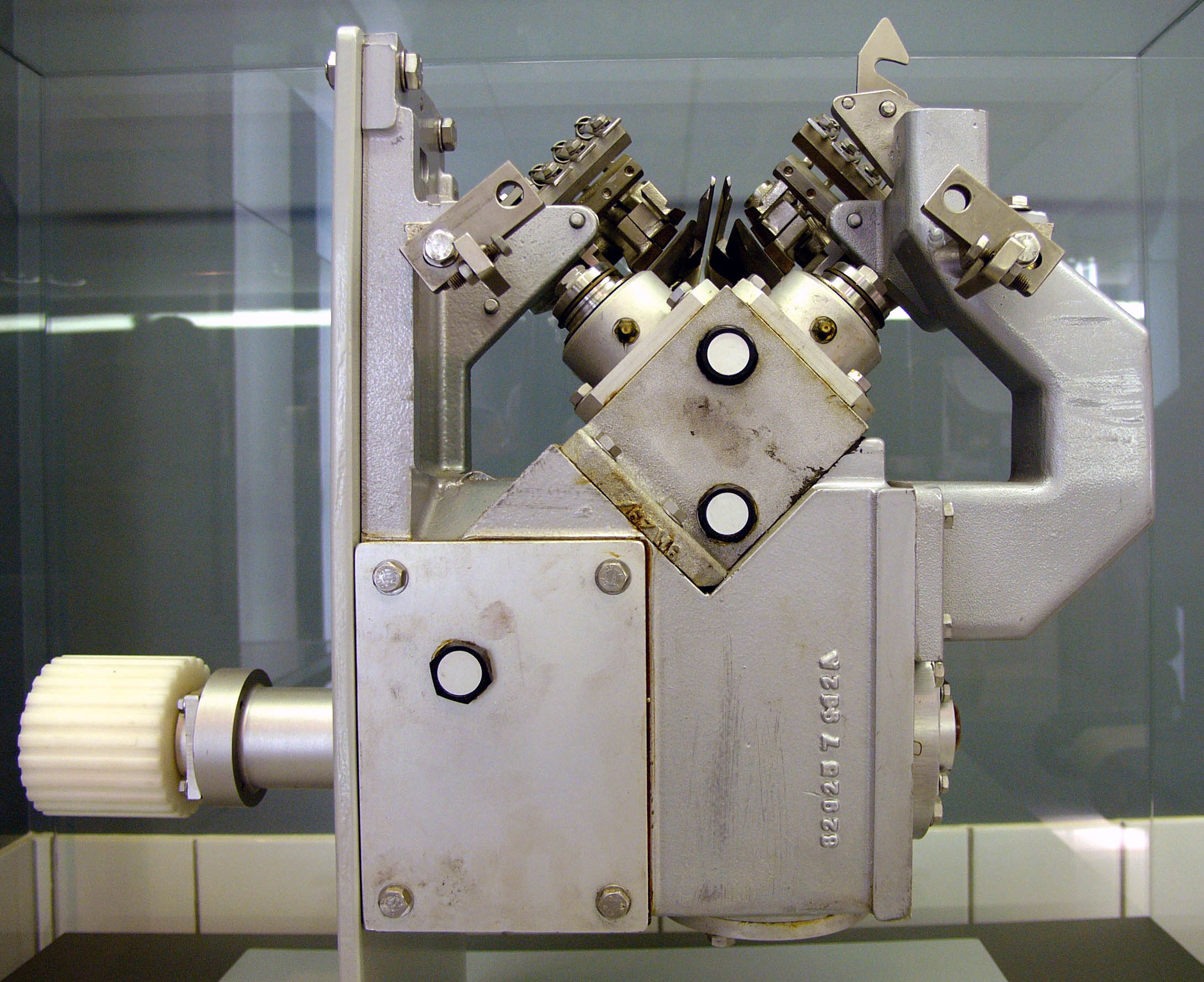
Automatic knives for filleting fish

=== Fish storage and processing ===
Modern trawlers store the fish they catch in some form of chilled condition. At the least, the fish will be stored in boxes covered with ice or stored with ice in the fish hold. In general, the fish are kept fresh by chilling them with ice or refrigerated sea water, or freezing them in blocks. Also, many trawlers carry out some measure of onboard fish processing, and the larger the vessel, the more likely it is to include fish processing facilities. For example, the catch can undergo some preliminary processing by being passed through sorting and washing devices. At a further stage, the fish might be mechanically gutted and filleted. Factory trawlers may process fish oil and fish meal and may include canning plants.

=== Other design features ===
Crew quarters are usually below the wheelhouse and may include bunks, with cot sides to stop the occupant from rolling out in heavy weather. The need for drying sea clothes is shown by a notice in at least one steam trawler's boiler room saying "Do not dry oil frocks over the boiler".

== Trawler types ==
External image
- FAO descriptions and illustrations of various types of trawlers (PDF pages 11-17)

Trawlers can be classified by their architecture, the type of fish they catch, the fishing method used, or geographical origin. The classification used below follows the FAO, who classify trawlers by the gear they use.

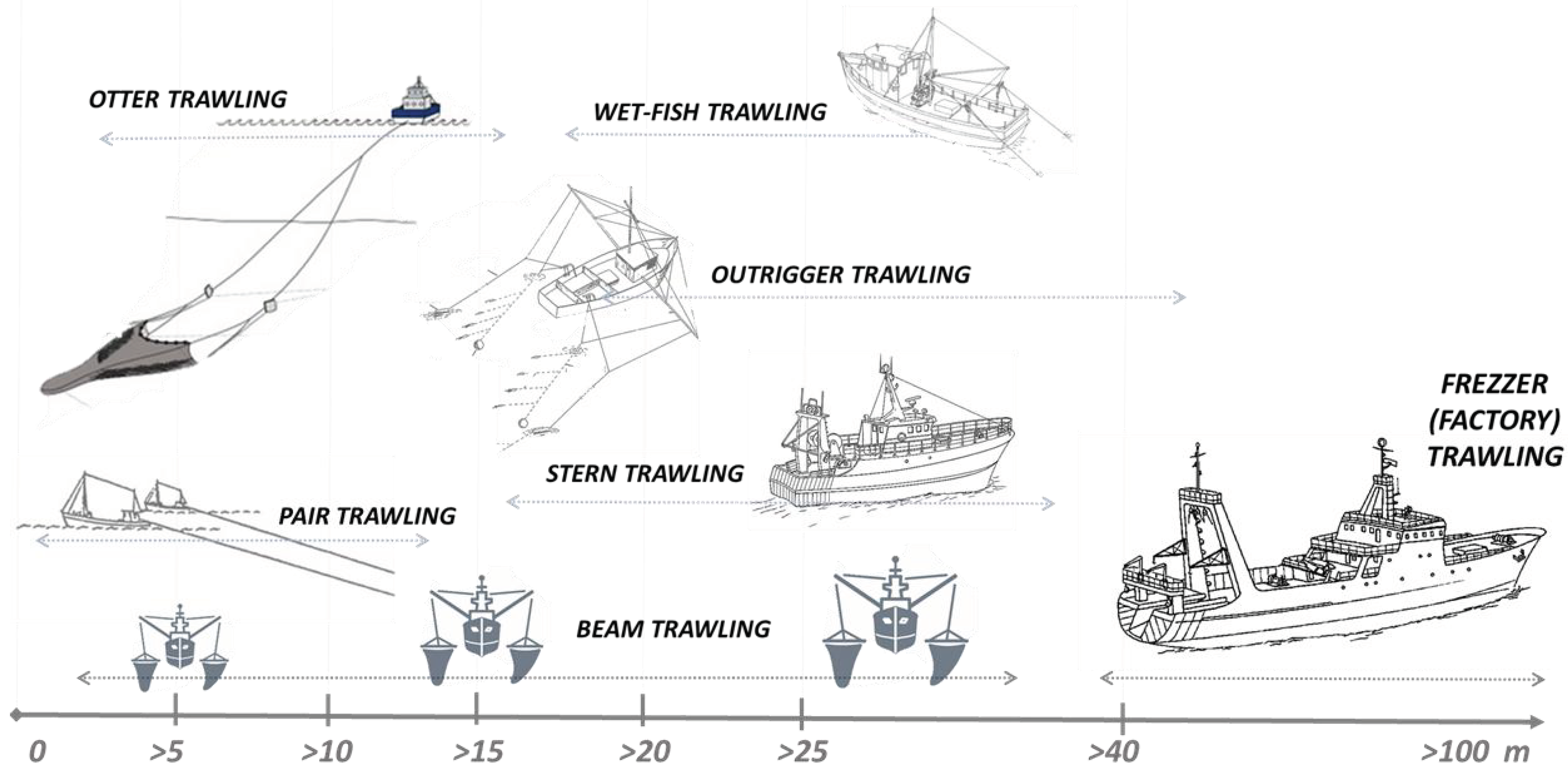
Trawler classifion by the type of gear and standard length

=== Outrigger trawlers ===
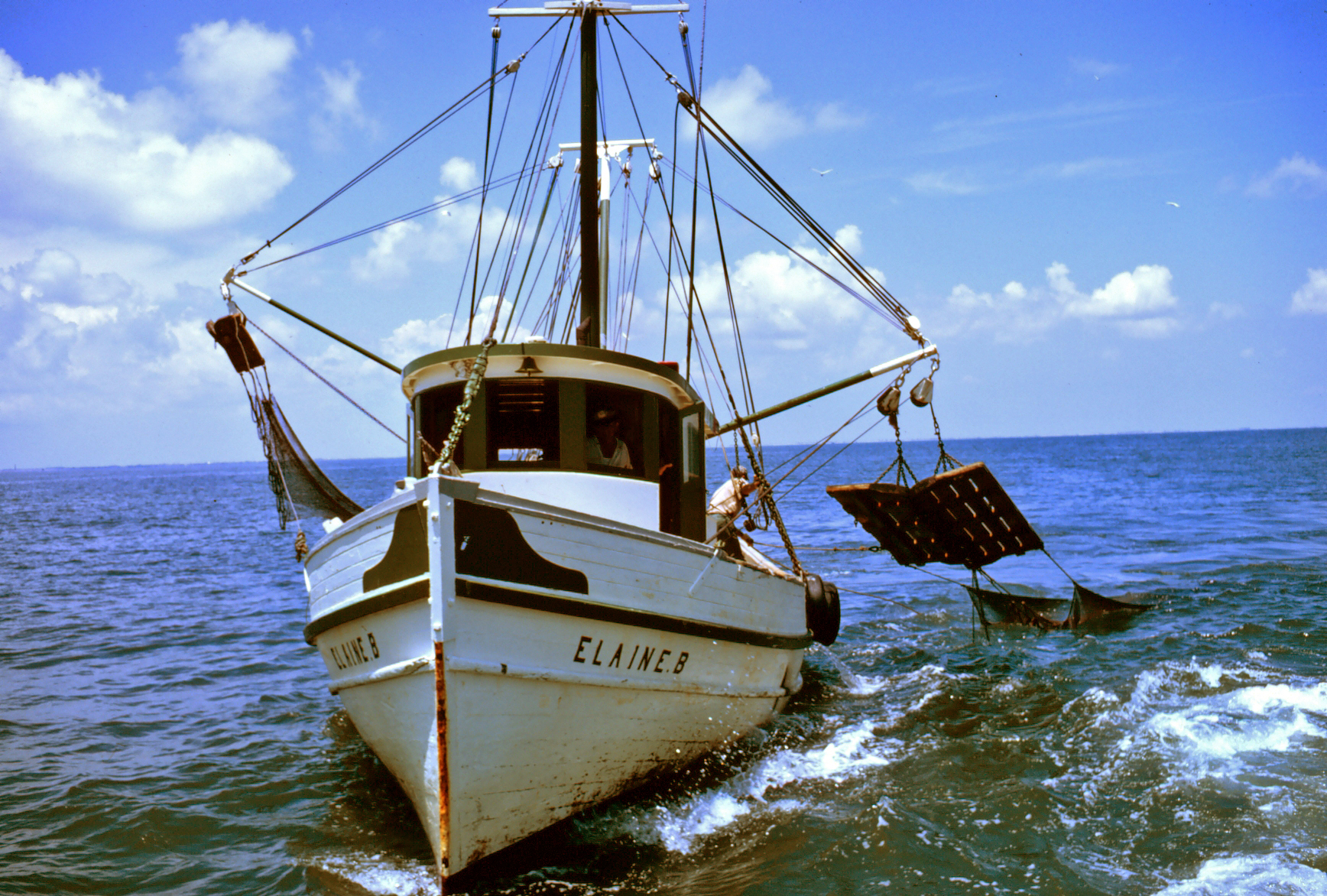
This small shrimp trawler uses outriggers, with a forward deckhouse and aft working deck.

Outrigger trawlers use outriggers, or booms, to tow the trawl. These outriggers are usually fastened to, or at the foot of the mast and extend out over the sides of the vessel during fishing operations. Each side can deploy a twin trawl or a single otter trawl. Outrigger trawlers may have the superstructure forward or aft. Warp winches with capstans are installed on the deck to haul the catch.

- Outrigger trawlers with a forward superstructure and aft working deck are widely used to target shrimp. The towing winch is usually located to the rear of the superstructure so warps from the drums feed to bollards on the cap rail, and then to towing blocks on the outriggers.
- Outrigger trawlers with aft superstructure and midship working deck are usually beam trawlers (see below). These use large beams to rig the trawls.

Outrigger trawlers use vertical fish finders of different kinds, according to their size. Drawing (FAO)

=== Beam trawlers ===
Beam trawlers are a type of outrigger trawler (above), with the superstructure aft and the working deck amidships. They use a very strong outrigger boom on each side, each towing a beam trawl, with the warps going through blocks at the end of the boom. This arrangement makes it easier to stow and handle the large beams. The outriggers are controlled from a midship A-frame or mast. The towing winch is forward of the superstructure, with the towing warps passed through deck bollards and then out to the towing blocks on the booms.

Beam trawling is used in the flatfish fisheries in the North Sea. They are equipped with equipment for hauling the net and stowing it aboard. Typically an multibeam echosounder is used for finding fish.

They are medium-sized and high-powered vessels, towing gear at speeds up to 8 knots. To avoid the boat capsizing if the trawl snags on the sea floor, winch brakes can be installed, along with safety release systems in the boom stays. The engine power of bottom trawlers is restricted to 2000 HP (1472 kW) for further safety.

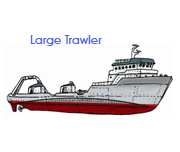

=== Otter trawlers ===
Otter trawlers deploy one or more parallel trawls kept apart horizontally using otter boards. These trawls can be towed in midwater or along the bottom. Otter trawlers range in size from sailing canoes to supertrawlers.

Otter trawlers usually have two gallows at the stern with towing blocks. The towing warps run through these, each regulated by its own winch. Medium and large trawlers usually have a stern ramp for hauling the trawl onto the deck. Some trawlers tow twin parallel trawls, using three warps, each warp with its own winch. Some otter trawlers are also outrigger trawlers (above), using outriggers to tow one or two otter trawls from each side.

Usually otter trawlers have the superstructure forward, though it can be aft or amidship. Gallows are on the stern quarters or there is a stern gantry for operating the otter boards. Pelagic trawlers can use fish pumps to empty the cod end.

=== Pair trawlers ===
Pair trawlers are trawlers which operate together towing a single trawl. They keep the trawl open horizontally by keeping their distance when towing. Otter boards are not used. Pair trawlers operate both midwater and bottom trawls.

The superstructure is forward or midships and the working deck aft. Pelagic trawlers can have fish pumps to empty the codend.

=== Side trawlers ===
Side trawlers have the trawl deployed over the side with the trawl warps passing through blocks suspended from a forward gallow and an aft gallow. Usually the superstructure is towards the stern, the fish hold amidships, and the transversal trawl winch forward of the superstructure. A derrick may be boom-rigged to the foremast to help shoot the cod end from the side. Until the late 1960s, side trawlers were the most common deepsea boat used in North Atlantic fisheries. The 1950s side trawler, Ross Tiger is preserved in Grimsby while the larger, 1960s distant water vessel, the Arctic Corsair is preserved in Hull. These trawlers were used for a longer period than other kinds of trawlers, but are now being replaced by stern trawlers. Some side trawlers still in use have been equipped with net drums.

=== Stern trawlers ===
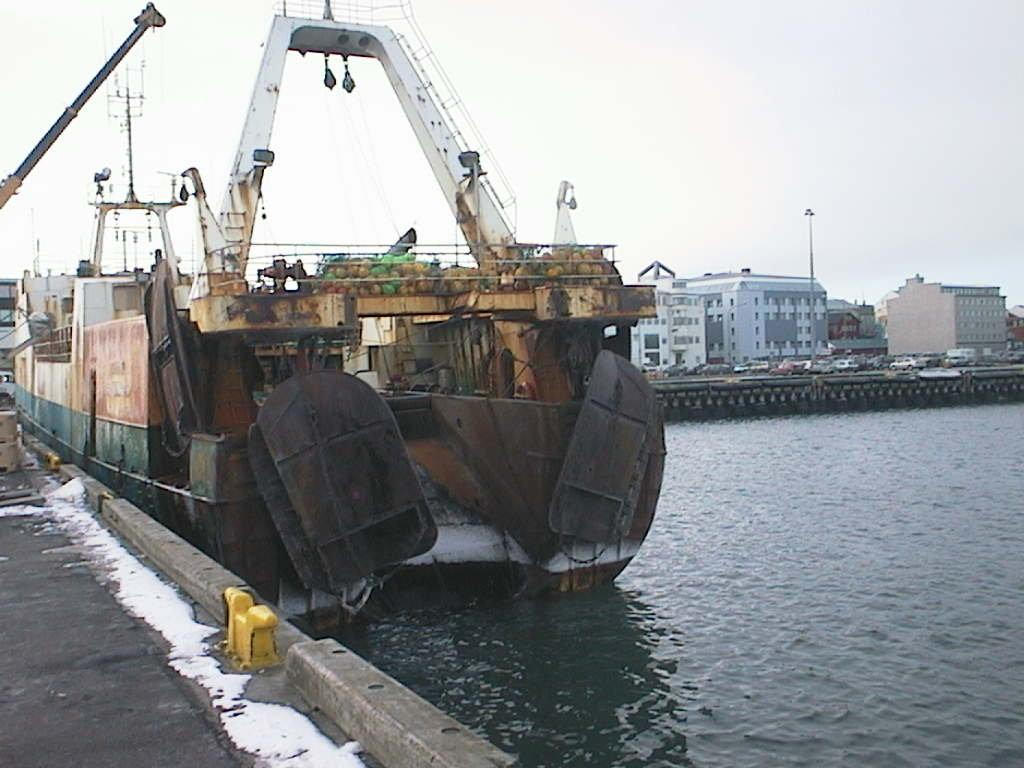
An Icelandic stern trawler

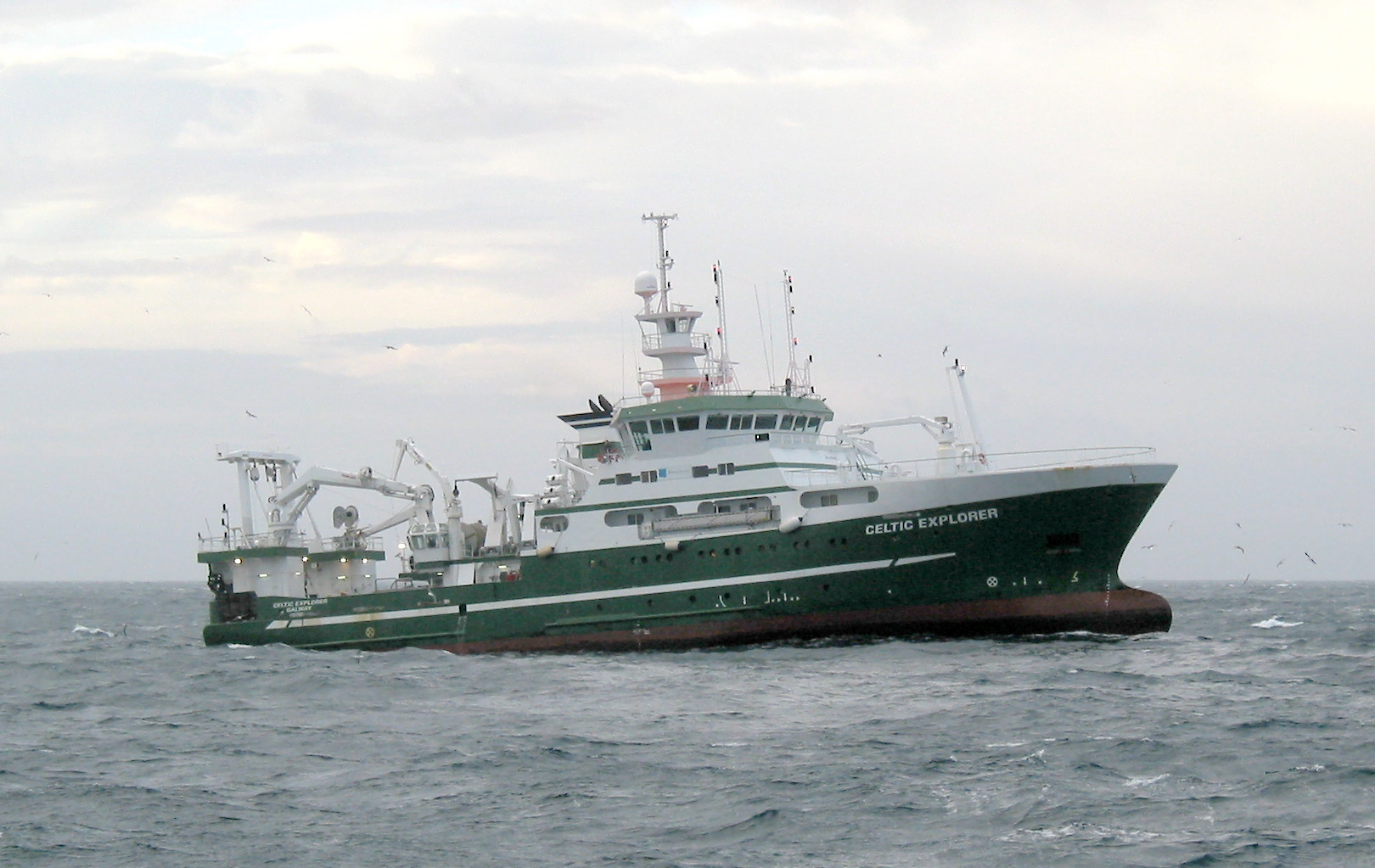
RV Celtic Explorer, a bottom trawler used for research

Stern trawlers have trawls which are deployed and retrieved from the stern. Larger stern trawlers often have a ramp, though pelagic and small stern trawlers are often designed without a ramp. Stern trawlers are designed to operate in most weather conditions. They can work alone when midwater or bottom trawling, or two can work together as pair trawlers. The superstructure is forward with an aft working deck. At the stern are gallows or a gantry for operating otter boards.

Any fish processing usually occurs in deck houses or below deck. A wet fish stern trawler stores the fish in ice or sea water which has been refrigerated. A freezer stern trawler stores the fish in frozen boxes or blocks, and a factory stern trawler processes the catch. A pelagic stern trawler may use fish pumps to empty the codend.

=== Freezer trawlers ===
The majority of trawlers operating on the high seas are freezer trawlers. They have facilities for preserving fish by freezing, allowing them to remain at sea for extended periods of time. They are medium- to large-size trawlers, with the same general arrangement as stern or side trawlers. Drawing (FAO)

=== Wet fish trawlers ===
External image
- A drawing of a wet fish trawler

Wet fish trawlers are trawlers where the fish are kept in the hold in a fresh/wet condition, in boxes covered with ice or with ice in the fish hold. They must operate in areas close to their landing place, and the time such a vessel can spend fishing is limited.

=== Trawler/purse seiners ===
Trawler/purse seiners are designed so the deck equipment, including an appropriate combination winch, can be rearranged and used for both methods. Blocks, purse davits, trawl gallows and rollers need to be arranged so they control the pursing lines and warp leads and in such a way as to reduce the time required to convert from one arrangement to the other. These vessels are usually classified as trawlers, since the power requirement for trawling is higher.

=== Naval trawlers ===
During both World Wars some countries created small warships by converting and arming existing trawlers or building new vessels to standard trawler designs. They were typically armed with a small naval gun and sometimes depth charges, and were used for patrolling, escorting other vessels and minesweeping.

== Safety ==
Occupational safety is a concern on fishing trawlers. For example, a United States cooperative which operates a fleet of 24 bottom trawlers in Alaskan water reported 25 fatalities over the period 2001–2012. The risk of a fatal injury was 41 times higher than the average for workers in the United States.

== See also ==
- Drifter (fishing boat)
- Fishing Tug Katherine V
- Net cutter (fisheries patrol)
- Recreational trawler
- Trolling (fishing)
