= Fish fillet processor =

A fish fillet processor processes fish into a fillet. Fish processing starts from the time the fish is caught. Popular species processed include cod, hake, haddock, tuna, herring, mackerel, salmon and pollock.

Commercial fish processing is a global practice. Processing varies regionally in productivity, type of operation, yield and regulation. Approximately 90% of processed fish are oceanic fish. The remaining 10% are from conciliatory freshwater operations and aquacultural production. Most fish processing industries are near commercial fishing zones. In certain regions, fish are transported or exported for processing.

== Major fish processing countries ==
The largest fish processing countries in order are:

- Vietnam
- China
- Peru
- Chile
- Japan
- The United States
- The Russian Federation
- Indonesia

These countries produce over half the world's fish products. The Pacific Northwest region of the United States provides the greatest volume.

== Uses of processed fish ==
Seventy-five percent of fish processed is for human consumption. Fish oil and fish meal comprise the remaining 25% of fish processing, with fish meal predominantly used in livestock feed and aquaculture.

Fresh fish accounts for 30% of production. Most processed fish is sold frozen as fillets or whole fish, canned fish and as other fish protein products (e.g. surimi). The consumption of frozen fish products as ready-to-eat meals, fillets, and whole fish is increasing globally.

== Processing procedures ==
Processing can start either on the fishing vessel or at the plants. For example, sometimes the fish are beheaded and gutted on the fishing vessel itself.

The process involved in filleting of whitefish is moderately different as compared to the filleting of oily fish.

=== Whitefish ===
In certain fish processing industries, filleting is done manually.

The fish is be-headed, gutted, de-iced and de-scaled. It is then graded and filleted by hand. After the processing phase, the fish fillet is trimmed for blood, bones, fins, black membrane, fleas, loose fish scales and sorted. It is then packed and frozen in cold storage.

=== Processing of oily fish ===
Oily fish have oils throughout their tissues and in the stomach cavity around the gut. Up to 30% of oil is found in the fillet, varying across species. Examples of oily fish include salmon, tuna, mackerel, herring and anchovy.

Due to the oil content, gutting and heading is avoided to reduce the risk associated with oily surfaces. The oily skin is kept as it retains the quality of the flesh. The filleting process is almost the same for the whitefish breeds, but oily fish is mostly canned.

== See also ==
- Filleted fish
- Fish processing
