= Sacrificial lamb =

Person sacrificed for the common good

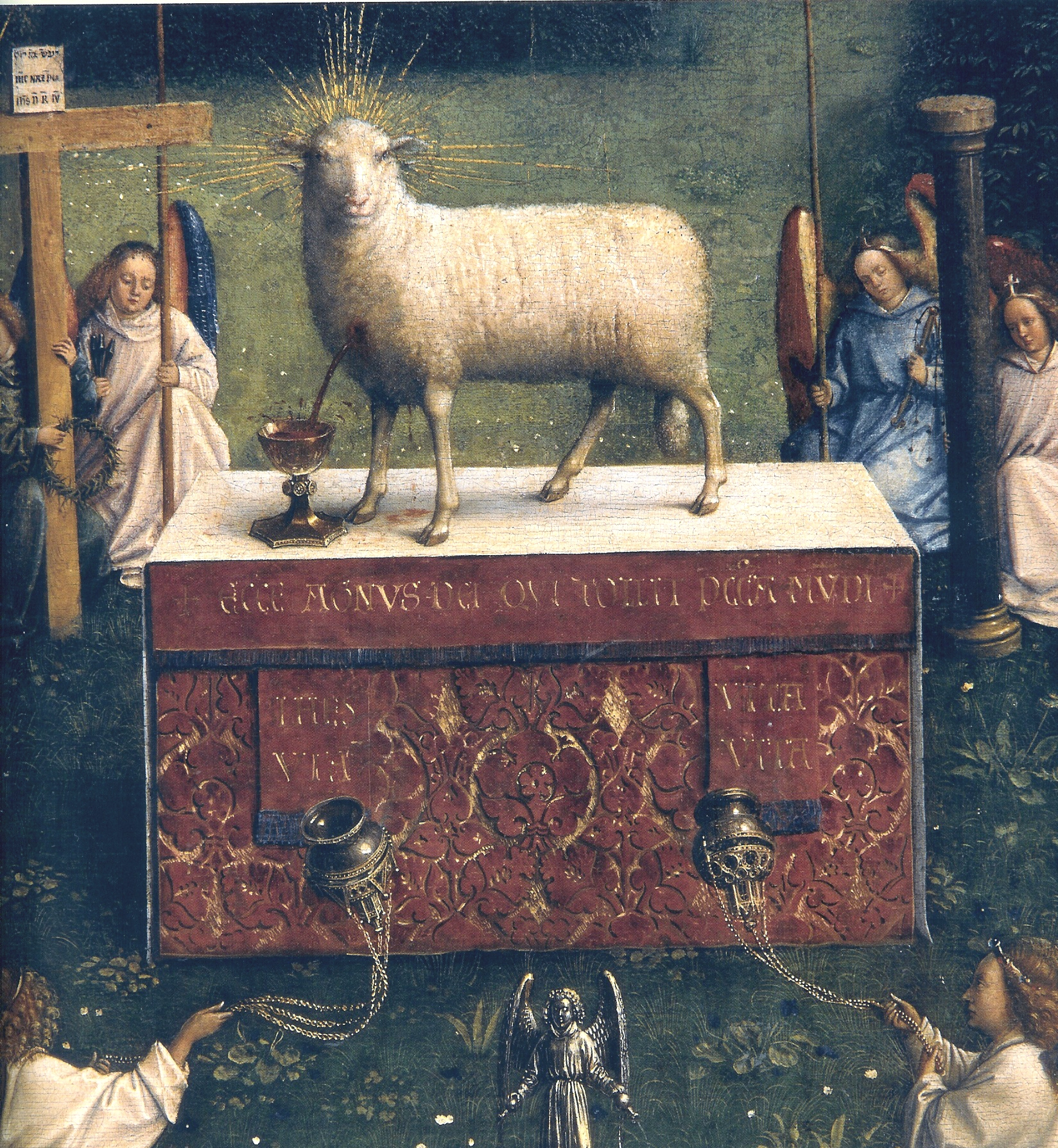
Ghent Altarpiece by Jan van Eyck

A sacrificial lamb is a metaphorical reference to a person or animal sacrificed for the common good. The term is derived from the traditions of the Abrahamic religions where a lamb is a highly valued possession.

== In politics ==
In politics, a sacrificial lamb candidate is a candidate chosen to contest an election with little chance of victory. The political party thus appoints the person as a sort of "sacrifice" to the stronger opponent.

In some cases, fielding a sacrificial lamb candidate can serve as an opportunity for the party to be more creative in choosing a candidate than would normally be considered acceptable in a closely contested race. Alan Keyes and Geraldine A. Ferraro are examples in American politics. In 1956, Adlai Stevenson was considered a sacrificial lamb candidate for president against Dwight Eisenhower. In 2004, Howard Mills was considered a sacrificial lamb candidate for the U.S. Senate from New York against Chuck Schumer.

== In the arts ==
In cinema and literature, a "sacrificial lamb" is a supporting character who's murdered by a villain, which prompts the protagonist to avenge them. The sacrificial lamb is often the protagonist's family member, partner, or friend. They can also be a defenceless stranger, such as an orphan. The virtuous hero mourns the sacrificial lamb's death, foiling the wicked villain who celebrates their enemy's defeat. The lamb's murder justifies the rivalry between the hero and the villain. Because no complex setup is needed to establish the trope, it is often criticised as a shallow way to create narrative conflict. A similar trope is the Women in Refrigerators, where the male hero's girlfriend, sister, or mother gets murdered.

An example of this trope's use in early literature is Macaria in Heracleidae by Euripides. The revenge tragedy theatrical genre is defined by this trope, coupled with the hero's own tragic death.

In modern media, examples include Anthony Edwards' character Goose in Top Gun, as well as Phil Coulson in The Avengers.

== See also ==
- Cannon fodder, an expression used to denote the treatment of armed forces as a worthless commodity to be expended
- Dušni Brav
- Forlorn hope, the initial wave of troops attacking a fortress or other strongpoint, who usually took horrendous casualties
- Identified patient
- Korban Pesach, also known as the "Paschal Lamb"
- Kourbania
- Lamb of God, a direct reference to Jesus Christ who, in death, is traditionally considered to have played the role of a sacrificial lamb
- Redshirt (stock character), a stock character in science fiction whose sole purpose is to die violently soon after being introduced
- Scapegoat
- Binding of Isaac
