= Animal sacrifice =

Ritual

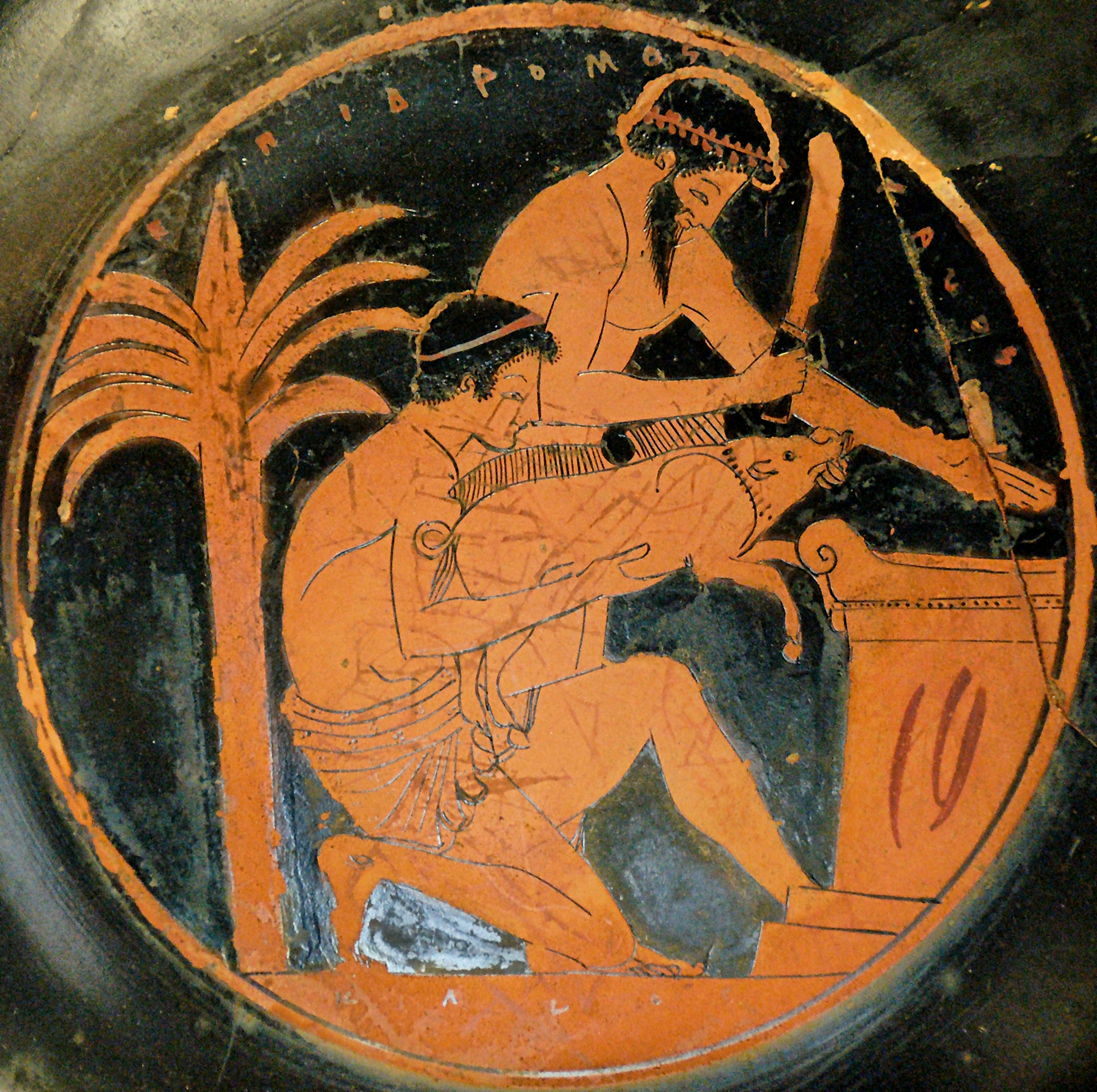
Sacrifice of a pig in ancient Greece (tondo from an Attic red-figure cup, 510–500 BCE, by the Epidromos Painter, collections of the Louvre)

Animal sacrifice is the ritual killing and offering of animals, usually as part of a religious ritual or to appease or maintain favour with a deity. Animal sacrifices were common throughout Europe and the Ancient Near East until the spread of Christianity in Late Antiquity, and continue in some cultures or religions today. Human sacrifice, where it existed, was always much rarer.

All or only part of a sacrificial animal may be offered; some cultures, like the Ancient Greeks ate most of the edible parts of the sacrifice in a feast, and burnt the rest as an offering. Others burnt the whole animal offering, called a holocaust. Usually, the best animal or best share of the animal is the one presented for offering.

Animal sacrifice should generally be distinguished from the religiously prescribed methods of ritual slaughter of animals for normal consumption as food.

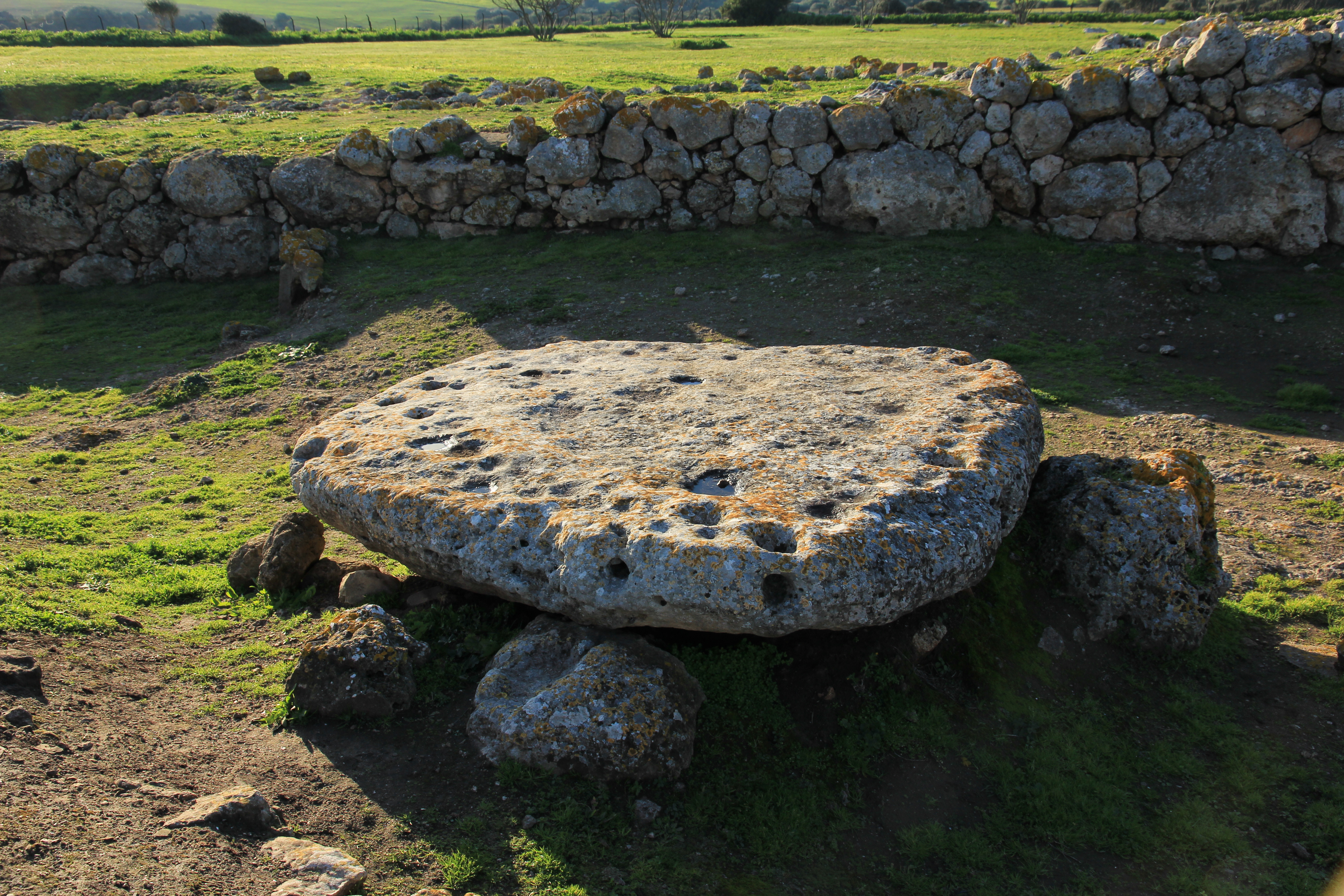
One of the altars at the Monte d'Accoddi in Sardinia, where animal sacrifice may have occurred.

During the Neolithic Revolution, early humans began to move from hunter-gatherer cultures toward agriculture, leading to the spread of animal domestication. In a theory presented in Homo Necans, mythologist Walter Burkert suggests that the ritual sacrifice of livestock may have developed as a continuation of ancient hunting rituals, as livestock replaced wild game in the food supply.

== Prehistory ==
Ancient Egypt was at the forefront of domestication, and some of the earliest archeological evidence suggesting animal sacrifice comes from Egypt. However, animal sacrifice was not a central practice of Egyptian religion, but was rather a peripherical occurrence that happened away from worshippers. The oldest Egyptian burial sites containing animal remains originate from the Badari culture of Upper Egypt, which flourished between 4400 and 4000 BCE. Sheep and goats were found buried in their own graves at one site, while at another site gazelles were found at the feet of several human burials. At a cemetery uncovered at Hierakonpolis and dated to 3000 BCE, the remains of a much wider variety of animals were found, including non-domestic species such as baboons and hippopotami, which may have been sacrificed in honor of powerful former citizens or buried near their former owners. According to Herodotus, later Dynastic Egyptian animal sacrifice became restricted to livestock – sheep, cattle, swine and geese – with sets of rituals and rules to describe each type of sacrifice.

By the end of the Copper Age in 3000 BCE, animal sacrifice had become a common practice across many cultures, and appeared to have become more generally restricted to domestic livestock. At Gath, archeological evidence indicates that the Canaanites imported sacrificial sheep and goats from Egypt rather than selecting from their own livestock. At the Monte d'Accoddi in Sardinia, one of the earliest known sacred centers in Europe, evidence of the sacrifice of sheep, cattle and swine has been uncovered by excavations, and it is indicated that ritual sacrifice may have been common across Italy around 3000 BCE and afterwards. At the Minoan settlement of Phaistos in ancient Crete, excavations have revealed basins for animal sacrifice dating to the period 2000 to 1700 BCE. However, remains of a young goat were found in Cueva de la Dehesilla (es), a cave in Spain, related to a funerary ritual from the Middle Neolithic period, dated to between 4800 and 4000 BCE.

== Ancient Near East ==
Animal sacrifice was general among the ancient Near Eastern civilizations of Ancient Mesopotamia, Egypt and Persia, as well as the Hebrews (covered below). Unlike the Greeks, who had worked out a justification for keeping the best edible parts of the sacrifice for the assembled humans to eat, in these cultures the whole animal was normally placed on the fire by the altar and burned, or sometimes it was buried.

== Ancient Greece ==
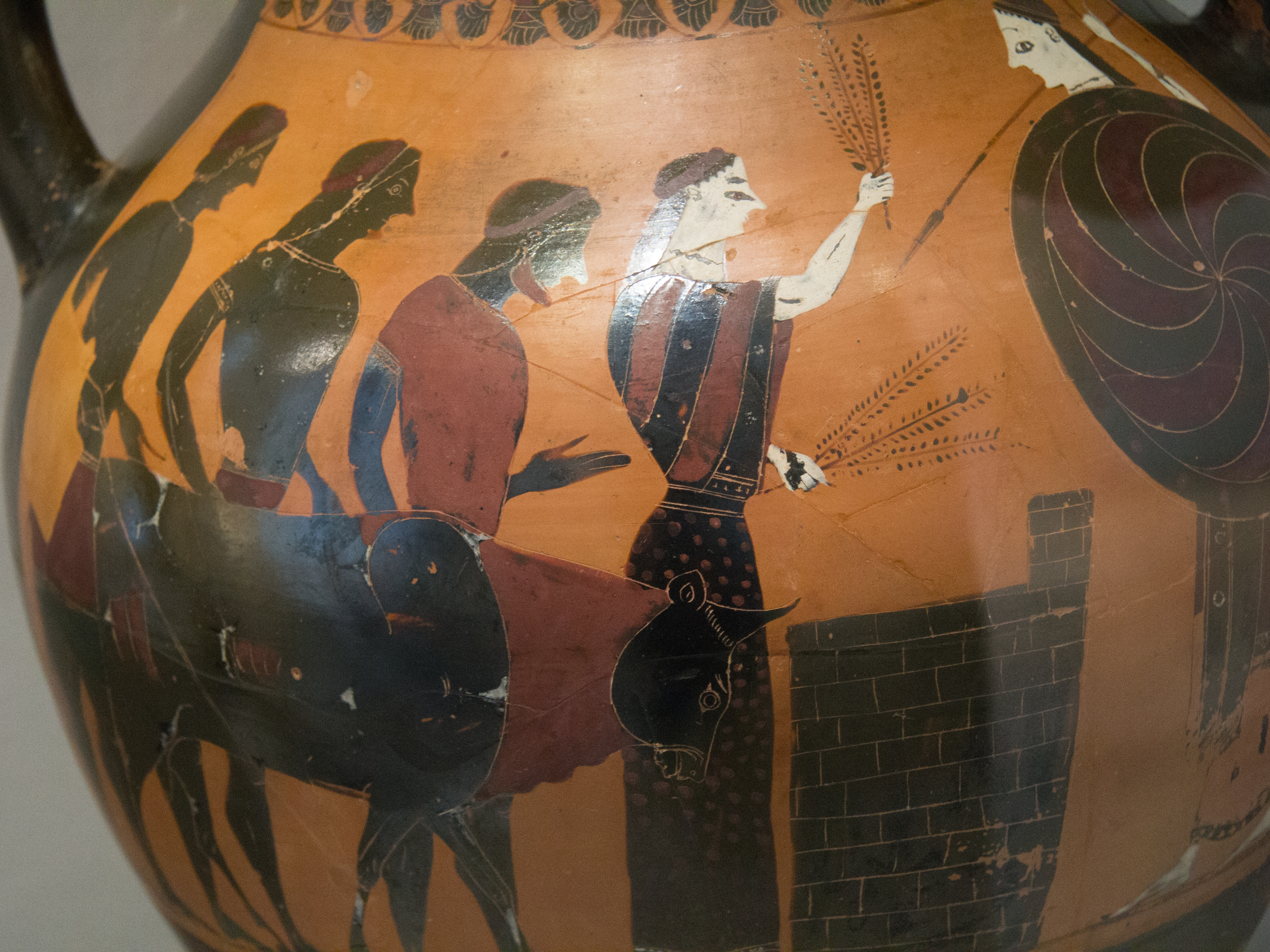
A bull is led to the altar of Athena, whose image is at right. Vase, c. 545 BCE.

Worship in ancient Greek religion typically consisted of sacrificing domestic animals at the altar with hymn and prayer. The altar was outside any temple building, and might not be associated with a temple at all. The animal, which should be perfect of its kind, is decorated with garlands and the like, and led in procession to the altar, a girl with a basket on her head containing the concealed knife leading the way. After various rituals the animal is slaughtered over the altar, as it falls all the women present "must cry out in high, shrill tones". Its blood is collected and poured over the altar. It is butchered on the spot and various internal organs, bones and other inedible parts burnt as the deity's portion of the offering, while the meat is removed to be prepared for the participants to eat; the leading figures tasting it on the spot. The temple usually kept the skin, to sell to tanners. The fact that the humans got more use from the sacrifice than the deity had not escaped the Greeks, and is often the subject of humour in Greek comedy.

The animals used are, in order of preference, bull or ox, cow, sheep (the most common), goat, pig (with piglet the cheapest mammal), and poultry (but rarely other birds or fish). Horses and asses are seen on some vases in the Geometric style (900–750 BCE), but are very rarely mentioned in literature; they were relatively late introductions to Greece, and it has been suggested that Greek preferences in this matter go very far back. The Greeks liked to believe that the animal was glad to be sacrificed, and interpreted various behaviours as showing this. Divination by examining parts of the sacrificed animal was much less important than in Roman or Etruscan religion, or Near Eastern religions, but was practiced, especially of the liver, and as part of the cult of Apollo. Generally, the Greeks put more faith in observing the behaviour of birds. For a smaller and simpler offering, a grain of incense could be thrown on the sacred fire, and outside the cities farmers made simple sacrificial gifts of plant produce as the "first fruits" were harvested. Although the grand form of sacrifice called the hecatomb (meaning 100 bulls) might in practice only involve a dozen or so, at large festivals the number of cattle sacrificed could run into the hundreds, and the numbers feasting on them well into the thousands. The enormous Hellenistic structures of the Altar of Hieron and Pergamon Altar were built for such occasions.

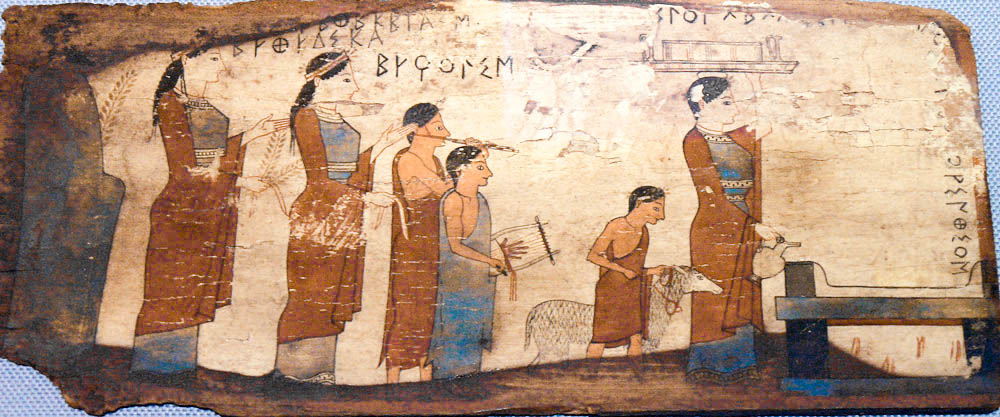
Sacrifice of a lamb on a Pitsa Panel, Corinth, 540–530 BCE

The evidence of the existence of such practices is clear in some ancient Greek literature, especially in Homer's epics. Throughout the poems, the use of the ritual is apparent at banquets where meat is served, in times of danger or before some important endeavor to gain the favor of the gods. For example, in Homer's Odyssey Eumaeus sacrifices a pig with prayer for his unrecognizable master Odysseus. However, in Homer's Iliad, which partly reflects very early Greek civilization, not every banquet of the princes begins with a sacrifice.

These sacrificial practices, described in these pre-Homeric eras, share commonalities to the 8th century forms of sacrificial rituals. Furthermore, throughout the poem, special banquets are held whenever gods indicated their presence by some sign or success in war. Before setting out for Troy, this type of animal sacrifice is offered. Odysseus offers Zeus a sacrificial ram in vain. The occasions of sacrifice in Homer's epic poems may shed some light onto the view of the gods as members of society, rather than as external entities, indicating social ties. Sacrificial rituals played a major role in forming the relationship between humans and the divine.

It has been suggested that the Chthonic deities, distinguished from Olympic deities by typically being offered the holocaust mode of sacrifice, where the offering is wholly burnt, may be remnants of the native Pre-Hellenic religion and that many of the Olympian deities may come from the Proto-Greeks who overran the southern part of the Balkan Peninsula in the late third millennium BCE.

In the Hellenistic period after the death of Alexander the Great in 323 BCE, several new philosophical movements began to question the ethics of animal sacrifice.

== Scythians ==
According to the unique account by the Greek author Herodotus (c. 484 – c. 425 BCE), the Scythians sacrificed various kinds of livestock, though the most prestigious offering was considered to be the horse. The pig, on the other hand, was never offered in sacrifice, and apparently the Scythians were loath to keep swine within their lands. Herodotus describes the Scythian manner of sacrifice as follows:

The victim stands with its fore-feet tied, and the sacrificing priest stands behind the victim, and by pulling the end of the cord he throws the beast down; and as the victim falls, he calls upon the god to whom he is sacrificing, and then at once throws a noose round its neck, and putting a small stick into it he turns it round and so strangles the animal, without either lighting a fire or making any first offering from the victim or pouring any libation over it: and when he has strangled it and flayed off the skin, he proceeds to boil it. [...] Then when the flesh is boiled, the sacrificer takes a first offering of the flesh and of the vital organs and casts it in front of him.

Herodotus goes on to describe the human sacrifice of prisoners, conducted in a different manner.

== Ancient Rome ==
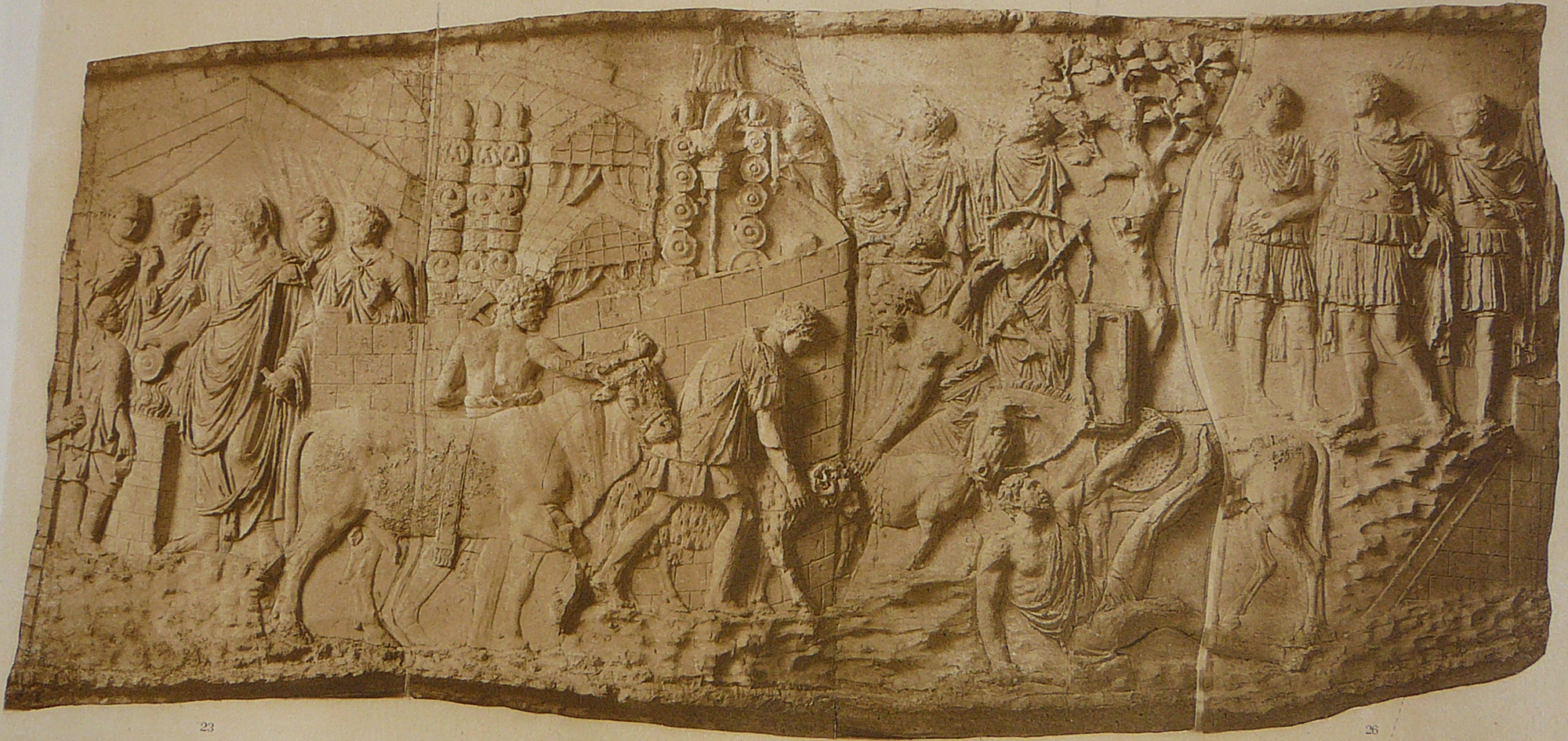
Procession of the suovetaurilia with the pig, sheep, and bull to be sacrificed, on a panel from Trajan's Column

The most potent offering in Ancient Roman religion was animal sacrifice, typically of domesticated animals such as cattle, sheep and pigs. Each was the best specimen of its kind, cleansed, clad in sacrificial regalia and garlanded; the horns of oxen might be gilded. Sacrifice sought the harmonisation of the earthly and divine, so the victim must seem willing to offer its own life on behalf of the community; it must remain calm and be quickly and cleanly dispatched.

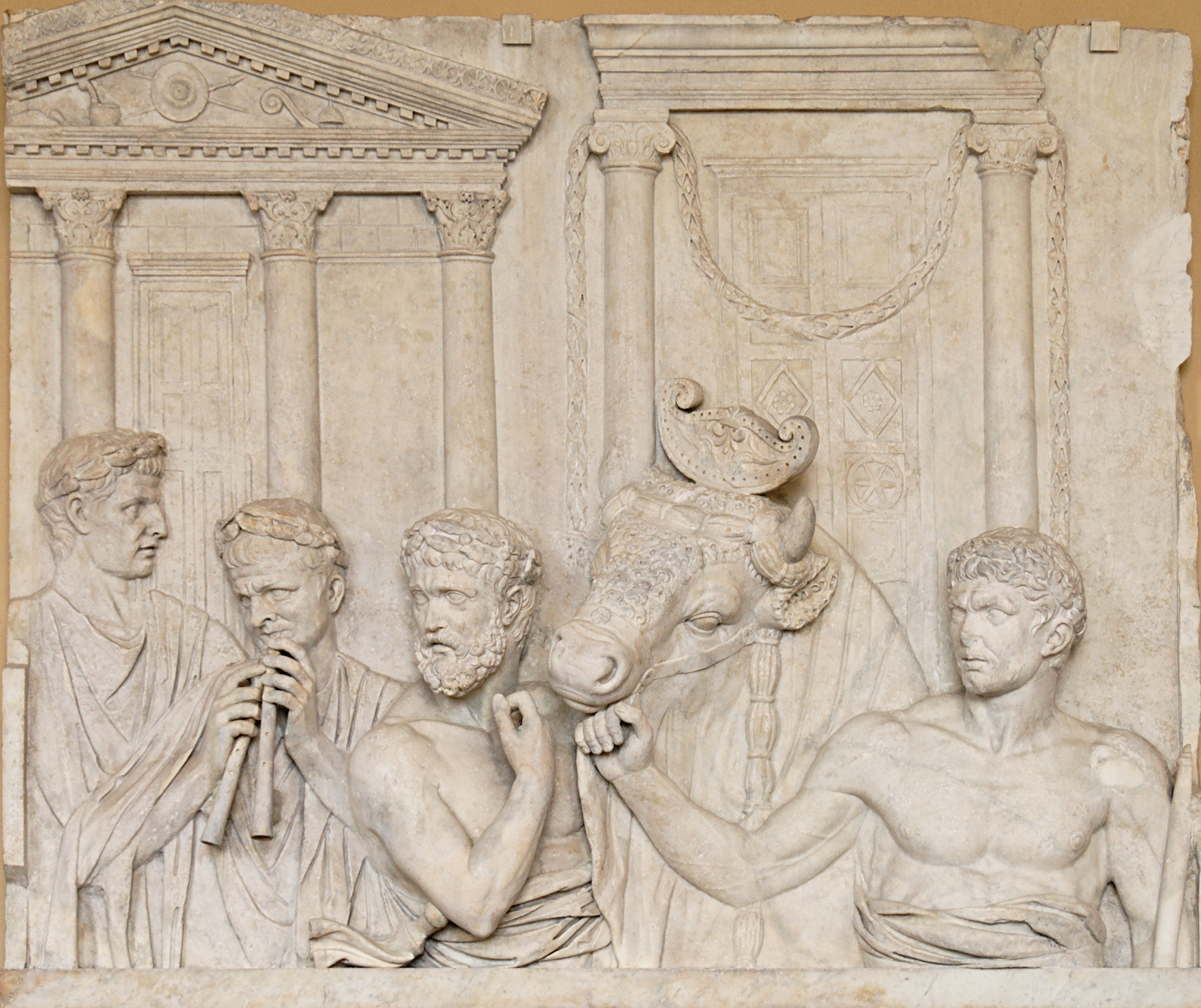
Preparation of an animal sacrifice; marble, fragment of an architectural relief, first quarter of the 2nd century AD; from Rome, Italy

Sacrifice to deities of the heavens (di superi, "gods above") was performed in daylight, and under the public gaze. Deities of the upper heavens required white, infertile victims of their own sex: Juno, a white heifer (possibly a white cow); Jupiter, a white, castrated ox (bos mas) for the annual oath-taking by the consuls. Di superi with strong connections to the earth, such as Mars, Janus, Neptune and various genii – including the Emperor's – were offered fertile victims. After the sacrifice, a banquet was held; in state cults, the images of honoured deities took pride of place on banqueting couches and by means of the sacrificial fire consumed their proper portion (exta, the innards). Rome's officials and priests reclined in order of precedence alongside and ate the meat; lesser citizens may have had to provide their own.

Chthonic gods such as Dis pater, the di inferi ("gods below"), and the collective shades of the departed (di Manes) were given dark, fertile victims in nighttime rituals. Animal sacrifice usually took the form of a holocaust or burnt offering, and there was no shared banquet, as "the living cannot share a meal with the dead". Ceres and other underworld goddesses of fruitfulness were sometimes offered pregnant female animals; Tellus was given a pregnant cow at the Fordicidia festival. Color had a general symbolic value for sacrifices. Demigods and heroes, who belonged to the heavens and the underworld, were sometimes given black-and-white victims. Robigo (or Robigus) was given red dogs and libations of red wine at the Robigalia for the protection of crops from blight and red mildew.

A sacrifice might be made in thanksgiving or as an expiation of a sacrilege or potential sacrilege (piaculum); a piaculum might also be offered as a sort of advance payment; the Arval Brethren, for instance, offered a piaculum before entering their sacred grove with an iron implement, which was forbidden, as well as after. The pig was a common victim for a piaculum.

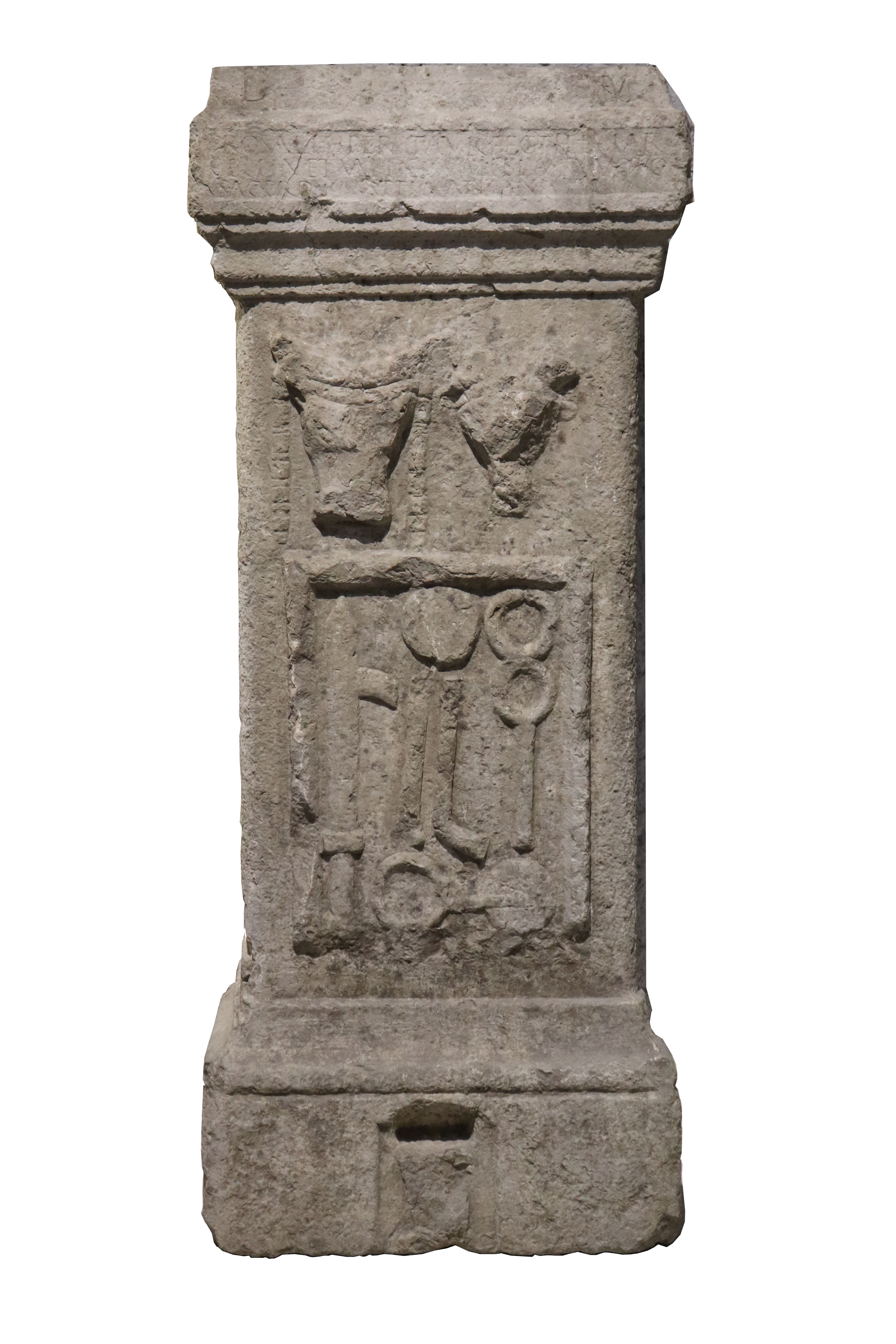
Taurobolium ex voto altar dedicated to the Mother of the Gods on behalf of the emperor's wellbeing, set up by a priest in Roman Gaul (CIL 12.1569

The same divine agencies who caused disease or harm also had the power to avert it, and so might be placated in advance. Divine consideration might be sought to avoid the inconvenient delays of a journey, or encounters with banditry, piracy and shipwreck, with due gratitude to be rendered on safe arrival or return. In times of great crisis, the Senate could decree collective public rites, in which Rome's citizens, including women and children, moved in procession from one temple to the next, supplicating the gods.

Extraordinary circumstances called for extraordinary sacrifice: in one of the many crises of the Second Punic War, Jupiter Capitolinus was promised every animal born that spring (see ver sacrum), to be rendered after five more years of protection from Hannibal and his allies. The "contract" with Jupiter is exceptionally detailed. All due care would be taken of the animals. If any died or were stolen before the scheduled sacrifice, they would count as already sacrificed, since they had already been consecrated. Normally, if the gods failed to keep their side of the bargain, the offered sacrifice would be withheld. In the imperial period, sacrifice was withheld following Trajan's death because the gods had not kept the Emperor safe for the stipulated period. In Pompeii, the Genius of the living emperor was offered a bull: presumably a standard practise in Imperial cult, though minor offerings (incense and wine) were also made.

The exta were the entrails of a sacrificed animal, comprising in Cicero's enumeration the gall bladder (fel), liver (iecur), heart (cor), and lungs (pulmones). The exta were exposed for litatio (divine approval) as part of Roman liturgy, but were "read" in the context of the disciplina Etrusca. As a product of Roman sacrifice, the exta and blood are reserved for the gods, while the meat (viscera) is shared among human beings in a communal meal. The exta of bovine victims were usually stewed in a pot (olla or aula), while those of sheep or pigs were grilled on skewers. When the deity's portion was cooked, it was sprinkled with mola salsa (ritually prepared salted flour) and wine, then placed in the fire on the altar for the offering; the technical verb for this action was porricere.

== Albanians ==
Animal sacrifices (Albanian: therim "ritual slaughering" and fli "sacrifice") have been common practices performed by Albanians during their feasts and ritual pilgrimages on mountain tops.

Animal sacrifices for new buildings is a pagan practice widespread among Albanians. At the beginning of the construction of the new house, the foundation traditionally starts with prayers, in a 'lucky day', facing the Sun (Dielli), starting after sunrise, during the growing Moon (Hëna), and an animal is slaughtered as a sacrifice. The practice continues with variations depending on the Albanian ethnographic area. For instance in Opojë the sacrificed animal is placed on the foundation, with its head placed towards the east, where the Sun rises. In Brataj the blood of the sacrificed animal is poured during the slaughter in the corner that was on the east side, where the Sun rises; in order for the house to stand and for good luck, the owner of the house throws silver or golden coins in the same corner of the house; the lady of the house throws there unwashed wool. These things are to remain buried in the foundation of the house that is being built. The relatives of the house owner throw money on the foundation of the house as well, but that money is taken by the craftsman who builds the house. In Dibra a ram is slaughtered at the foundation, and the head of the ram is placed on the foundation. In the Lezha highlands a ram or a rooster is slaughered on the foundation and then their heads are buried there; the owners of the house throw coins as well as seeds of different plants on the foundation.

On the occasion of the beginning of ploughing the wheat field, a chicken is slaughtered on the tail of the plough. The head of the chicken is mixed with the seed and the earth obtained from the first pass of the ploughing. Those animal sacrifices are made for soil fertility and production, prosperity, health of the animals, etc.

According to an old Albanian custom practiced until recently in various villages in Tomorr, Mirdita, and perhaps also in other areas, from the middle of May families with a lot of cattle slaughtered young cattle as sacrifices in order to make the earth fertile, so that the cattle would not be harmed during the summer and would have abundant milk during the harvest time in the mountains. Such a ritual burial ceremony was also found among other Balkan peoples, and it has been interpreted as a trace of the cult of an agricultural deity, for it was a sacrifice that allowed the renewal of the products of the soil, giving force to the vegetation of the fields, trees and vines.

== Celtic peoples ==
There is evidence that ancient Celtic people sacrificed animals, almost always livestock or working animals, as part of ancient Celtic religion. The idea seems to have been that ritually transferring a life-force to the Otherworld pleased the gods and established a channel of communication between the worlds. Animal sacrifices could be acts of thanksgiving, appeasement, to ensure good health and fertility, or as a means of divination. It seems that some animals were offered wholly to the gods (by burying or burning), while some were shared between gods and humans (part eaten and part set aside).

Archaeologists have found evidence of animal sacrifice at some Gaulish and British sanctuaries, and at the Irish site Uisneach. Accounts of Celtic animal sacrifice come from Roman and Greek writers. Julius Caesar and Strabo wrote of the Gauls burning animal sacrifices in a large wickerwork figure, known as a wicker man, while Pliny the Elder wrote of druids performing a 'ritual of oak and mistletoe' which involved sacrificing two white bulls.

Some animal sacrifice or ritual slaughter continued among Celtic peoples long after they converted to Christianity. Until the 19th century, on St. Martin's Day (11 November) in rural Ireland a rooster, goose or sheep would be slaughtered and some of its blood sprinkled on the threshold of the house. It was offered to Saint Martin, and was eaten as part of a feast. Bull sacrifices at the time of the Lughnasa festival were recorded as late as the 18th century at Cois Fharraige in Ireland (where they were offered to Crom Dubh) and at Loch Maree in Scotland (where they were offered to Saint Máel Ruba).

Many scholars believe that the Irish and Manx tradition of killing, elaborately displaying and burying a wren on Saint Stephen's Day is a survival of animal sacrifice (see Wren Day).

== Germanic peoples ==
Animal sacrifice, or blót, was an important ritual in Old Norse religion. The blood was sprinkled on altars, idols and the walls of temples. A blót was made at seasonal festivals as well as at funerals, before battles and perilous journeys, or after the conclusion of business between traders.

In the 11th century, Adam of Bremen wrote that human and animal sacrifices were made at the Temple at Gamla Uppsala in Sweden. He wrote that every ninth year, nine men and nine of every animal were sacrificed and their bodies hung in a sacred grove.

== Abrahamic traditions ==
=== Judaism ===
No modern denomination practices animal sacrifice. However, Judaism practiced the animal sacrifice until the destruction of the Second Temple. A qorban is any of a variety of sacrificial offerings described and commanded in the Torah. The most common usages are animal sacrifice (zevah זֶבַח), zevah shelamim (the peace offering) and olah (the burnt offering). A qorban was an animal sacrifice, such as a bull, sheep, goat, or a dove that underwent shechita (Jewish ritual slaughter). Sacrifices could also consist of grain, meal, wine, or incense.

The Hebrew Bible says that Yahweh commanded the Israelites to offer offerings and sacrifices on various altars. The sacrifices were only to be offered by the hands of the kohanim. Before building the Temple in Jerusalem, when the Israelites were in the desert, sacrifices were offered only in the Tabernacle. After building Solomon's Temple, sacrifices were allowed only there. After the Temple was destroyed, sacrifices was resumed when the Second Temple was built until it was also destroyed in 70 CE. After the destruction of the Second Temple sacrifices were prohibited because there was no longer a Temple, the only place allowed by Jewish law (halakha) for sacrifices. Offering of sacrifices was briefly reinstated during the Jewish–Roman wars of the second century CE and was continued in certain communities thereafter.

The Karaite Jews along with Samaritans, a group historically related to the Jews, practice animal sacrifice in accordance with the Law of Moses.

=== Christianity ===
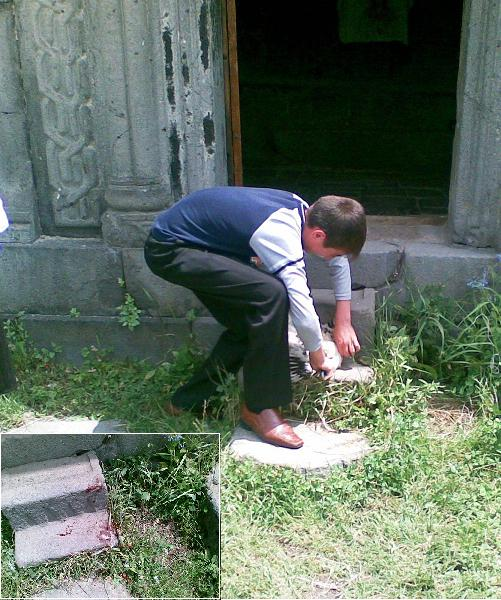
Matagh of a rooster at the entrance of a monastery church (Alaverdi, Armenia, 2009), with inset of bloody steps.

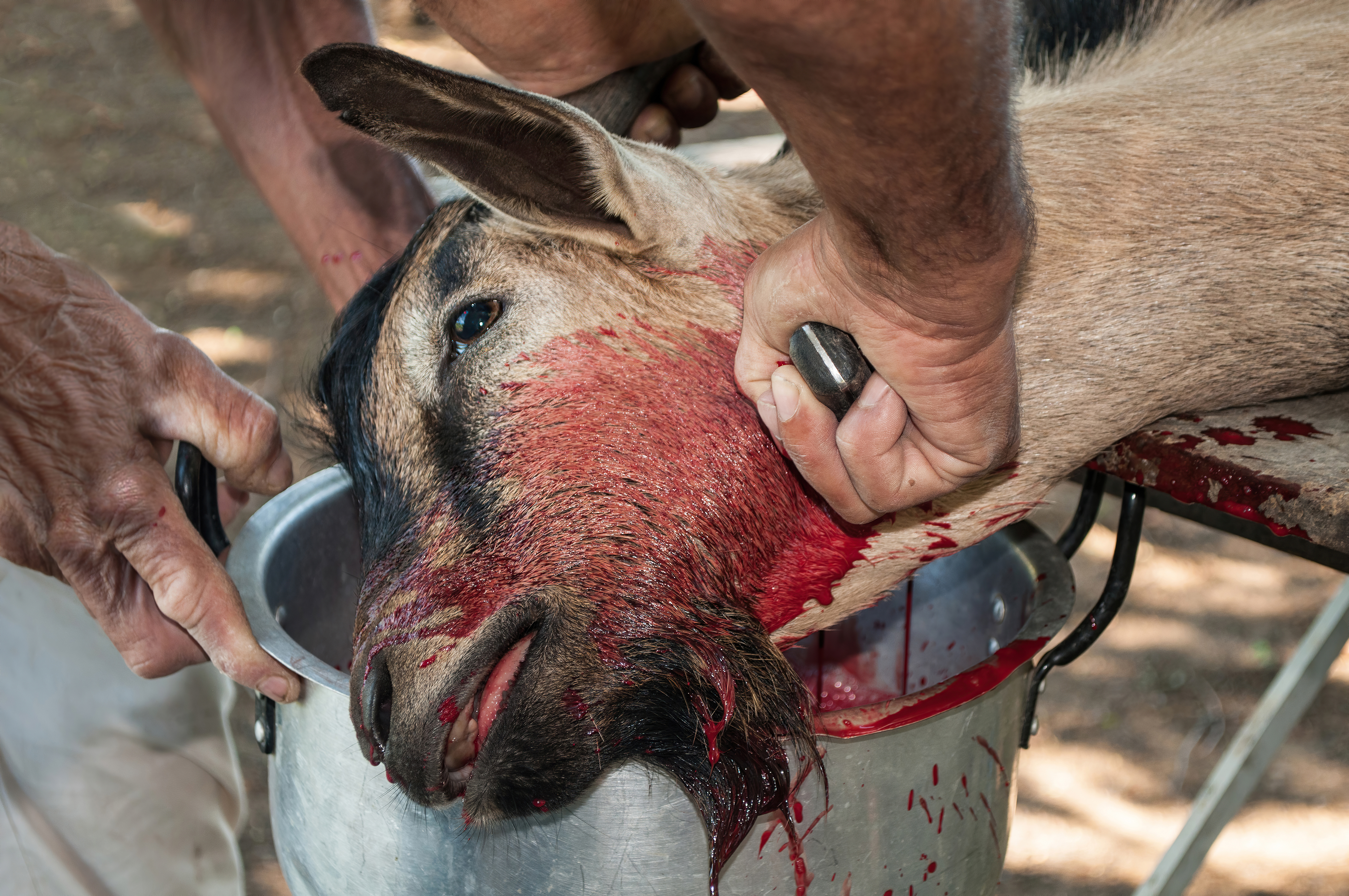
Christmas goat sacrifice in Isla de Margarita, Venezuela

Christianity has long opposed all forms of animal sacrifice, and the practice's "very possibility ... has been generally rejected as unreasonable and hostile to Christian theology". Most Christian denominations believe that the sacrificial death of Jesus Christ permanently abolished animal sacrifice, primarily based on the teaching in the Epistle to the Hebrews that Jesus was the "Lamb of God" to whom all ancient sacrifices pointed. Most Christians believe that the "bloodless" sacrifice of the Eucharist, or Lord's Supper, entirely replaces the Old Testament system of sacrifices. Consequently, animal sacrifice is rarely practiced in Christianity.

Some villages in Greece sacrifice animals to Orthodox saints in a practice known as kourbania. Sacrifice of a lamb, or less commonly a rooster, is a common practice in Armenian Church, and the Tewahedo Church of Ethiopia and Eritrea. This tradition, called matagh, is believed to stem from pre-Christian pagan rituals. Additionally, some Mayans following a form of Folk Catholicism in Mexico today still sacrifice animals in conjunction with church practices, a ritual practiced in past religions before the arrival of the Spaniards.

=== Islam ===
Muslims engaged in the Hajj (pilgrimage) are obliged to sacrifice a lamb or a goat or join others in sacrificing a cow or a camel during the celebration of the Eid al-Adha, an Arabic term that means "Feast of Sacrifice", also known as al-Id al-Kabir (Great Feast), or Qurban Bayrami (Sacrifice Feast) in Turkic influenced cultures, Bakar Id (Goat Feast) in Indian subcontinent and Reraya Qurben in Indonesia. Other Muslims not on the Hajj to Mecca also participate in this sacrifice wherever they are, on the 10th day of the 12th lunar month in the Islamic calendar. It is understood as a symbolic re-enactment of Abraham's sacrifice of a ram in place of his son. Meat from this occasion is divided into three parts, one part is kept by the sacrificing family for food, the other gifted to friends and family, and the third given to the poor Muslims. The sacrificed animal is a sheep, goat, cow or camel. The feast follows a communal prayer at a mosque or open air.

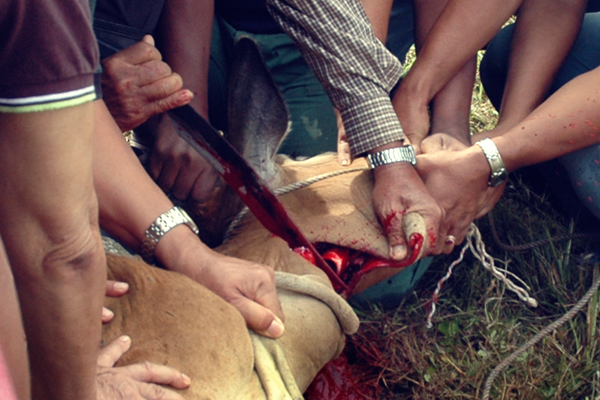
Cattle sacrifice at Eid.

The animal sacrifice during the Hajj is a part of nine step pilgrimage ritual. It is, states Campo, preceded by a statement to intention and body purification, inaugural circumambulation of the Kaaba seven times, running between Marwa and Safa hills, encampment at Mina, standing in Arafat, stoning the three Mina satanic pillars with at least forty nine pebbles. Thereafter, animal sacrifice, and this is followed by farewell circumambulation of the Kaaba. The Muslims who are not on Hajj also perform a simplified ritual animal sacrifice. According to Campo, the animal sacrifice at the annual Islamic festival has origins in western Arabia in vogue before Islam. The animal sacrifice, states Philip Stewart, is not required by the Quran, but is based on interpretations of other Islamic texts.

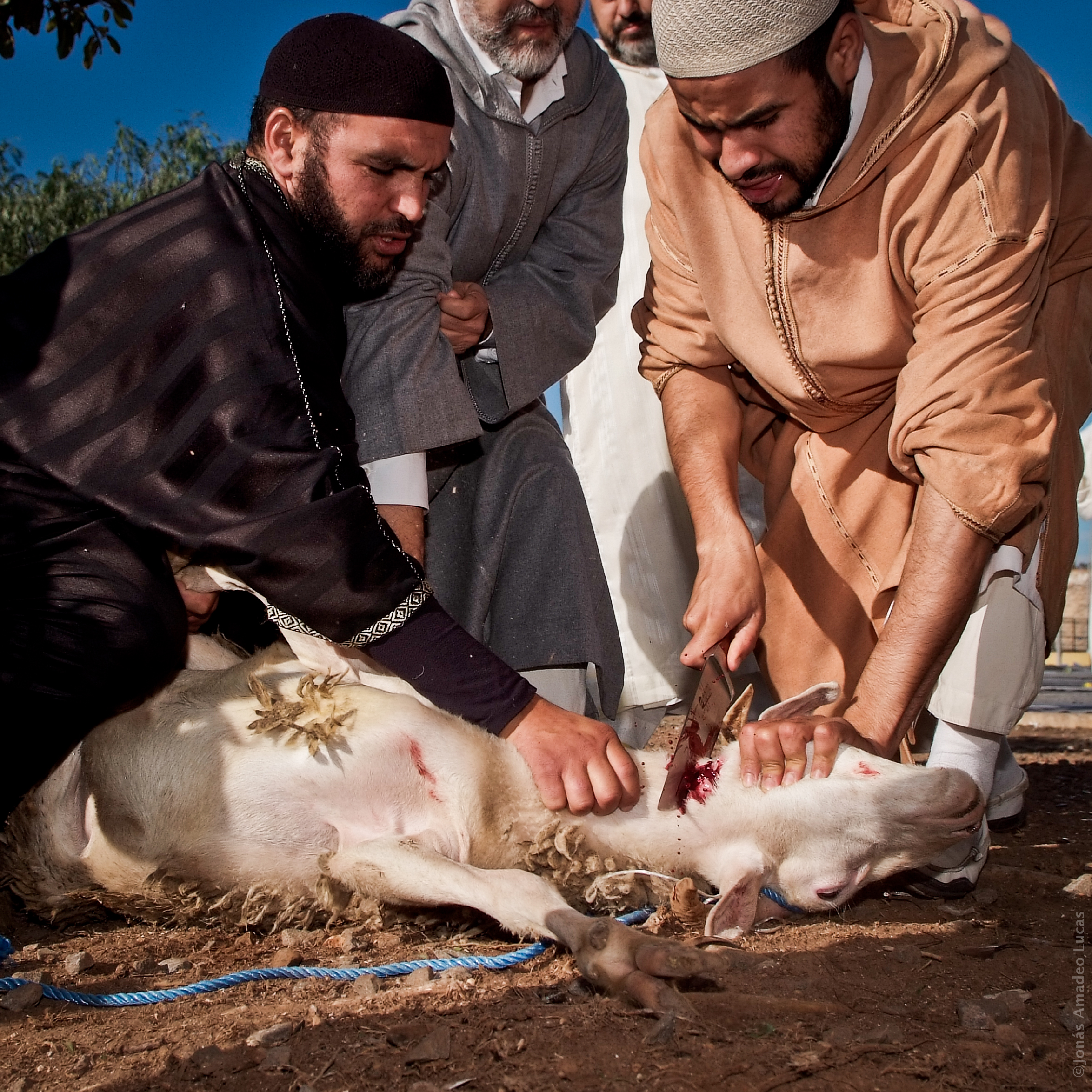
Goat sacrifice.

The Eid al-Adha is major annual festival of animal sacrifice in Islam. In Indonesia alone, for example, some 800,000 animals were sacrificed in 2014 by its Muslims on the festival, but the number can be a bit lower or higher depending on the economic conditions. According to Lesley Hazleton, in Turkey about 2,500,000 sheep, cows and goats are sacrificed each year to observe the Islamic festival of animal sacrifice, with a part of the sacrificed animal given to the needy who did not sacrifice an animal. According to The Independent, nearly 10,000,000 animals are sacrificed in Pakistan every year on Eid. Countries such as Saudi Arabia transport nearly a million animals every year for sacrifice to Mina (near Mecca). The sacrificed animals at Id al-Adha, states Clarke Brooke, include the four species considered lawful for the Hajj sacrifice: sheep, goats, camels and cattle, and additionally, cow-like animals initialing the water buffalo, domesticated banteng and yaks. Many are brought in from north Africa and parts of Asia.

Other occasions when Muslims perform animal sacrifice include the 'aqiqa, when a child is seven days old, is shaved and given a name. It is believed that the animal sacrifice binds the child to Islam and offers protection to the child from evil.

Killing of animals by dhabihah is ritual slaughter rather than sacrifice.

== Hinduism ==
Practices of Hindu animal sacrifice are mostly associated with Shaktism, Shaiva Agamas and in currents of folk Hinduism called Kulamarga strongly rooted in local tribal traditions. Animal sacrifices were carried out in ancient times in India. Most Puranas and other scriptures forbid animal sacrifice though the upapurana, Kalika Purana, describes it in detail. In ancient India, horse sacrifice was part of a Vedic ritual called the Ashvamedha. It was performed by powerful kings to show their authority. A horse was allowed to roam freely for a year, guarded by soldiers. After its return, the horse was ritually sacrificed as an offering to the gods.

=== Shaktism traditions ===
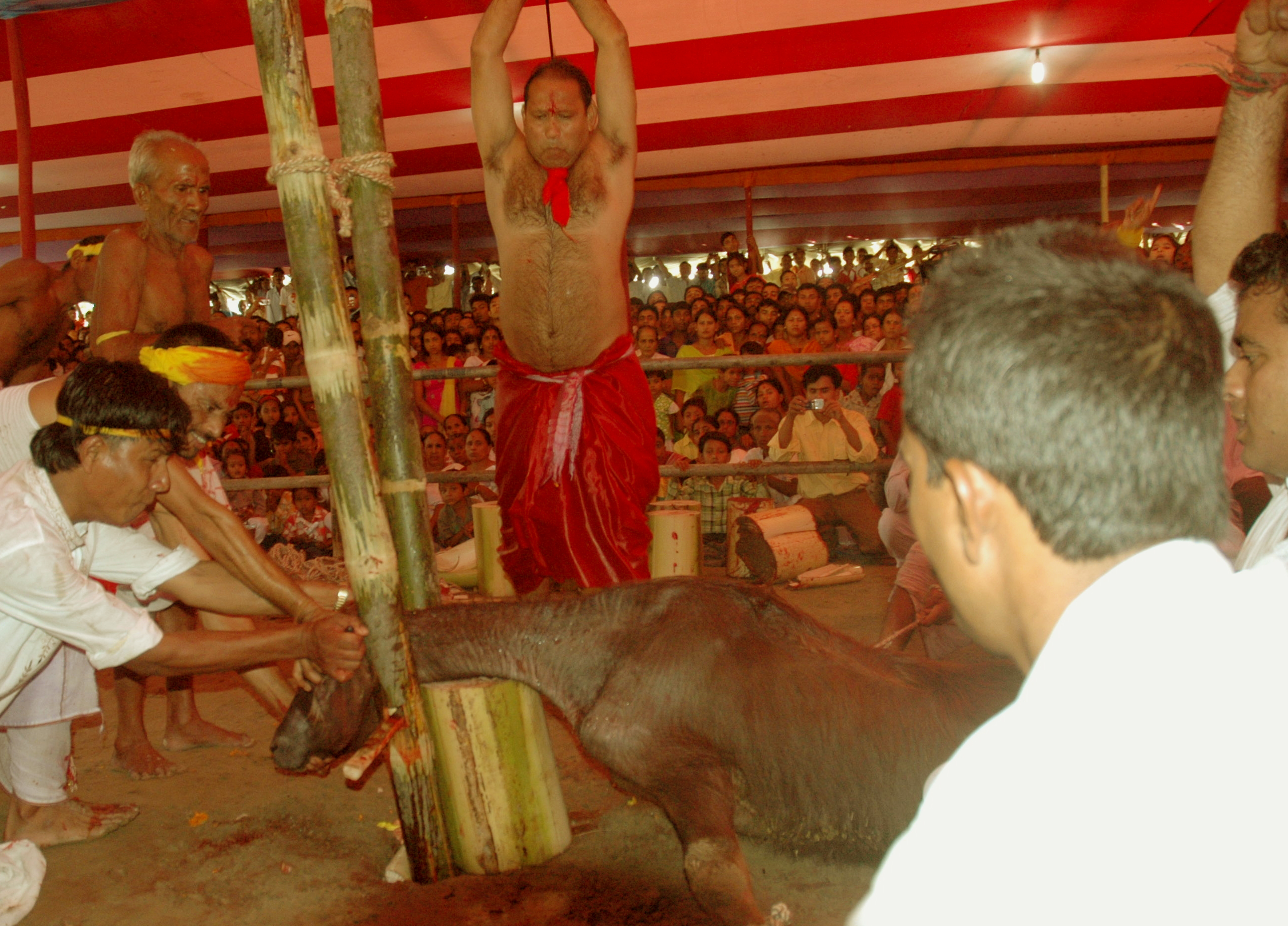
A male buffalo calf about to be sacrificed by a priest in the Durga Puja festival. The buffalo sacrifice practice, however, is rare in contemporary India.

Animal sacrifices are performed mainly at temples following the Shakti school of Hinduism where the female nature of Brahman is worshipped in the form of Kali and Durga. These traditions are followed in parts of eastern states of India at Hindu temples in Assam and West Bengal India and Nepal where goats, chickens and sometimes water buffalos are sacrificed.

Animal sacrifice is a part of Durga puja celebrations during the Navratri in eastern states of India. The goddess is offered sacrificial animal in this ritual in the belief that it stimulates her violent vengeance against the buffalo demon. According to Christopher Fuller, the animal sacrifice practice is rare among Hindus during Navratri, or at other times, outside the Shaktism tradition found in the eastern Indian states of West Bengal, Odisha and Assam. Further, even in these states, the festival season is one where significant animal sacrifices are observed. In some Shakta Hindu communities, the slaying of buffalo demon and victory of Durga is observed with a symbolic sacrifice instead of animal sacrifice. (Note: In these cases, Shaktism devotees consider animal sacrifice distasteful, practice alternate means of expressing devotion while respecting the views of others in their tradition. A statue of asura demon made of flour, or equivalent, is immolated and smeared with vermilion to remember the blood that had necessarily been spilled during the war. Other substitutes include a vegetal or sweet dish considered equivalent to the animal.)

Animal sacrifice en masse occurs during the three-day-long Gadhimai festival in Nepal. In 2009 it was speculated that more than 250,000 animals were killed while 5 million devotees attended the festival. However, this practise was later banned in 2015.

=== Rajput traditions ===
The Rajputs of Rajasthan worship their weapons and horses on Navaratri, and formerly offered a sacrifice of a goat to a goddess revered as kuladevi – a practice that continues in some places. The ritual requires slaying of the animal with a single stroke. In the past this ritual was considered a rite of passage into manhood and readiness as a warrior. The kuladevi among these Rajput communities is a warrior-pativrata guardian goddess, with local legends tracing reverence for her during Rajput-Muslim wars.

The tradition of animal sacrifice is being substituted with vegetarian offerings to the goddess in temples and households around Varanasi in Northern India.

=== Folk traditions ===
In some sacred groves of India, particularly in western Maharashtra, animal sacrifice is practiced to pacify female deities that are supposed to rule the groves.

In India, ritual of animal sacrifice is practised in many villages before local deities or certain powerful and terrifying forms of the Devi. In this form of worship, animals, usually goats, are decapitated and the blood is offered to deity often by smearing some of it on a post outside the temple. For instance, Kandhen Budhi is the reigning deity of Kantamal in Boudh district of Orissa, India. Every year, animals like goat and fowl are sacrificed before the deity on the occasion of her annual Yatra/Jatra (festival) held in the month of Aswina (September–October). The main attraction of Kandhen Budhi Yatra is Ghusuri Puja. Ghusuri means a child pig, which is sacrificed to the goddess every three years. Kandhen Budhi is also worshipped at Lather village under Mohangiri GP in Kalahandi district of Orissa, India. (Pasayat, 2009:20–24).

The religious belief of Tabuh Rah, a form of animal sacrifice of Balinese Hinduism includes a religious cockfight where a rooster is used in religious custom by allowing him to fight against another rooster in a religious and spiritual cockfight, a spiritual appeasement exercise of Tabuh Rah. The spilling of blood is necessary as purification to appease the evil spirits, and ritual fights follow an ancient and complex ritual as set out in the sacred lontar manuscripts.

=== Tantrik traditions ===
Human sacrifice is also mentioned in Hinduism in the Kalika Purana. Chapters 67 through 78 of the text constitute the Rudhiradhyaya, which discusses bali (animal sacrifice) and of Vamacara Tantrism. The Rudhiradhyaya section is notable for its uncommon discussion of human sacrifice. The text states that a human sacrifice may be performed to please the goddess, but only with the consent of prince before a war or cases of imminent danger. However, it was not until 2014 that the National Crime Records Bureau (NCRB) started collecting data on human sacrifice. According to the bureau, there were 51 cases of human sacrifice spread across 14 states between 2014 and 2016. An alleged case of human sacrifice was recorded as late as 2020.

== East Asian traditions ==
=== Han Chinese ===
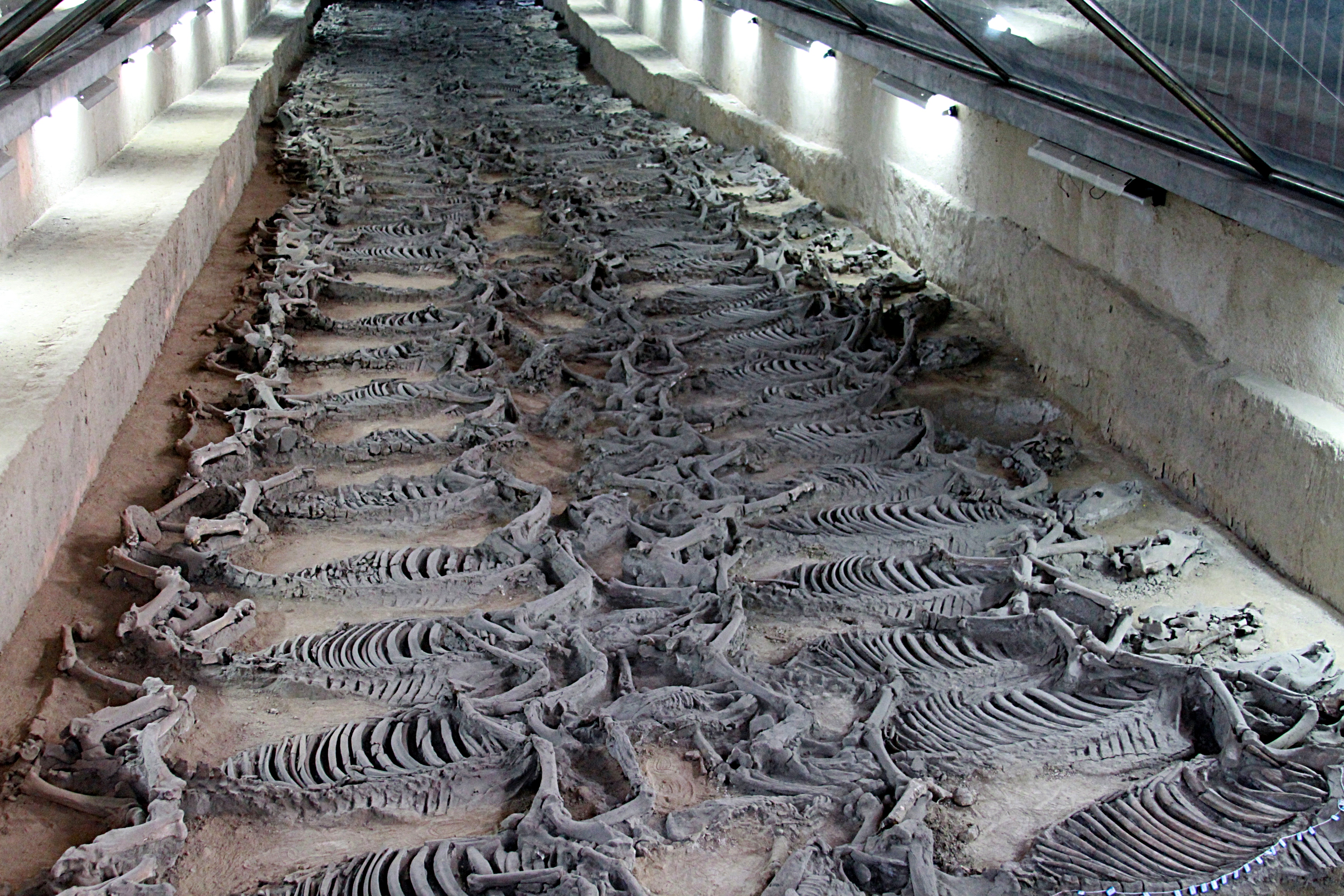
The burial pit of a mass sacrifice of 145 horses in Zibo, Shandong, likely from the funeral of the Jing Duke of Qi in 490 BC

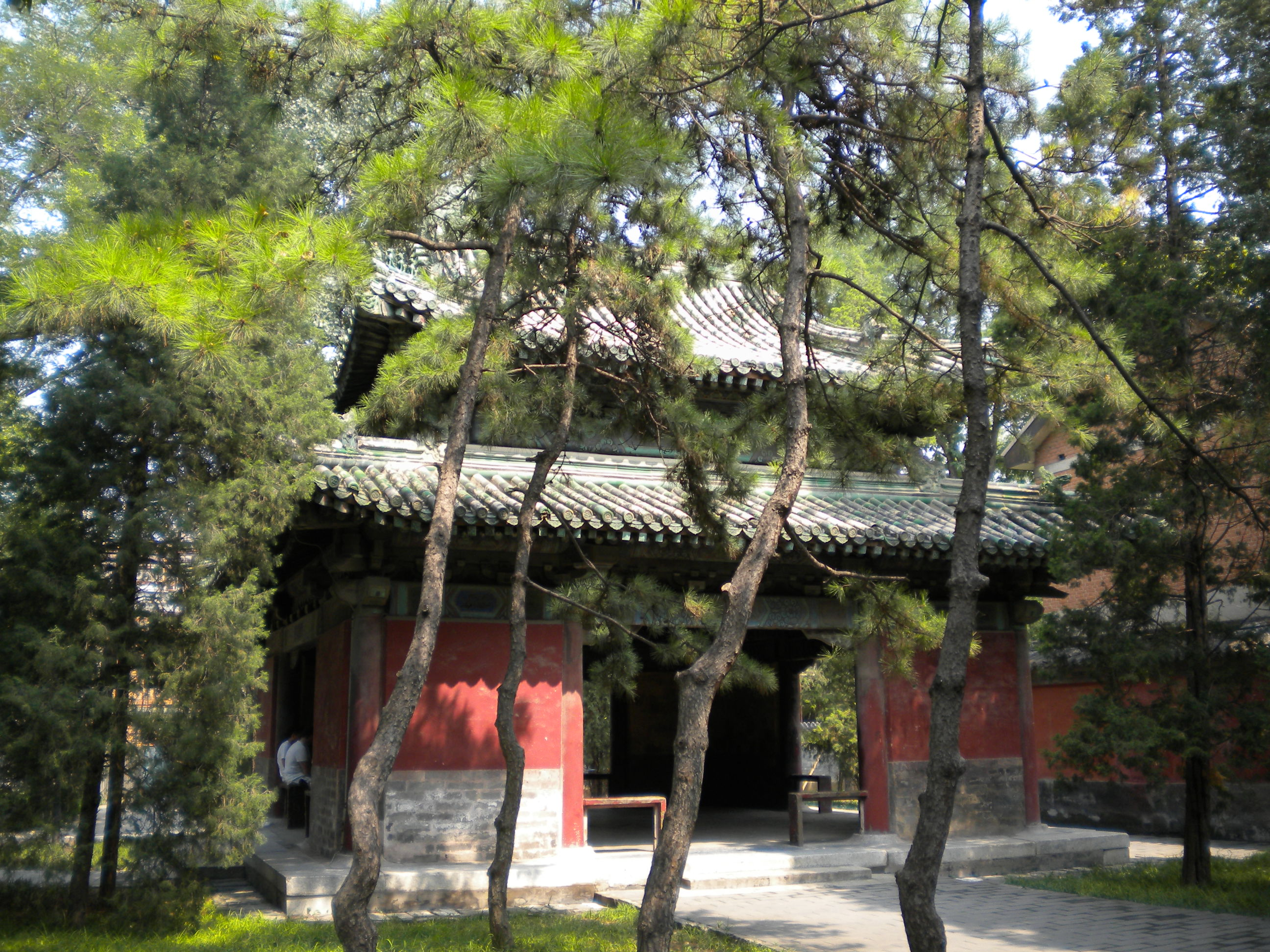
The Pavilion of Animal Sacrifice at the Temple of the Sun in Beijing

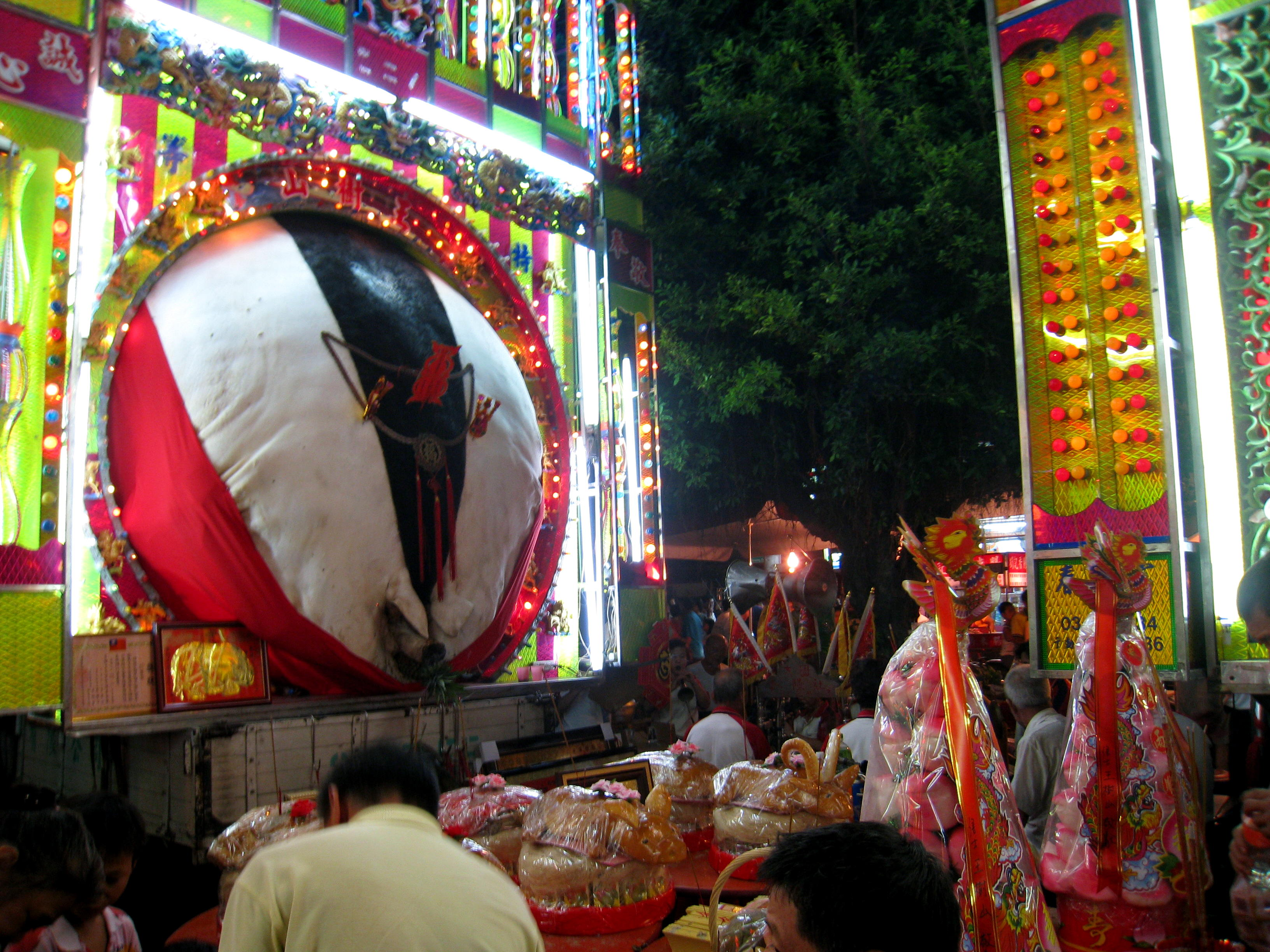
A sacrificed pig on a Taoyuan altar during the Ghost Festival

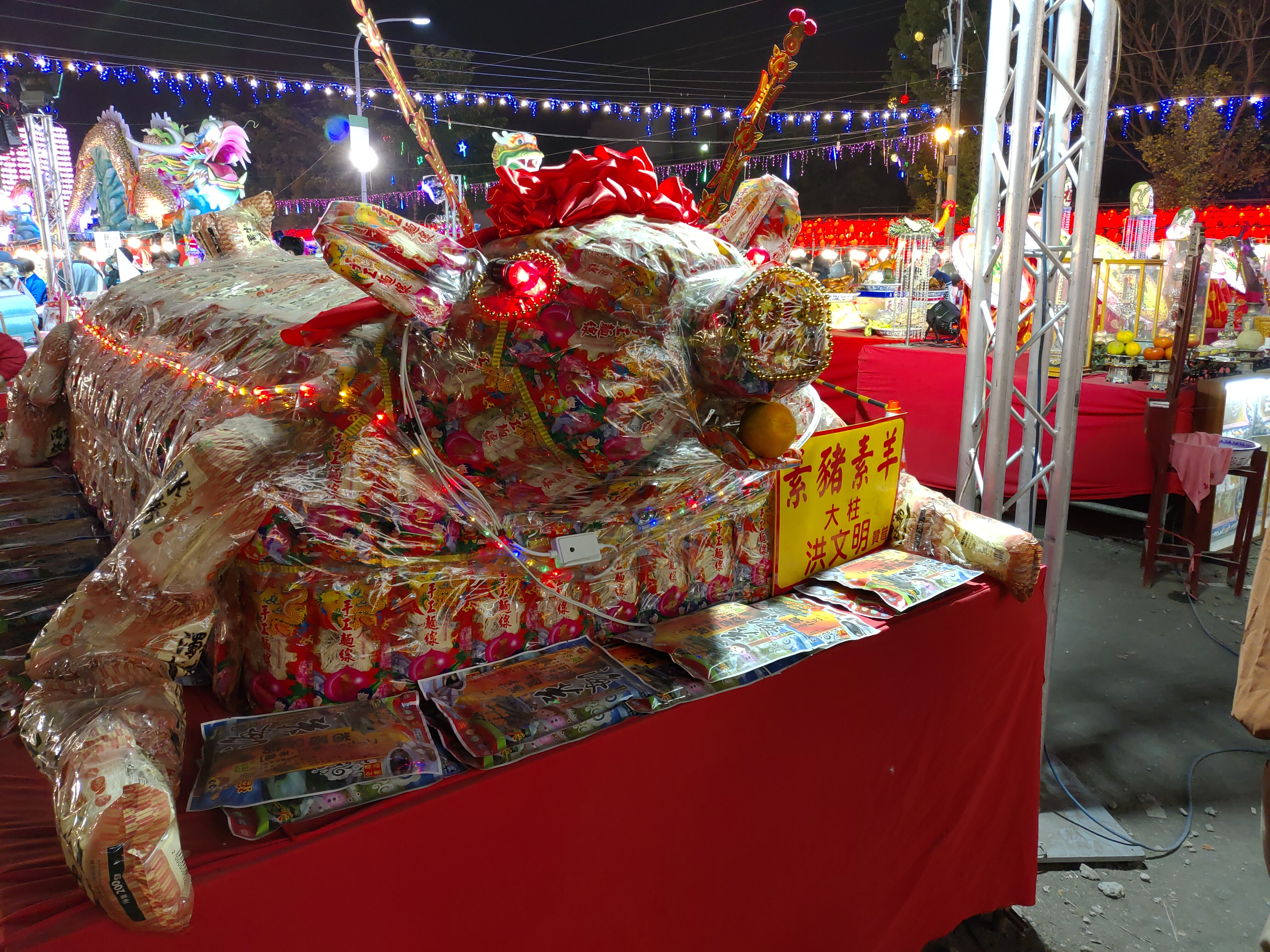
A dummy pig made of packs of noodles, offered as a sacrifice in Nantou, Taiwan.

During Shang and Zhou dynasties, the nobles used to practice a complicated and hierarchical sacrificial system as part of traditional Chinese religion. Theoretically, only the high king could sacrifice directly to Heaven and Earth, sacrifice at the Five Sacred Mountains including Mount Tai, or sacrifice to his ancestors with the Nine Tripod Cauldrons. The Dukes sacrificed at the altar of land and grain and to spirits of the various major parts of the landscape in their territory and at their family temples. Commoners did not have personal or communal temples but sacrificed to their father, grandfather, or other important ancestors at home.

Under the Shang, members of the royalty and nobility would sacrifice people, horses, cattle (particularly oxen), goats and sheep, pigs and boars, dogs, and other livestock for different purposes and at different times of year.

By the late Zhou, nearly every school of Chinese thought opposed human sacrifice, putting more emphasis on specific or grander forms of animal sacrifice for important rituals. The Confucian classics the Rites and the Etiquette and Ceremonial—notionally recording the earliest Zhou rites in honor of Heaven but only surviving in much later editions—record how the era viewed proper ritual. The names of the offering scales from honorable to low were Tailao (太牢, "Supreme Victims"), Shaolao (少牢, "Lesser Victims"), Tesheng (特牲), Teshi (特豕), Tetun (特豚), Yu (魚, "fish"), La (臘), Dou (豆, "beans"), and other offerings. Similar to the Roman suovetaurilia, the highest Tailao class—reserved for the king—consisted of offering sets of all of the "Three Sacrificial Beasts": an ox, a sheep, and a pig. Traditionally, the upper nobility were limited to offering only a sheep and pig during their rites, while minor officials were restricted to offering only a pig. Animals offered for sacrifice were required to be whole, healthy, and of uniform color. Commoners were notionally restricted to offering grains and crops. One of Confucius's few official posts was overseer of Lu's state cattle (including those used for sacrifice) and many of his specific complaints about the societal disorder of his time related to the gradual encroachments on these traditions and privileges, particularly Feng and Shan sacrifices performed at Mount Tai by the ambitious dukes of Qi and Lu. Such usurpation of established rituals was a visible manifestation of the collapse of the Zhou and the various dukes' proclamations of their own royal status. Large-scale sacrifice also accompanied many royal and noble funerals, as with the great horse pit in Zibo, Shandong. Commoners themselves gradually began to use more animals in their worship, including chickens, fish, and pigs.

State support for Confucianism under the Han was so pronounced that it finally permitted the nobility and commoners to perform the Tailou, provided that it was offered during formal rites in Confucius's honor. However, the rise of Chinese Buddhism during the Han, Three Kingdoms, and Jin spread its opposition to all forms of killing. In time, Taoism also greatly restricted its use of animal sacrifice as well. Annual sacrifices at the Temple of Heaven in the capital, however, remained one of the primary signifiers of imperial status up to Yuan Shikai's abortive attempt to found a new dynasty after the fall of the Qing.

Some animal offerings, such as fowl, pigs, goats, fish, or other livestock, are accepted in some Taoism sects and beliefs in Chinese folk religion. The offerings would be placed at the altar or the temple after being slaughtered. The amount sacrificed is up to the worshippers, who can eat all of the offerings after the rite. In folk religion some regions believe that high-status deities prefer vegetarian food more, while ghosts, low-status gods, and other unknown supernatural spirits like meat. Therefore, whole pigs, whole goats, whole chickens, and whole ducks will be sacrificed during the Ghost Festival. Some vegetarian believers make dummy pigs or dummy goats from vegetarian food like bread or rice for sacrifice.

On Taiwan, Tailao is still practiced but now only in ceremonies venerating the Yellow Emperor or Confucius. In Kaohsiung, however, animal sacrifices are banned at its Taoist temples.

=== Japan ===
Before Buddhism came to Japan, some Shinto festivals included bear, deer, horse, and green pheasant sacrifice. Iomante (イオマンテ), sometimes written as Iyomante (イヨマンテ), is an Ainu ceremony in which a brown bear is sacrificed.

== Traditional Sub-Saharan and Afro-American religions ==
Animal sacrifice is regularly practiced in traditional African and Afro-American religions.

The U.S. Supreme Court's 1993 decision Church of Lukumi Babalu Aye v. City of Hialeah upheld the right of Santería adherents to practice ritual animal sacrifice in the United States of America. Likewise in Texas in 2009, legal and religious issues that related to animal sacrifice, animal rights and freedom of religion were taken to the 5th U.S. Circuit Court of Appeals in the case of Jose Merced, President Templo Yoruba Omo Orisha Texas, Inc., v. City of Euless. The court ruling that the Merced case of the freedom of exercise of religion was meritorious and prevailing and that Merced was entitled under the Texas Religious Freedom and Restoration Act (TRFRA) to an injunction preventing the city of Euless, Texas from enforcing its ordinances that burdened his religious practices relating to the use of animals (see Tex. Civ. Prac. & Rem. Code § 110.005(a)(2)).

== Austronesian ==
=== Utux ===
In Taiwan, the indigenous peoples Atayal, Seediq and Taroko believe in bad-luck or punishments of 'Utux', which refers to any kind of supernatural spirits or ancestors, would infect the relatives. When a member in relatives has violated a taboo or met with misfortune, a ritual will be held to sacrifice a pig. It is believed the sin would be washed away by the blood, and the ceremony apologizes to the Utux with a gift.

== See also ==
- Animal welfare
- Animal worship
- Anthrozoology
- Bans on ritual slaughter
- Folk religion
- Human sacrifice
- Religious abuse
- Self-flagellation
- Self-mutilation
- Slaughter offering
