= Dušni Brav =

Practice of Christianized animal sacrifices amongst the Serbian Orthodox

Dušni Brav (Serbian Cyrillic: душни брав; "Soul Ram" (also referred to as Dušno)); refers to a practice of Christianized animal sacrifices amongst the Serbian Orthodox. It involves the ritualistic slaughter of a lamb for a funeral feast (Daća).

It is believed that the sacrifice of the Dušni Brav is meant to pacify and appease the departed's soul.

The practice involves the blood sacrifice of a sheep (душни брав, dušni brav) to the soul of the deceased. The animal is slaughtered in the deceased's backyard or property, usually half-year after the funeral ("daća") or year anniversary (годишњица, "godišnjica"). The place of burial of sheep remains (guts, skin and bones) is usually marked by planting a tree on top of it, so that it wouldn't be stepped on. The sheep must be the same gender as the deceased, and one year old (may be older, but not younger). No other animal but a white sheep may be sacrificed.

Before the sacrifice, a white cloth is put on top of the sacrificial sheep and a candle is lit. After the sacrifice, the sheep is cooked, usually boiled together with bones until the meat starts separating from the bones. The meat is then removed from the bones and chopped with fingers and the white cloth is placed upon it again and it is served with koliva and special pogača at the daća (half-year feast). The bones are buried together with skin and guts, while the water in which the meat was cooked is used for preparing a cabbage soup that is served after the service. Before eating the dušni brav it is proper etiquette to cross oneself.

== See also ==
- Animal sacrifice
- Kourbania, lambs sacrificed to saints, in Greece
- Matagh, lambs or roosters sacrificed to God, in Armenia
- Qurban, animal sacrifice in Islam
