= Kourbania =

Christianized animal sacrifices in some parts of Greece

Kourbania (Greek: το κουρμπάνι, pl. -ια from Turkish: kurban and ultimately from Arabic: قربان, romanized: qurbān, sacrificial rite analogous to Jewish qorban) is a Christianized animal sacrifice in parts of Greece. It usually involves the slaughter of lambs as "kourbania" offerings to saints.

In antiquity the sacrifice was offered for health or following an accident or illness, as a votive offering promised to the Lord by the community, or by the relatives of the victim. Writing in 1979, Stella Georgoudi stated that the custom survived in "some villages of modern Greece" and was "slowly deteriorating and dying out".

A similar custom from North Macedonia and Bulgaria known as kurban is celebrated on St. George's day.

== Description ==
The practice involves the blood sacrifice (θυσία, thusia) of a domestic animal to either a saint, taken as the tutelary of the village in question, or dedicated to the Holy Trinity or the Virgin. The animal is slaughtered outside the village church, during or after the Divine Liturgy, or on the eve of the feast day. The animal is sometimes led into the church before the icon of the saint, or even locked in the church during the night preceding the sacrifice. Most of the kourbania are spread between April and October.

The descriptions (for both the Byzantine and Turkish periods) of this θυσία, or kurban (in Turkish), are numerous indeed, and are an example of one popular element which the Turks adopted from Byzantium. The most detailed description is given by the sixteenth-century Turkish slave Bartholomaeus Gourgieuiz:

"The Manner of their (the Turks') sacrifice.
In the time of anye disease or peril, they promise in certaine places to sacrifice either a Shepe or Oxe; after that the vowed offering is not burned, like unto a beast killed and layed on the aulter, as the custome was among the Jewes, but after that the beast is slaine, the skinne, head, feete, and fourthe parte of the flesh are gene unto the prest, an other part to poore people, and the thirde unto their neighbours. The killers of the sacrifice doo make readye the other fragmentes for the sleves and their compaynions to feede on. Neyther are they bound to performe the vow, if they have not bene delivered from the possessed disease or peril. For all things with them are done condytionallye I will geve if thou willte graunt. The lyke worshyppinge of God is observed among the Gretians, Armenians, and other realmes in Asia imitating yet y Christian religio."

=== In Cappadocia (Anatolia) ===
In the late nineteenth century, Greek Christians of the village of Zele (Sylata) in Cappadocia sacrificed animals to Saint Charalambos especially in time of illness. Though the Greeks frequently referred to these sacrifices by the Turkish term Kurban, the sacrificial practices went back to Byzantine and pagan times as is evident from several factors. They frequently referred to these sacrifices by the ancient Greek terms θυσία and θάλι. The question of Christian borrowing from the Muslim Kurban sacrifice is probably restricted to the philological aspect, for the pagan sacrifice seems to have remained very lively and widespread in Byzantine times.

=== In Heracleopolis (Anatolia) ===
One of the most spectacular examples of its existence in Byzantine Anatolia was the sacrifice of the fawn to St. Athenogenes at Pedachthoe/Heracleopolis on July 17 (July 16). On that day the young animal and its mother passed before the altar of the monastery church of St. Athenogenes while the Gospels were being read. The fawn was sacrificed, cooked, and eaten by the congregation and thus the faithful celebrated the glory of the martyred saint. The pagan usage of animal sacrifice survived also in the Byzantine practice of slaughtering and roasting animals after the celebration of ecclesiastical festivals.

=== In Lesbos ===
In the village of Mistegna on Lesbos, the kourbania is to the Akindinoi saints on one of the Sundays following Easter. Also on Lesbos, the bull sacrifice to Saint Charalambos is set on a Sunday in May, on Mount Taurus outside the village of Saint Paraskevi. Although the sacrifice is attached to a tradition of the Agios Haralambos Church, it actually holds its roots with the Buphonia (Greek: Βουφόνια "ox-slayings"), a sacrificial ceremony performed in Ancient Greece as part of the Dipolieia, a religious festival held on the 14th of the midsummer month Skirophorion— in June or July.

=== In Thrace ===
In the village of Mega Monastiri in northeastern Thrace, the community used to buy the most robust calves and raise them specifically for the kourbania. These animals designated for sacrifice were never used for farm labour. In some instances, the animal was bathed and decorated with flowers or ribbons, its horns decorated with strips of gold foil and led to sacrifice through all the streets in a joyous procession.

The village priest then performed a number of rites to complete the consecration of the victim before the killing, but unlike the practice in antiquity, the act of killing the animal is no special office and can be performed by anyone. The sacrifice is followed by a festival. The food for the festival is prepared under the supervision of the churchwarden, and is blessed by the priest before the meal begins. In Mega Monastiri, these meals were the scene of gatherings of lineages or clans, each with its own stone table in the churchyard, the place of honour on the eastern end of the table reserved for the clan eldest.

The prayers said by the priest over the victim have a long tradition of attestation, dating from at least the 8th century, establishing the animal sacrifice as long-standing within Christian tradition, over at least a millennium.

== Criticism ==
Many early church fathers wrote extensively against animal sacrifice as being inconsistent with Christianity. They said that the ceremonies fed power to demons.

In the late 18th century, a monk Nicodemus denounced the kourbania as a "barbaric custom" and "vestige of ancient pagan error", without success, as he was himself accused of heresy by the village priests.

Also in the 18th century, bishop Theophiles of Campania attacked the custom as an imitation of the "vain Hellenes". Greek ethnographers in the 19th century did not hesitate to identify the kourbani as a survival of pre-Christian Greek antiquity.

Georgoudi (1979) prefers a comparison with the Hebrew sacrifices korban of the Old Testament, citing early medieval canons and conciliaries which denounce customs such as cooking meat in the sanctuary as Jewish and Armenian Christian, not Greek, practice.

== See also ==
- Animal sacrifice
- Christopaganism
- Crucifixion in the Philippines
- Dušni Brav (in Serbia)
- Eid al-Adha (Qurbani, 'Kurban Bayram')
- Folk Catholicism
- Folk Orthodoxy – Variety of regional or ethnic syncretic expressions of Eastern Orthodoxy
- Madagh (in Armenia)
- Tama (votive)
- Slaughter offering
