= Olla (Roman pot) =

Squat, rounded pot or jar

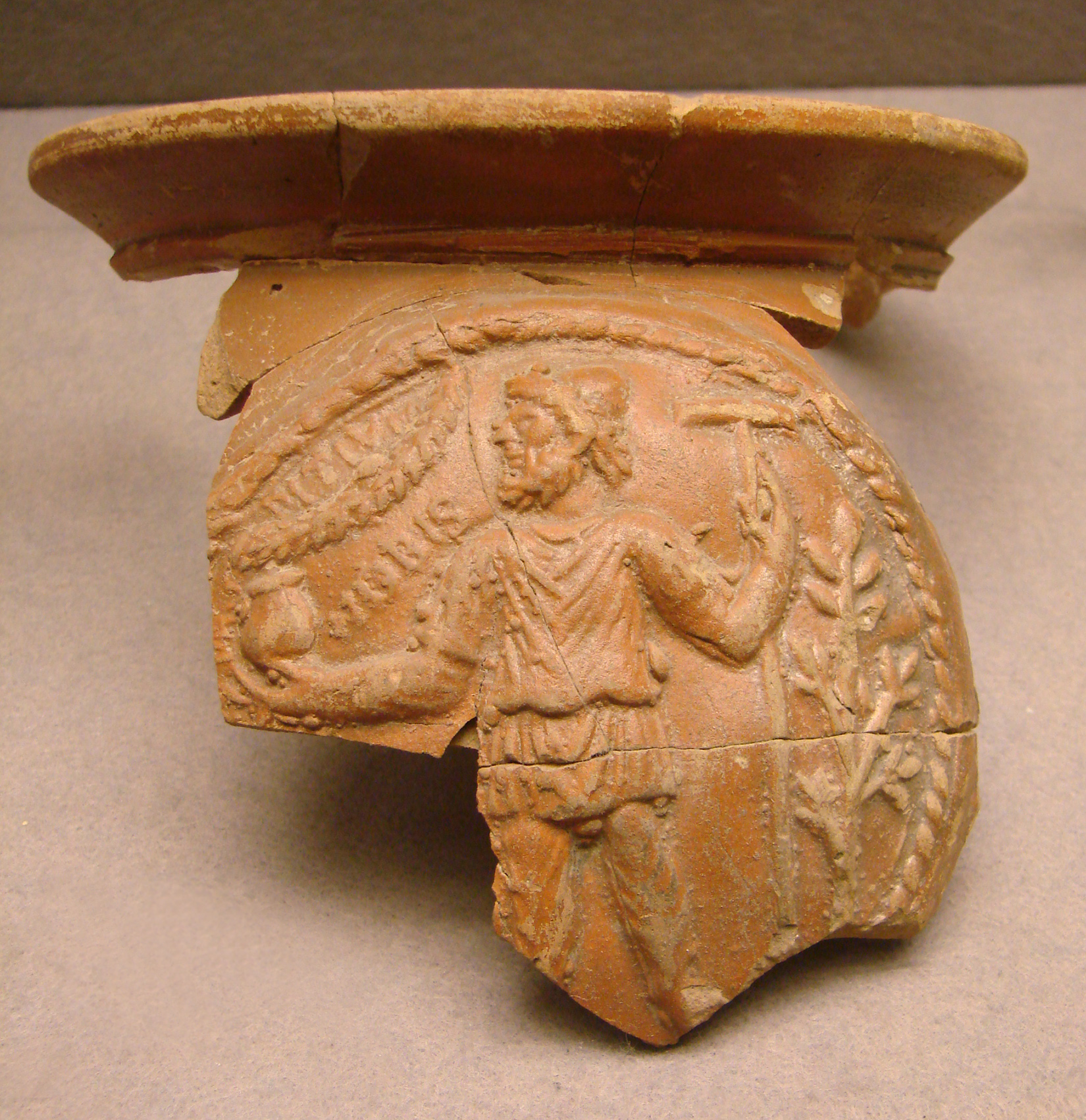
An olla appears in the right hand of the Gallo-Roman mallet god Sucellus; the shape of the fragment suggests that the pot itself might have been an olla

In ancient Roman culture, the olla (archaic Latin: aula or aulla; Greek: χύτρα, chytra) is a squat, rounded pot or jar. An olla would be used primarily to cook or store food, hence the word "olla" is still used in some Romance languages for either a cooking pot or a dish in the sense of cuisine. In the typology of ancient Roman pottery, the olla is a vessel distinguished by its rounded "belly", typically with no or small handles or at times with volutes at the lip, and made within a Roman sphere of influence; the term olla may also be used for Etruscan and Gallic examples, or Greek pottery found in an Italian setting.

In ancient Roman religion, ollae (plural) have ritual use and significance, including as cinerary urns. In the study of Gallo-Roman art and culture, an olla is the small pot carried by Sucellus, by the mallet god often identified with him, or by other gods.

== Cookery ==
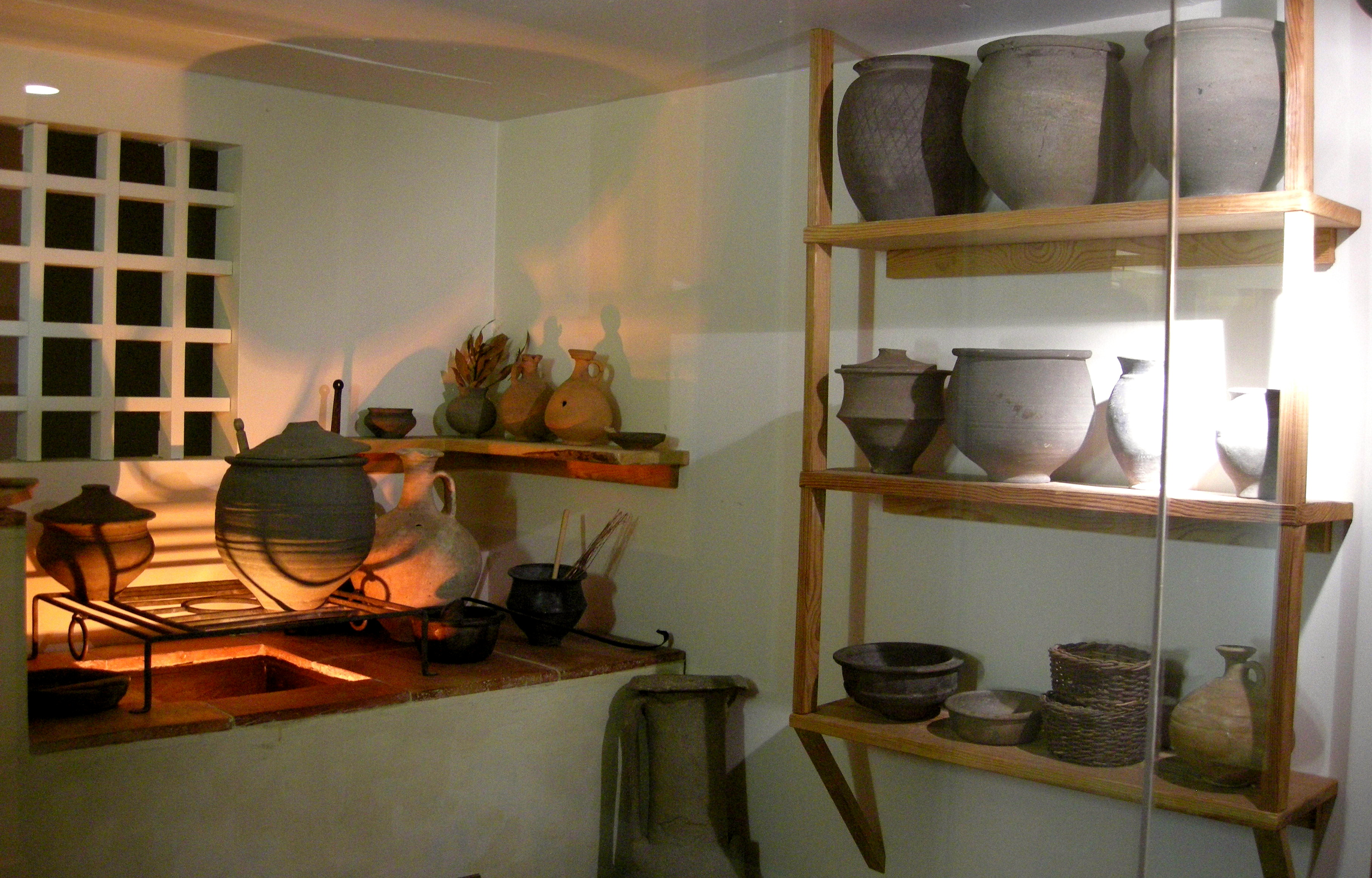
Ollae of varying shapes in a reconstruction of a Roman kitchen; top shelf, and on the rack over the fire

Olla is a generic word for a cooking pot, such as would be used for vegetables, porridge, pulse and such. The 1st-century BC scholar Varro gives an "absurd" etymology that derives the word for vegetables, olera or holera, from olla; although as a matter of scientific linguistics the derivation may be incorrect, it indicates that cookery was considered essential to the pot's function. Isidore of Seville said that the word olla derived from ebullit, "it boils up," and describes a patera as an olla with the sides flattened out more broadly. It was a word of ordinary usage, and does not appear in literary works by Vergil, Horace, and Ovid.

Unlike the aenum or cauldron, which hung over the fire from chains, the olla had a flat bottom for resting on a hot surface, though it might also be placed directly on logs or coals in rustic cookery. The kitchen reconstructed at the House of the Vettii from Pompeii shows a large olla set on a tripod on the stove.

== Funerary use ==
Ollae were used for funerary purposes from earliest times. In Italic inhumations, ollae might be placed with the body in the tomb as grave goods, sometimes with a ladle or dipper. A tomb from a 7th-century BC necropolis at Civita Castellana yielded an olla decorated with a pair of horses and a Faliscan inscription. From the 3rd century BC (Mid-Republic) into the 2nd century AD of the Imperial era, cremation was the most characteristic means of disposing of a body among the Romans. Ollae shifted function to hold cremated remains for entombment, a practice of Etruscan as well as Italic burials. The remains of those of modest means might be contained in earthenware ollae placed on the shelves of an ollarium or columbarium.

== Sacrificial use ==
After the performance of an animal sacrifice, a designated portion of the entrails (exta) was placed either in an olla and boiled, or in oldest times on a spit and roasted, as part of the "cuisine" of sacrifice. The exta were the victim's liver, gall, lungs, and the membrane covering the intestines, with the heart added after 275 BC. The olla was one of the characteristic implements of sacrifice, and appears in reliefs as such, particularly in the Gallic provinces. The vessel is mentioned, for instance, in Livy's account of a sign (prodigium) that manifested divine displeasure: the official presiding over the sacrifice himself poured the cooking liquid out of the olla in order to inspect the remaining entrails, which were intact except for the mysteriously liquified liver.

=== Arval Brethren ===
Ollae figured in the rituals of the Arval Brethren, the "Brothers of the Fields" who constituted a college of priests dating from Rome's archaic period. The exta of the victims used in their sacrifices were placed in an olla and cooked. Examples of these earthenware pots have been uncovered by archaeologists in the sacred groves of the Arvals. Their rudimentary technique suggests the great antiquity of the religious traditions associated with them. After conducting their rites, the Arval priests opened the door to the temple, and cast the ollae down the slope leading up to it.

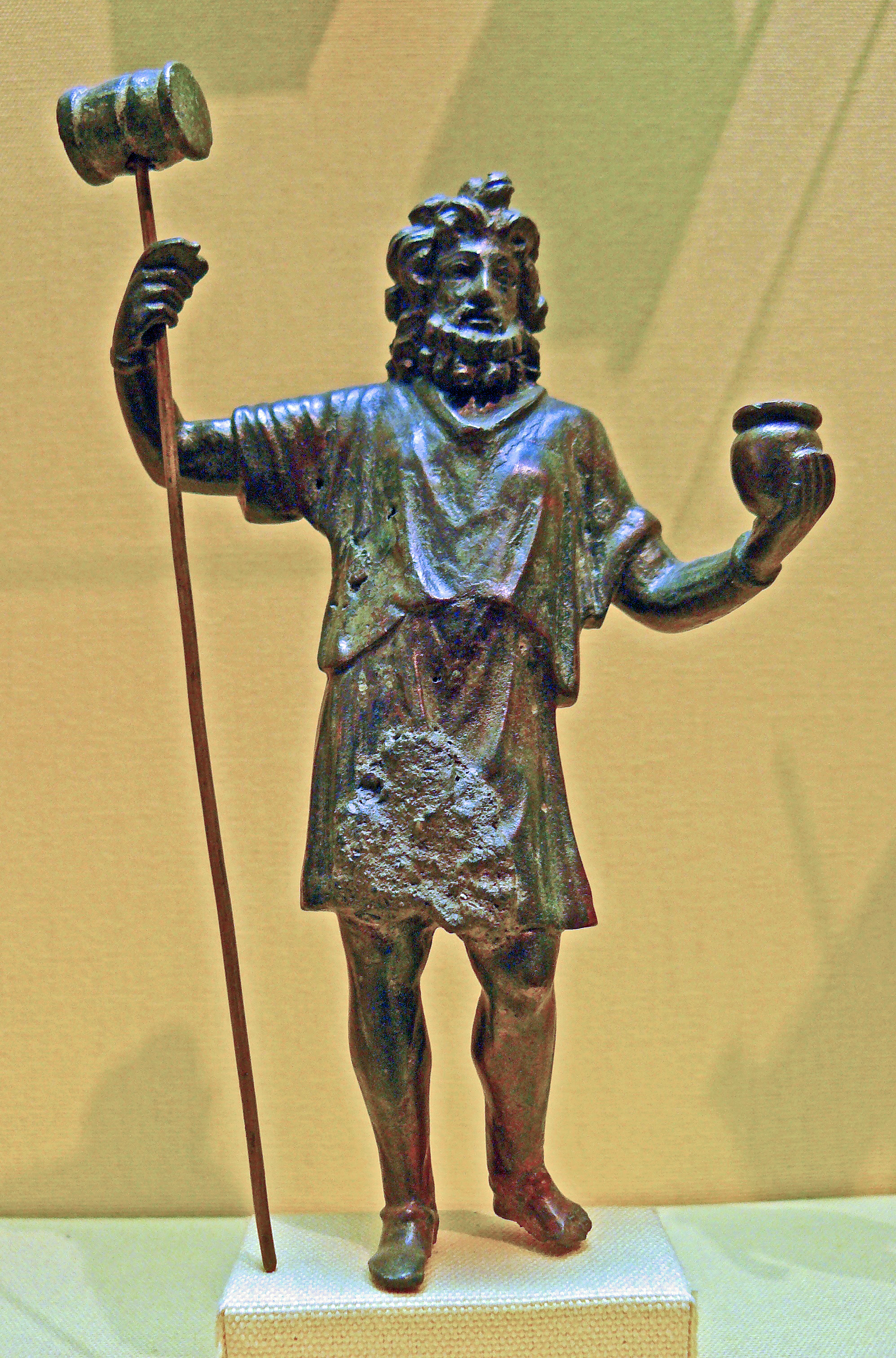
Gallic mallet god with olla, perhaps Sucellus

== Silvanus and the Mallet God ==
The name of the woodland god Silvanus appears in inscriptions within the province of Gallia Narbonensis with representations of a mallet, an olla, or both. The mallet is not a regular attribute of Silvanus, and may be borrowed from the Celtic mallet god sometimes identified with Sucellus.

== See also ==
- Olla
- Ancient Roman pottery
