= Qurban =

Ritual animal sacrifice in Islam

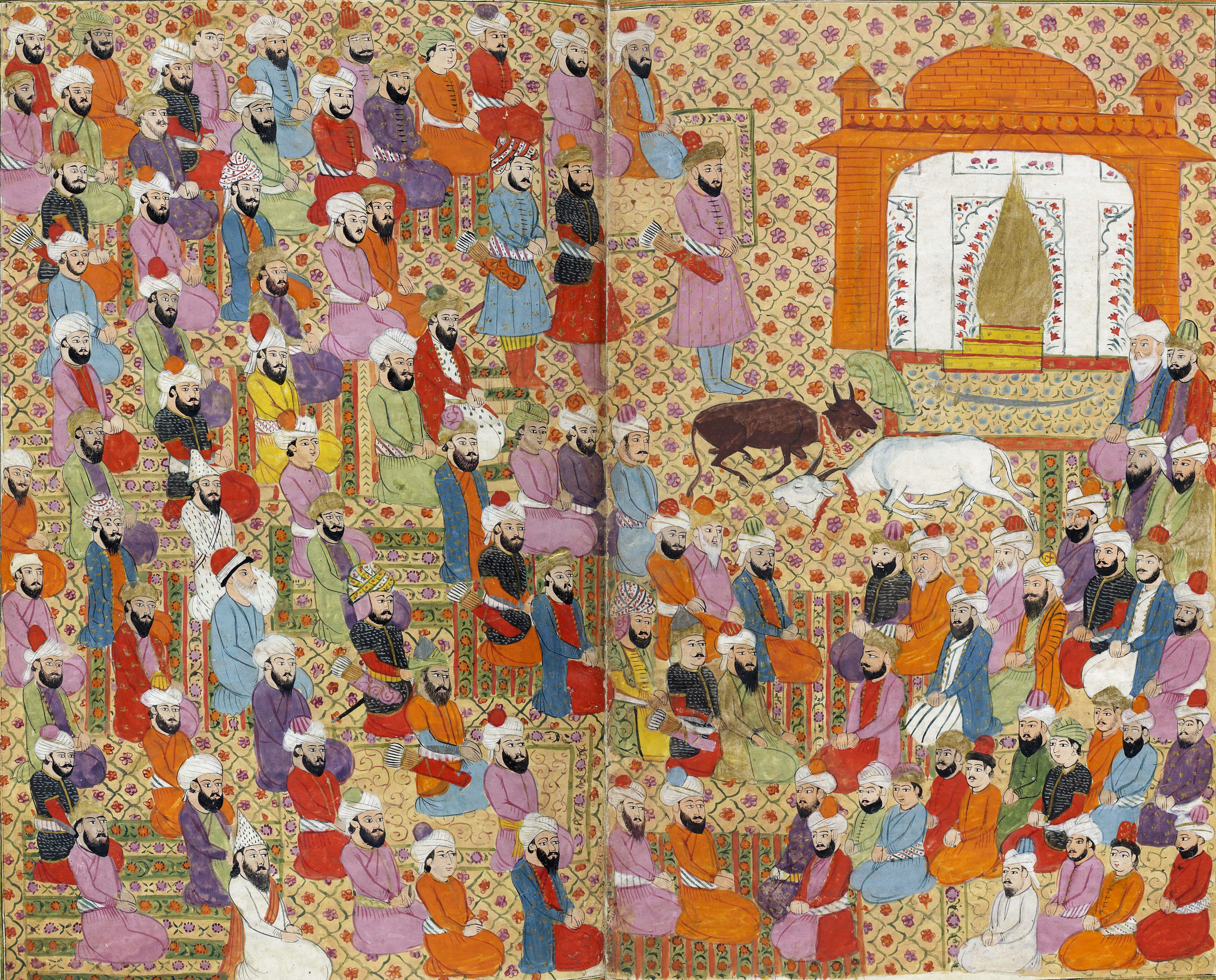
Islamic miniature depicting Muhammad (golden flame) and the Muslims celebrating Eid al-Adha by performing Qurban

Qurbān (Arabic: قربان) or uḍḥiyah (Arabic: أضحية, romanized: sacrificial animal) as referred to in Islamic law, is a ritual animal sacrifice of a livestock animal during Eid al-Adha.

The concept and definition of the word is derived from the Qur'an, the sacred scripture of Muslims, and is the analog of korban in Judaism. The word and concept are similar as in other Abrahamic religions; in the Jewish faith there are several forms of "korban" e.g. korban shelamim ("peace offering"), or korban olah ("elevated offering", also translated as "burnt offering"). The meat of the Islamic qurban is distributed equally between the poor, the donor of the qurban, and the family of the donor.

A commonly used word which may encompass qurban is uḍḥiyah (أضحية). In Islamic Law, udhiyah would refer to the sacrifice of a specific animal, offered by a specific person, on specific days to seek God's pleasure and reward.

== Terminology and scope ==
The word is a cognate in several Semitic languages, being composed of the triconsonantal Semitic root q-r-b (ق ر ب); meaning closeness, with the oldest attestation being the Akkadian aqriba. The word is related in spelling and meaning to the Hebrew: קרבן, romanized: qorbān "offering" and Classical Syriac: ܩܘܪܒܢܐ, romanized: qurbānā "sacrifice", through the cognate Arabic triliteral as "a way or means of approaching someone" or "nearness". In no literal sense does the word mean "sacrifice" however throughout the consistence of liturgical usage in the Abrahamic faiths and near east, the word has gained an analogous meaning to fostering a closeness to God.

== Scriptural foundations ==
The word qurban appears thrice in the Qur'an: once in reference to animal sacrifice and twice referring to sacrifice in the general sense of any act which may bring one closer to God. In contrast, dhabīḥah refers to normal Islamic slaughter outside the day of udhiyyah. In hadiths regarding the qurban offered during Eid al-Adha, forms of the word udhiyah are often used interchangeably with qurban.

=== Abel and Cain ===
The word's first use in the Qur'anic story of creation pertains to the history of the offerings of Abel and Cain (Habil and Qabil).

And recite to them the story of the two sons of Adam [Habil (Abel) and Qabil (Cain)] in truth; when each offered a sacrifice (Qurban), it was accepted from the one but not from the other. The latter said to the former: "I will surely kill you." The former said: "Verily, Allah accepts only from those who are Al-Muttaqun (the pious)."

— Quran 5:27

In the Qur'anic narrative, it is highlighted that the act of sacrifice itself with impure or impious intentions will not be accepted. Taqwa (God consciousness) is stressed as a criterion for the sacrifice bringing blessings from God, underscoring that the ritual itself may be performed in empty and hollow fashion. Abel reasons with his brother, and demonstrates resolve in his own death, vowing to not raise his hand against his own brother in defense or retaliation. Outside of the Qur'an, the offering is decreased to varying degrees. The 14th century religious scholar Ibn Kathir narrates, taking account from Isra'iliyyat, that Abel had offered a sheep whilst his brother Cain offered part of the crops of his land. The ordained procedure of God was that a fire would descend from the heavens and consume the accepted sacrifice. Accordingly, fire came down and enveloped the animal slaughtered by Abel thus accepting the sacrifice of Abel while Cain's sacrifice was rejected. This led to jealousy on the part of Cain resulting in the first human death when he murdered his brother Abel. Refusing to seek repentance for his actions, Cain was not forgiven by God and cursed.

=== Abraham and Ishma'el ===
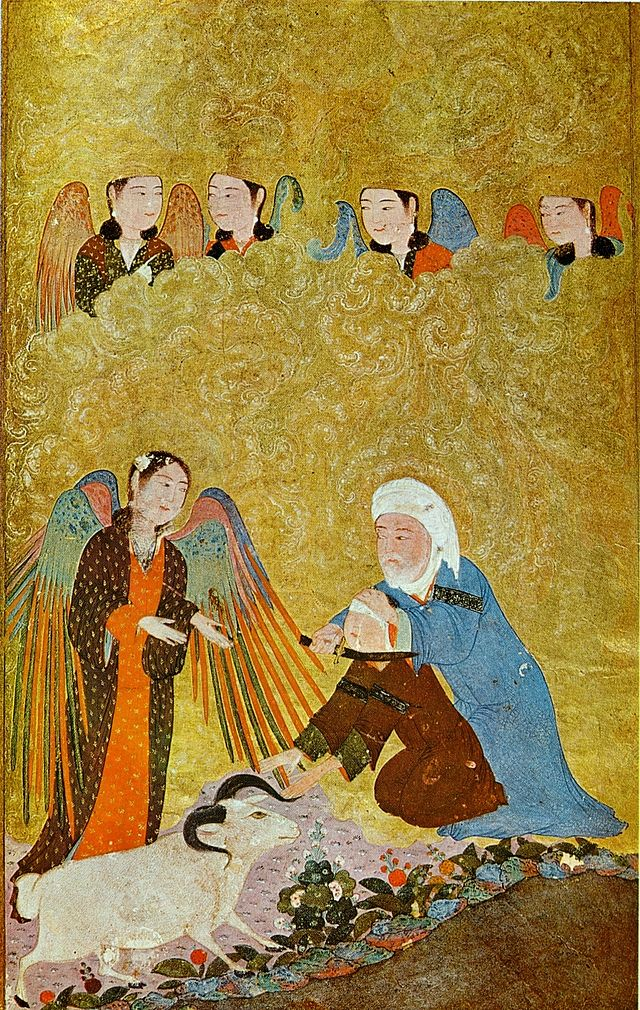
A 15th-century Timurid depiction of angel confronting Abraham and Ishmael

The practice of qurban is entwined with the religious story of the patriarch Abraham (Ibrahim), who had a dream or vision of sacrificing his son Ishma'el (Ismail). In the Qur'anic narrative, his son willingly offers himself to be sacrificed to God. Eid al-Adha (Arabic: عید الأضحى, romanized: ʿĪd al-ʾAḍḥā, lit. 'Festival of the Sacrifice') honors the willingness and devotion of father and son to partake in the act as demonstration of ultimate obedience to God's command. Before Abraham could sacrifice his son, however, he was stopped and God provided a ram to sacrifice instead. In Tafsīr al-Jalālayn, a classical exegesis of the Qur'an, the ram itself is said to be the same one that Abel had sacrificed to God sent back from the garden of Eden. While not the only livestock acceptable, a narration in Sahih Muslim records that the Islamic prophet Muhammad sought out horned, white rams to sacrifice during Eid al-Adha, as the ram of Abraham and Abel had been.

In commemoration of the event, specific livestock animals are sacrificed ritually for consumption. One third of their meat is consumed by the family offering the sacrifice, while the rest is distributed to the poor and needy.

== Jurisprudence ==
For the majority of Muslims, the qurban sacrifice during Eid al-Adha is highly stressed for its religious significance, but not farīḍah (فريضة) or compulsory by law save for in the Hanafi school of law.

The sacrifice of an animal is legal from the morning of the 10th to the sunset of the 12th Dhu l-Hijjah, the 12th lunar month of the Islamic calendar, with the exception of the Shafi'i school, who holds it can be performed until the sunset of the 13th. On these days Muslims all over the world offer qurban which means a sacrifice or slaughter of an animal on specific days. There are stipulations for the animals offered; they can be sheep, goats, lambs, cows (buffalos, bulls) or camels (in strong contrast to Judaism). The animals must also be healthy, free from disease, and cannot be blind or one-eyed, missing parts of their tails or ears (docking or cropping animals ears or tails are forbidden acts), and must be sacrificed in accordance with dhabihah standards. Most schools of fiqh accept that the animal must be domesticated. Moreover, Islamic law forbids stunning of animals prior to the sacrifice so animals typically have their common carotid artery severed without any form of anesthesia.

The meat is generally divided into thirds, one portion going to the one performing the sacrifice, one portion going to their family, and the other going to the poor.

=== Legal status difference in Islamic Schools of thought ===
Topic	Hanafi	Maliki	Shafi'i	Hanbali	Ja'fari (Twelver Shia)
Legal status of qurban (uḍḥiyah)	Usually regarded as wājib (obligatory) for financially able resident Muslims	Generally sunnah muʾakkadah (strongly recommended)	Sunnah muʾakkadah	Sunnah muʾakkadah	Generally mustaḥabb (recommended)
Who is expected to perform it	Adult Muslim possessing sufficient means	Financially able Muslim	Financially able Muslim	Financially able Muslim	Financially able Muslim
Household participation	One sacrifice may fulfil the practice for a household in some interpretations	Household sacrifice commonly accepted	Household inclusion commonly accepted	Household inclusion commonly accepted	Household participation commonly recognized
Traveller status	Travellers commonly exempted or obligation relaxed	Generally not emphasized as obligatory	Recommended if able	Recommended if able	Usually not obligatory
Permitted animals	Camel, cattle, sheep, goat	Camel, cattle, sheep, goat	Camel, cattle, sheep, goat	Camel, cattle, sheep, goat	Camel, cattle, sheep, goat
Minimum animal age (general)	Mature sheep/goat; older cattle and camels	Similar requirements	Similar requirements	Similar requirements	Similar requirements
Sharing large animals	Camel/cattle may be shared among participants	Permitted	Permitted	Permitted	Permitted
Time window	Begins after Eid prayer; typically through 12 Dhu al-Hijjah	Through the days of Tashriq	Through the days of Tashriq	Through the days of Tashriq	Commonly through 13 Dhu al-Hijjah
Distribution of meat	Family, gifts, and charity encouraged	Similar	Similar	Similar	Similar
Delegating sacrifice	Permitted	Permitted	Permitted	Permitted	Permitted

== See also ==
- Dhabihah
- Dušni Brav
- Korban
