= Madagh =

Madagh is an Armenian custom of commemorating victims through requiem services, most often associated with the annual remembrance of the Armenian genocide. Madagh is typically celebrated with community gatherings sponsored by churches, which include public offerings of food. Food offerings often include lamb stew with pilaf made from bulgur, and Armenian flat bread or katah bread.

== Historical origins ==
Some religious scholars assert that madagh (or sometimes matal) has its roots in ancient liturgical sacrifice. The legitimation of the madagh sacrifice within the early Armenian Christian church is particularly associated with Gregory the Illuminator. The madagh is still considered one of the most important religious blessings in the contemporary Armenian Church. Contemporary church leaders assert that the ritual today is imbued with a new set of religious significance within the canon of Orthodox Christian practice. Contemporary interpretations link the madagh with the practice of Christian agape, or communal fellowship and love. It is also connected with the practice of religious charity, because the meal is often given to the community for free and is associated with feeding the poor.

Members of the Armenian diaspora typically associate the serving of the madagh with an annual commemoration of "martyr's day", the anniversary of the massacre of Armenian intellectuals throughout the Anatolian peninsula, which took place on April 24, 1915 (Armenian genocide). Although, for many, it is an apt time for partaking in madagh, madagh celebrations take place throughout the summer months. The connection of the madagh to commemoration of the Armenian genocide in Turkey may be a contentious point, as the genocide is not officially recognized within Turkey. This past uses the term "genocide" to accurately reproduce the understanding and interpretations of those populations that are enacting the ritual and is in keeping with most scholarly accounts. Moreover, despite its association with the genocide, the madagh may be used as part of other requiem services (Hokehankisd), including victims of other massacres or departed loved ones.

== Food and festivities ==
Such events are popular in New York City as well as in the sizable Armenian descent population concentrated in Southeastern Wisconsin and Northern Illinois. The events are often an opportunity to showcase traditional Armenian cuisine. At such feasts, particularly in the Midwestern USA, the madagh is typically celebrated with Lamb Stew and Bulgur Pilaf (Wheat pilaf) (click links for recipes). Older men from the community dig large pits in the earth the night before the feast, in which the communal pots of pilaf and lamb stew are roasted. On the day of the festival, which is free and open to the public, the presiding priest blesses the food and asks for God to remember the departed who are being commemorated as part of the Requiem Service. After the blessing, families line up with pots and bowls into which volunteers pass out the communal lamb stew and pilaf.

Occasionally, one of the few remaining living survivors of the Armenian genocide will be brought in to join the event. When such an honored guest is present, feast attendees typically gather around to hear a first-person account of the history as lived in 1915 through the eyes of a child. As of 2004, it was believed that there were only four remaining living survivors of the genocide in the United States.

Annual madagh festivals are important cultural and community events apart from their historic connection to commemorating Armenian genocide. You may see young men playing soccer or throwing a football while the old men play backgammon in the shade. After the eating is finished, an Armenian band may play Armenian folk music for traditional dancing. Dancers line up next to each other, link pinkie fingers, and move their feet in pattern to the music as the line snakes around the pavilion. At most festival celebrations, guests attending the festival but unfamiliar with the history would be unlikely to note a connection to the genocide.

== See also ==
- Matagh
- Kourbania
