= Apollodoros (vase painter) =

Ancient Greek vase painter

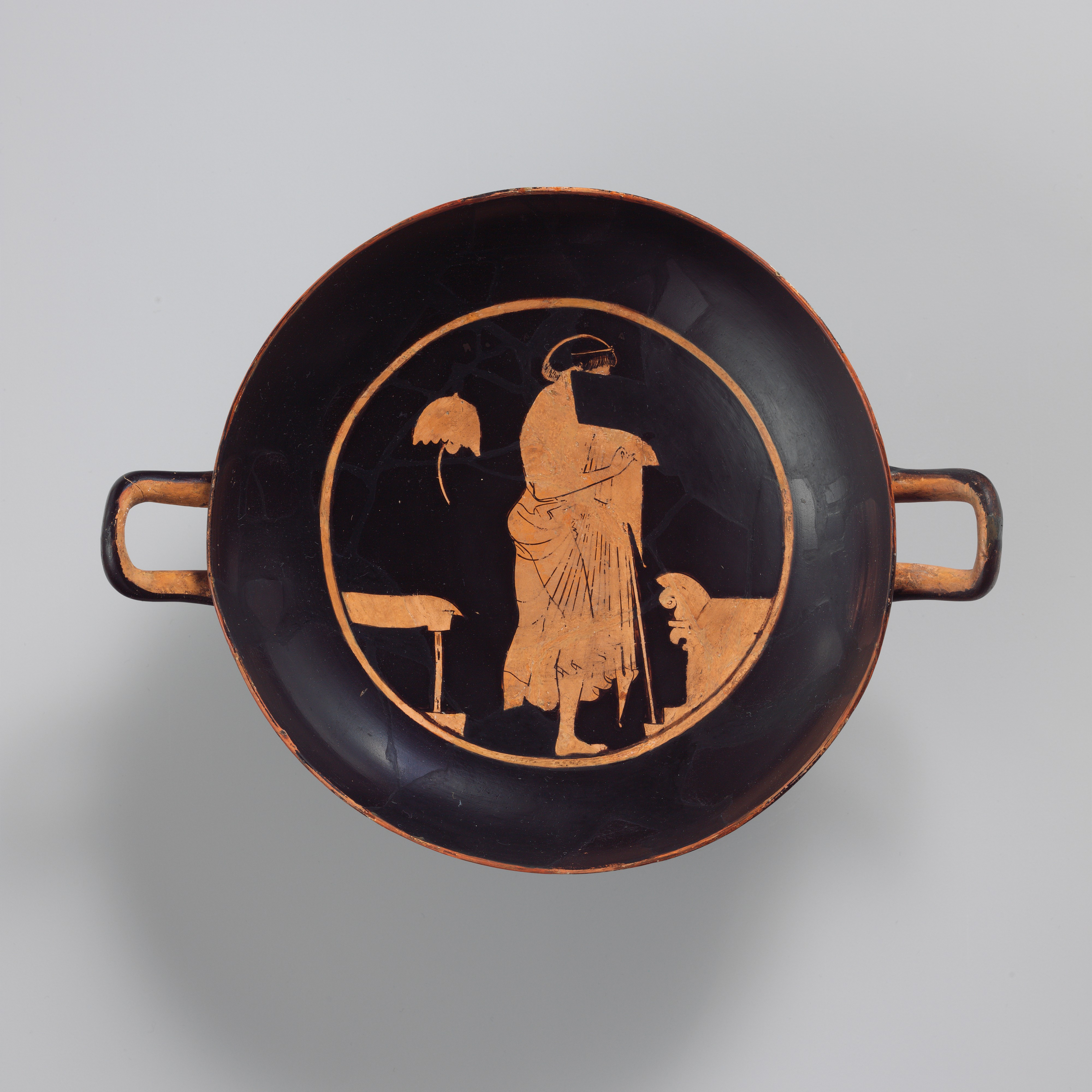
Youth at an altar, ca. 500–490 B.C., Metropolitan Museum of Art 18.145.28

Apollodoros was an ancient Athenian red-figure vase painter who was active in around 500 BCE. His name is found on two cups and many more are attributed to him.

"In the early 1900s scholars distinguished four stylistically distinct but closely related groups of vases, assigning them the names Apollodoros, the Epidromos Painter, the Kleomelos Painter, and the Elpinikos Painter." It was not certain whether the four names represented separate individuals or were stages in the career of one man.

"The cup depicting the Theban Sphinx in the Getty Museum now provides evidence that one individual made all these vases. This cup combines a kalos inscription praising the beautiful youth Kleomelos—which had been the defining feature of the "Kleomelos Painter"—with stylistic features found on the signed cups of Apollodoros, such as mannered proportions and pose, extremely slender elongated fingers, and small, deep-set eyes."
