= Threshold (architecture) =

Sill of a door

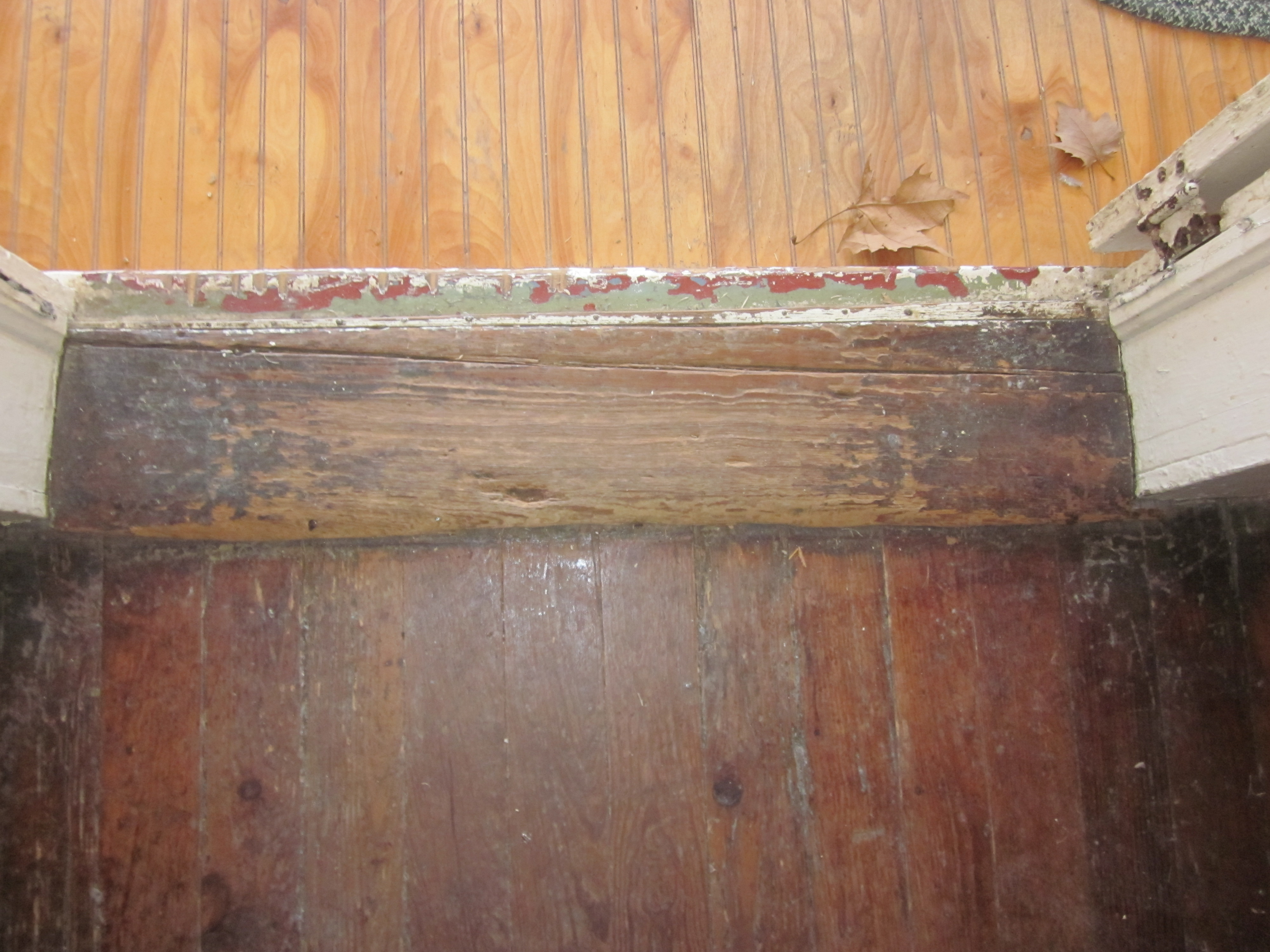
A worn-out wooden threshold

A threshold is the sill of a door. Some cultures attach special symbolism to a threshold. It is called a door saddle in New England.

Door thresholds cover the gap between the floor and the door frame, helping to prevent any water leaks, insects or draughts from entering through the opening.

== Etymology ==
Various popular false etymologies of this word exist, some of which were even recorded by dictionaries in the past and even created by early linguists before linguistics became a strictly scientific field. Some of these false etymologies date from the time of Old English or even earlier.

Many different forms of this word are attested in Old English, which shows that the original meaning of this word and especially of its latter half was already obscure at the time and that most or all of the different Old English spellings were the result of folk etymologies. Although modern dictionaries do not yet record the results of the latest etymological research on this word, they do record the results of older research that shows that the second half is not related to the modern word hold. According to the linguist Anatoly Liberman, the most likely etymology is that the term referred to a threshing area that was originally not part of the doorway but was later associated with it:

At one time, it appears, the threshold was not part of a doorway. The word’s original form became obscure quite early and produced a whole bouquet of folk etymological doublets. Old High German driscubli stands especially close to the sought-after etymon. Most probably, the threshold was a place where corn was threshed (a threshing floor). The word contained a root and a suffix. That suffix has undergone numerous changes, for people tried to identify it with some word that could make sense to them. What remains unclear is not this process but the semantic leap. We are missing the moment at which the threshing floor, however primitive, began to denote the entrance to the room.

== Cultural symbolism ==
In many cultures it has a special symbolism: for instance, in Poland, Ukraine and Russia it is considered bad luck to shake hands or kiss across the threshold when meeting somebody. In many countries it is considered good luck for a bridegroom to carry the bride over the threshold to their new home.
