= Matagh =

Animal slaughter in Armenian Christianity

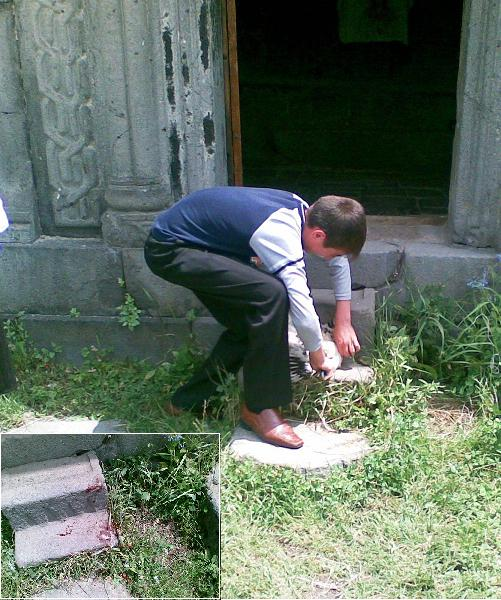
Matagh of a rooster at the entrance of a monastery church (Alaverdi, Armenia, 2009), with inset of bloody steps.

In Armenian Christian tradition, matagh (Armenian: մատաղ mataġ) is a lamb or a rooster slated for slaughter as thanksgiving to God, a practice which has continued from Armenia's past. In many regions of Armenia today, this practice is very much alive in the regular slaughter of chosen animals in front of churches. Matagh is done often to ask God for either forgiveness, health, or to give him something in return. People generally gather at the house where the Matagh was done, where they pray and eat the meat. Tradition holds that the meat must be eaten before sundown and for any salt to be used to be blessed.

While commonly misinterpreted to be a sacrifice for the remission of sins, it does not derive from the practice of atonement through animal sacrifice as in the Old Testament of the Bible. As Fr. Vazken Movsesian states, Matagh is "not a magical incantation, and the Armenian Church does not condone that kind of thing. ... We don't sell protection." Most Armenians consider it a simple recognition of thanks to God and to give food and alms to the poor and needy, as a means of "paying it forward." Many describe it as simply being like any other festal meal given through the Church.

The meat is to be prepared in a simple way stove top (usually Khashlama) with minimal spices. It is not to be grilled over a fire. Also the meat is supposed to be shared among 7 families (relatives and/or neighbors). In many cases a Matagh takes place as an act of thanksgiving to God after an accident or other life-threatening event with a good outcome. Mataghs are commonly performed before young men begin their obligatory military service.

== See also ==
- Madagh
