= Kashrut =

Jewish dietary laws

Kashrut (also kashruth or kashrus, Hebrew: כַּשְׁרוּת) is a set of dietary laws dealing with the foods that religiously observant Jews are permitted to eat and how those foods must be prepared according to Jewish religious law. Foods that may be consumed are deemed kosher (/ˈkoʊʃər/ in English, Yiddish: כּשר), from the Ashkenazi pronunciation of the term that in Sephardi or Modern Hebrew is pronounced kashér (כָּשֵׁר), meaning "fit" (in this context, "fit for consumption"). Food that may not be consumed is deemed treif (/treɪf/ in English, Yiddish: טרײף), also spelled treyf (Yiddish: טריף).

Although the details of the laws of kashrut are numerous and complex, they rest on a few basic principles:

- Only certain types of mammals, birds, and fish, meeting specific criteria are kosher; the consumption of the flesh of any animals that do not meet these criteria, such as pork, frogs, and shellfish, is forbidden, except for locusts, which are the only kosher invertebrate.
- The most basic eating rule in the Torah is that blood is not to be consumed; therefore, as a step to being kosher, mammals and birds must be slaughtered according to a process known as shechita, in which a certified ritual slaughterer, called a shochet, severs the trachea, esophagus, carotid arteries, and jugular veins in a single, quick cut using an ultra-sharp instrument called a chalaf; doing so causes rapid and massive blood loss.
- The meat must still go through a process known as koshering or kashering to be considered fit for consumption. The three approved methods are broiling, roasting, and soaking and salting.
- Meat and meat derivatives may never be mixed with milk and milk derivatives. Separate equipment must be used for the storage and preparation of meat-based and dairy-based foods.

== Categorizations ==
Every food that is considered kosher is also categorized as follows:

- Meat products (also called b'sari or fleishig) are those that contain kosher meat, such as beef, lamb, or venison; kosher poultry, such as chicken, goose, duck, or turkey; or derivatives of meat such as animal gelatin; additionally, non-animal products that were processed on equipment used for meat or meat-derived products must also be considered as meat (b'chezkat basar).
- Dairy products (also called c'halavi or milchig) contain milk or any derivatives such as butter or cheese; additionally, non-dairy products that were processed on equipment used for milk or milk-derived products must also be considered as milk (b'chezkat chalav).
- Pareve (also called parve, parveh meaning "neutral") products contain neither meat, milk, nor their respective derivatives; they include foods such as kosher fish, eggs from permitted birds, grains, produce, and other edible vegetation. They remain pareve if they are not mixed with or processed using equipment that is used for any meat or dairy products.

While any produce that grows from the earth, such as fruits, grains, vegetables, and mushrooms, is always permissible, laws regarding the status of certain agricultural produce, especially that grown in the Land of Israel such as tithes and produce of the Sabbatical year, impact their permissibility for consumption.

Most of the basic laws of kashrut are derived from the Torah's books of Leviticus and Deuteronomy. Their details and practical application, however, are set down in the Oral Torah, (eventually codified in the Mishnah and Talmud), and elaborated on in the later rabbinical literature. Although the Torah does not state the rationale for most kashrut laws, some suggest that they are only tests of obedience, while others have suggested philosophical, practical, and hygienic reasons.

Over the past century, many kashrut certification agencies have started to certify products, manufacturers, and restaurants as kosher, usually authorizing the use of a proprietary symbol or certificate, called a hechsher, to be displayed by the food establishment or on the product, which indicates that they are in compliance with the kosher laws. This labeling is also used by some non-Jewish people, examples of which include those whose religions (including Islam) expect adherence to a similar set of dietary laws, people with allergies to dairy foods, and vegans, who use the various kosher designations to determine whether a food contains meat or dairy-derived ingredients.

The laws of kashrut are a major area covered in traditional rabbinic ordination;. And numerous scholarly and popular works exist on these topics, covering both practice and theory. (Note: For example, the series by Rabbi Aharon Pfeuffer)

== Explanations ==
=== Philosophical ===
Jewish philosophy divides the 613 commandments (or mitzvot) into three groups—laws that have a rational explanation and would probably be enacted by most orderly societies (mishpatim), laws that are understood after being explained, but would not be legislated without the Torah's command (eidot), and laws that do not have a rational explanation (chukim).

Some Jewish scholars say that kashrut should be categorized as laws for which there is no particular explanation since the human mind is not always capable of understanding divine intentions. In this line of thinking, the dietary laws were given as a demonstration of God's authority, and man must obey without asking why. Although Maimonides concurs that all the statutes of the Torah are decrees, he is of the view that whenever possible, one should seek out reasons for the Torah's commandments.

Some theologians have said that the laws of kashrut are symbolic in character: kosher animals represent virtues, while non-kosher animals represent vices. The 1st-century BCE Letter of Aristeas argues that the laws "have been given [...] to awake pious thoughts and to form the character". This view reappears in the work of the 19th-century Rabbi Samson Raphael Hirsch.

The Torah prohibits "cooking the kid (goat, sheep, calf) in its mother's milk". While the Torah does not provide a reason, it has been suggested that the practice was perceived as cruel and insensitive.

Hasidic Judaism believes that everyday life is imbued with channels connecting with Divinity, the activation of which it sees as helping the Divine Presence to be drawn into the physical world; Hasidism argues that the food laws are related to the way such channels, termed 'sparks of holiness', interact with various animals. These 'sparks of holiness' are released whenever a Jew manipulates any object for a 'holy reason', (which includes eating); however, not all animal products are capable of releasing their 'sparks of holiness'. The Hasidic argument is that animals are imbued with signs that reveal the release of these sparks, and the signs are expressed in the biblical categorization of ritually 'clean' and ritually 'unclean'.

=== Medical ===
Although the reason for kashrut is that it is a decree from the Torah, there have been attempts to provide scientific support for the view that Jewish food laws have an incidental health benefit. One of the earliest is that of Maimonides in The Guide for the Perplexed (c. 1190). Most other traditional scholars have rejected this theory outright.

In 1953, David Macht, an Orthodox Jew and proponent of the theory of biblical scientific foresight, conducted toxicity experiments on many kinds of animals and fish. His experiment involved lupin seedlings being supplied with extracts from the meat of various animals; Macht reported that in 100% of cases, extracts from ritually 'unclean' meat inhibited the seedling's growth more than that from ritually 'clean' meats.

These explanations are controversial. Scholar Lester L. Grabbe, writing in the Oxford Bible Commentary on Leviticus, says "[a]n explanation now almost universally rejected is that the laws in this section have hygiene as their basis. Although some of the laws of ritual purity roughly correspond to modern ideas of physical cleanliness, many of them have little to do with hygiene. For example, there is no evidence that the 'unclean' animals are intrinsically bad to eat or to be avoided in a Mediterranean climate, as is sometimes asserted."

== Rules ==
=== Prohibited foods ===
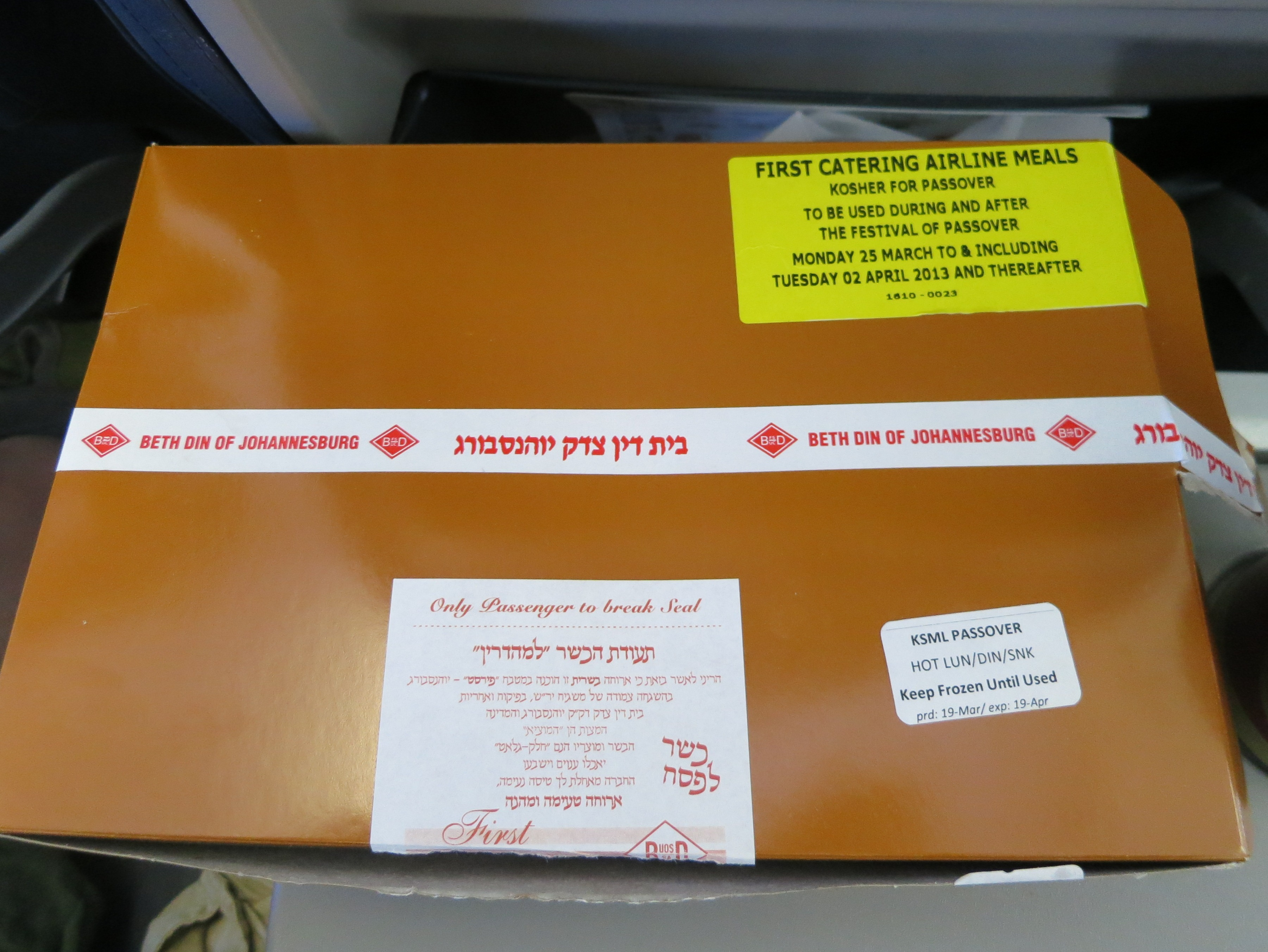
Kosher airline meal approved by The Johannesburg Beth Din

The laws of kashrut can be classified according to the origin of the prohibition (biblical or rabbinical) and whether the prohibition concerns the food itself or a mixture of foods. Biblically prohibited foods include:

- Non-kosher animals—any mammals without certain identifying characteristics (cloven hooves and rumination); any birds of prey; any fish without fins or scales (thus excluding catfish, for instance). All invertebrates are non-kosher apart from certain types of locust, on which most communities lack a clear tradition. No reptiles or amphibians are kosher. There are also no rodents that are kosher.
- Carrion (nevelah)—meat from a kosher animal that has not been slaughtered according to the laws of shechita. This prohibition includes animals that have been slaughtered by non-Jews.
- Injured (terefah)—an animal with a significant defect or injury, such as a fractured bone or particular types of lung adhesions.
- Blood (dam)—the blood of kosher mammals and fowl is removed through salting, with special procedures for the liver, which is very rich in blood.
- Particular fats (chelev)—particular parts of the abdominal fat of cattle, goats and sheep must be removed by a process called nikkur.
- The twisted nerve (gid hanasheh)—the sciatic nerve, as according to Genesis 32:32 the patriarch Jacob's was damaged when he fought with an angel, so may not be eaten and is removed by nikkur.
- A limb of a living animal (ever min ha-chai)—according to Jewish law, God forbade Noah and his descendants to consume flesh torn from a live animal. Hence, Jewish law considers this prohibition applicable even to non-Jews, and therefore, a Jew may not give or sell such meat to a non-Jew.
- Untithed food (tevel)—produce of the Land of Israel requires the removal of certain tithes, which in ancient times were given to the kohanim (priests), Levites and the poor (terumah, maaser rishon and maasar ani respectively) or taken to the Old City of Jerusalem to be eaten there (maaser sheni).
- Fruit during the first three years (orlah)—according to Leviticus 19:23, fruit from a tree in the first three years after planting may not be consumed (both in the Land of Israel and the diaspora). This applies also to the fruit of the vine—grapes, and wine produced from them.
- New grain (chadash)—the Bible prohibits newly grown grain (planted after Passover the previous year) until the second day of Passover; there is debate as to whether this law applies to grain grown outside the Land of Israel.
- Wine of libation (yayin nesekh)—wine that may have been dedicated to idolatrous practices.

Biblically prohibited mixtures include:

- Mixtures of meat and milk (basar be-chalav)—this law derives from the broad interpretation of the commandment not to "cook a kid in its mother's milk"; other non-kosher foods are permitted for non-dietary use (e.g. to be sold to non-Jews), but Jews are forbidden to benefit from mixtures of meat and milk in any way.
- Different species of plants grown together (kilayim)—in the Land of Israel different species of plants are to be grown separately and not in close proximity according to Leviticus 19:19 and Deuteronomy 22:9–11.
  - A specific subdivision of this law is kil'ei ha-kerem, the prohibition of planting any grain or vegetable near a grapevine; this law applies to Jews throughout the world, and a Jew may not derive benefit from such produce.

Rabbinically prohibited foods include:

- Non-Jewish milk (chalav akum)—milk that may have an admixture of milk from non-kosher animals.
- Non-Jewish cheese (gevinat akum)—cheese that may have been produced with non-kosher rennet.
- Non-Jewish wine (stam yeinam)—wine that while not produced for idolatrous purposes may otherwise have been poured for such a purpose or alternatively when consumed will lead to intermarriage.
- Food cooked by a non-Jew (bishul akum)—this law was enacted for concerns of intermarriage. (Minor)
- Non-Jewish bread (pat akum)—this law was enacted for concerns of intermarriage.
- Health risk (sakanah)—certain foods and mixtures are considered a health risk, such as mixtures of fish and meat.

=== Permitted and forbidden animals ===
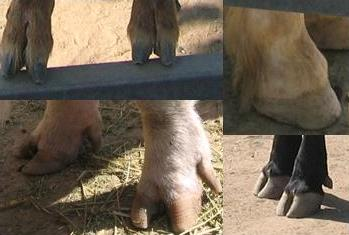
Cloven hooves in goats (upper left), pigs (lower left), and cattle (lower right). Horse hooves (upper right) are not cloven.

Only meat from particular species is permissible. Mammals that both chew their cud (ruminate) and have cloven hooves can be kosher. Animals with one characteristic but not the other (the camel, the hyrax, and the hare because they have no cloven hooves, and the pig because it does not ruminate) are specifically excluded.

In 2008, a rabbinical ruling determined that giraffes and their milk are eligible to be considered kosher. The giraffe has both split hooves and chews its cud, characteristics of animals considered kosher. Findings from 2008 show that giraffe milk curdles, meeting kosher standards. Although kosher, the giraffe is not slaughtered today because the process would be very costly. Giraffes are difficult to restrain, and their use for food could cause the species to become endangered.

Non-kosher birds are listed outright in the Torah, but the exact zoological references are disputed and some references refer to families of birds (24 are mentioned). The Mishnah refers to four signs provided by the sages. First, a dores (predatory bird) is not kosher. Additionally, kosher birds possess three physical characteristics: an extra toe in the back (which does not join the other toes in supporting the leg), a zefek (crop), and a korkoban (gizzard) with a peelable lumen. However, individual Jews are barred from merely applying these regulations alone; an established tradition (masorah) is necessary to allow birds to be consumed, even if it can be substantiated that they meet all four criteria. The only exception to this is the turkey. There was a time when certain authorities considered the signs sufficient, so Jews started eating this bird without a masorah because it possesses all the signs (simanim) in Hebrew.

Fish must have fins and scales to be kosher. Shellfish and other non-fish water fauna are not kosher. Insects are not kosher, except for certain species of kosher locust. Any animal that eats other animals, whether they kill their food or eat carrion, is generally not kosher, as well as any animal that has been partially eaten by other animals.

Class	Forbidden kinds
Mammals	Carnivores; animals that do not chew the cud (e.g. pork); animals that do not have cloven hooves (e.g., the camel, the hare, the horse and the hyrax); bats; rodents
Birds	Birds of prey; scavengers
Reptiles and amphibians	All
Water animals	All non-fish. Among fish, all those that do not have both fins and scales
Insects	All, except particular types of locust or grasshopper that, according to most, cannot be identified today

=== Separation of meat and milk ===
Meat and milk (or derivatives) may not be mixed in the sense that meat and dairy products are not served at the same meal, served or cooked in the same utensils, or stored together.

Observant Jews have separate sets of dishes, and sometimes different kitchens, for meat and milk, and wait anywhere between one and six hours after eating meat before consuming milk products. The milchig and fleishig (literally "milky" and "meaty") utensils and dishes are the commonly referred-to Yiddish delineations between dairy and meat ones.

According to the Shulchan Aruch, a six-hour waiting period is recommended between consuming meat and dairy. During this time, it is generally advised to abstain from brushing and rinsing the mouth.

Shelomo Dov Goitein writes, "the dichotomy of the kitchen into a meat and a milk section, so basic in an observant Jewish household, is [...] never mentioned in the Geniza". Goitein believed that in the early Middle Ages Jewish families kept only one set of cutlery and cooking ware. According to David C. Kraemer, the practice of keeping separate sets of dishes developed only in the late 14th and 15th centuries. It is possible observant Jews before then waited overnight for the meat or dairy gravy absorbed in a pot's walls to become insignificant (lifgam) before using the pot for the other foodstuff (meat or dairy).

=== Kosher slaughter ===
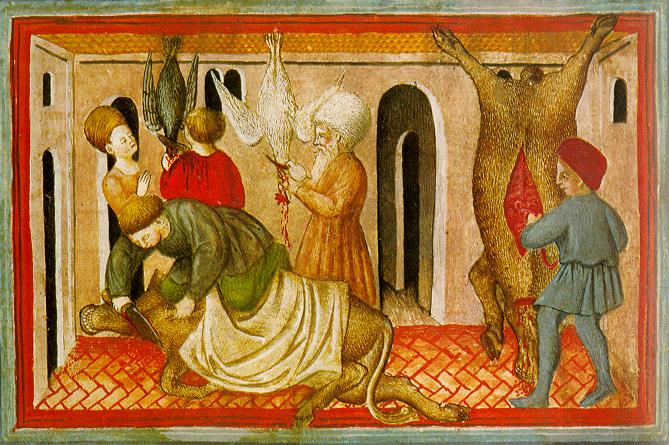
A 15th-century depiction of shechita

Mammals and fowl must be slaughtered by a trained individual (a shochet) using a special method of slaughter, shechita. Shechita slaughter severs the jugular vein, carotid artery, esophagus, and trachea in a single continuous cutting movement with an unserrated, sharp knife (which is regularly inspected and sharpened). Failure to meet any of these criteria, as well as applying too much pressure on the animal's neck or tearing instead of slicing, renders the meat of the animal non-kosher.

The body of the slaughtered animal must be checked after slaughter to confirm that the animal had no medical condition or defect that would have caused it to die of its own accord within a year, which would make the meat unsuitable.

These conditions (treifot) include 70 different categories of injuries, diseases, and abnormalities whose presence renders the animal non-kosher.

It is forbidden to consume certain parts of the animal, such as certain fats (chelev) and the sciatic nerves from the legs, the process of excision being done by experts before the meat is sold. Where there is a market for non-Kosher meat, the entire rear half of the animal, where the numerous blood vessels, the sciatic nerves and the prohibited fats are more difficult to remove, is often not processed and is sold as non-Kosher.

As much blood as possible must be removed through the kashering process; this is usually done through the removal or draining of large blood vessels and soaking and salting the meat, but the liver, as it is rich in blood, is grilled over an open flame. The removal of blood must take place during the first three days after the Shechita, before coagulation makes the blood too difficult to extract, but the limit may be extended for an additional three days by washing or soaking the meat.

Fish (and kosher locusts, for those who follow the traditions permitting them) must be killed before being eaten, but no particular method has been specified in Jewish law. Legal aspects of ritual slaughter are governed not only by Jewish law but civil law as well.

Some believe that this ensures the animal dies instantly without unnecessary suffering, but some animal rights activists view the process as cruel, claiming that the animal may not lose consciousness immediately, and activists have called for it to be banned.

==== Preparation of meats ====
When an animal is ritually slaughtered (shechted) the raw meat is traditionally cut, salted, and rinsed, prior to cooking. Salting of raw meat draws out the blood that lodges on the inner surface of the meat. The salting is done with coarse grain salt, commonly referred to as kosher salt, after which the meat is laid over a grating or colander to allow for drainage, remaining so for the duration of time that it takes to walk one biblical mile (approximately 18–24 minutes). Afterwards, the residue of salt is rinsed away with water, and the meat can then be cooked.

Meat that is roasted requires no prior salting, as fire causes a natural purging of blood.

Turei Zahav ("Taz"), a 17th-century commentary on the Shulchan Arukh, ruled that the pieces of meat can be "very thick" when salting. The Yemenite Jewish practice, however, follows Saadiah Gaon, who required that the meat not be larger than half a "rotal" (i.e. roughly 216 grams (7.6 oz)) when salting. This allows the effects of the salt to penetrate.

=== Kosher utensils ===
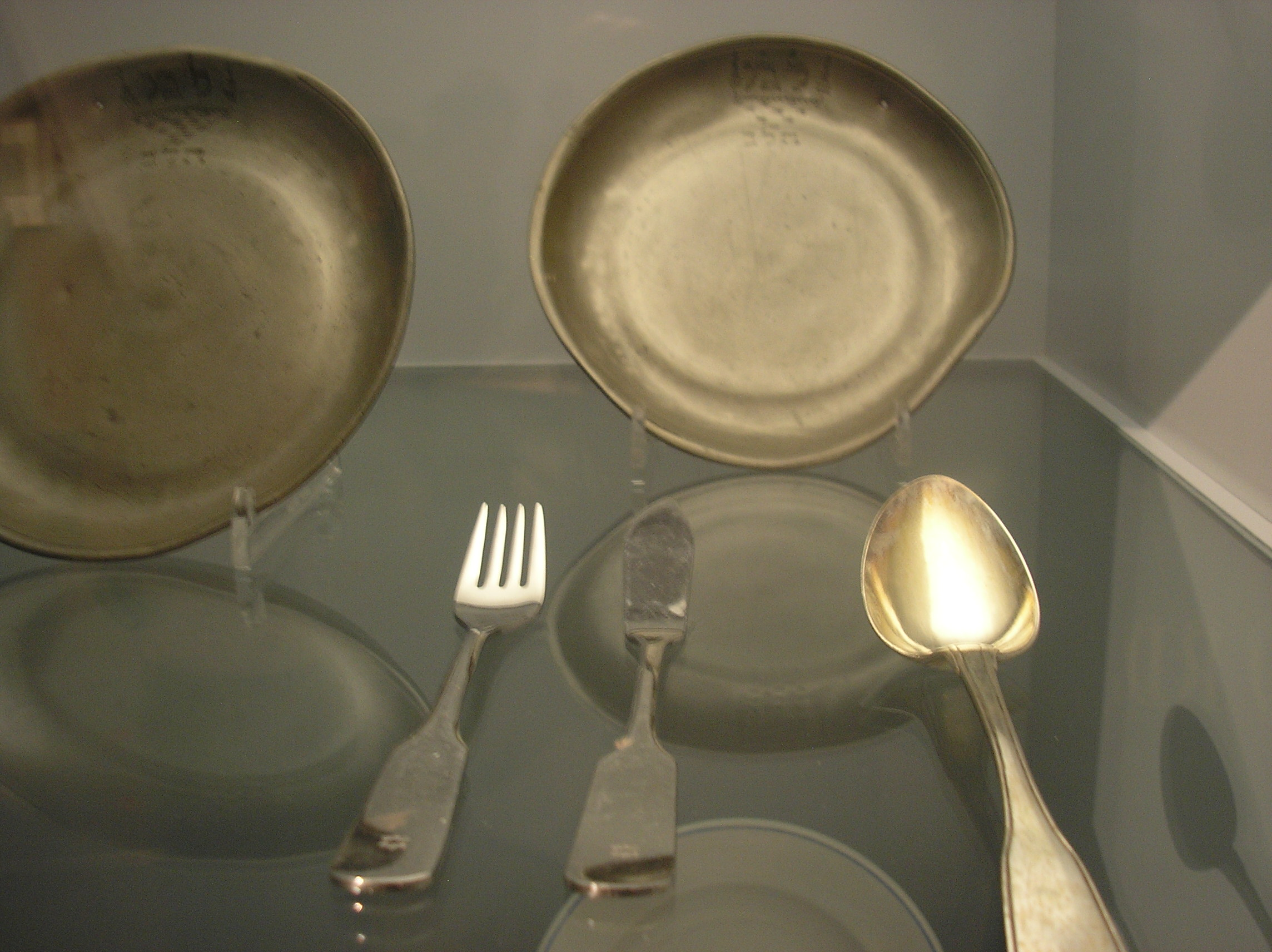
Kosher dairy dishes from the 19th century in the Jewish Museum, Berlin

Utensils used for non-kosher foods become non-kosher, and make even otherwise kosher food prepared with them non-kosher.

Some such utensils, depending on the material they are made from, can be made suitable for preparing kosher food again by immersion in boiling water or by the application of a blowtorch.

Food prepared in a manner that violates the Shabbat (Sabbath) may not be eaten; although in certain instances it is permitted after the Shabbat is over.

==== Appliances with blades ====
Appliances with blades, such as those which chop blend or grind, are subject to special consideration when there is intent to use them for any two of the three categories: Dairy-based, Meat-based and Pareve (neutral). This derives from the fact that knives have a unique standing among kitchen utensils, as used knives are suspect of always having a fatty residue on them. This may be rectified by thoroughly cleaning the knife with abrasive material. In ancient times this was achieved by thrusting the knife into different spots of hard earth. Additionally, based on Talmudic discourse it is suggested that the very pressure of the knife on the food being cut causes the knife to emit flavor into the food, if the food being cut is sharp, hot or sour (this is known as "Dochaka DeSakina" in halachic sources). Thus a knife used to cut hot, sour or sharp non-kosher food will make the points of contact on the kosher food it cuts non-kosher. Additionally, a knife that cuts hot, sour or sharp food from one of the meat or dairy categories may not be used to cut food from the other category, and Pareve food cut by such a knife may not be eaten with food from the other category. As such, food processors, blenders and mixers used for one of the categories of meat or dairy, may not be used for the other.

=== Passover laws ===
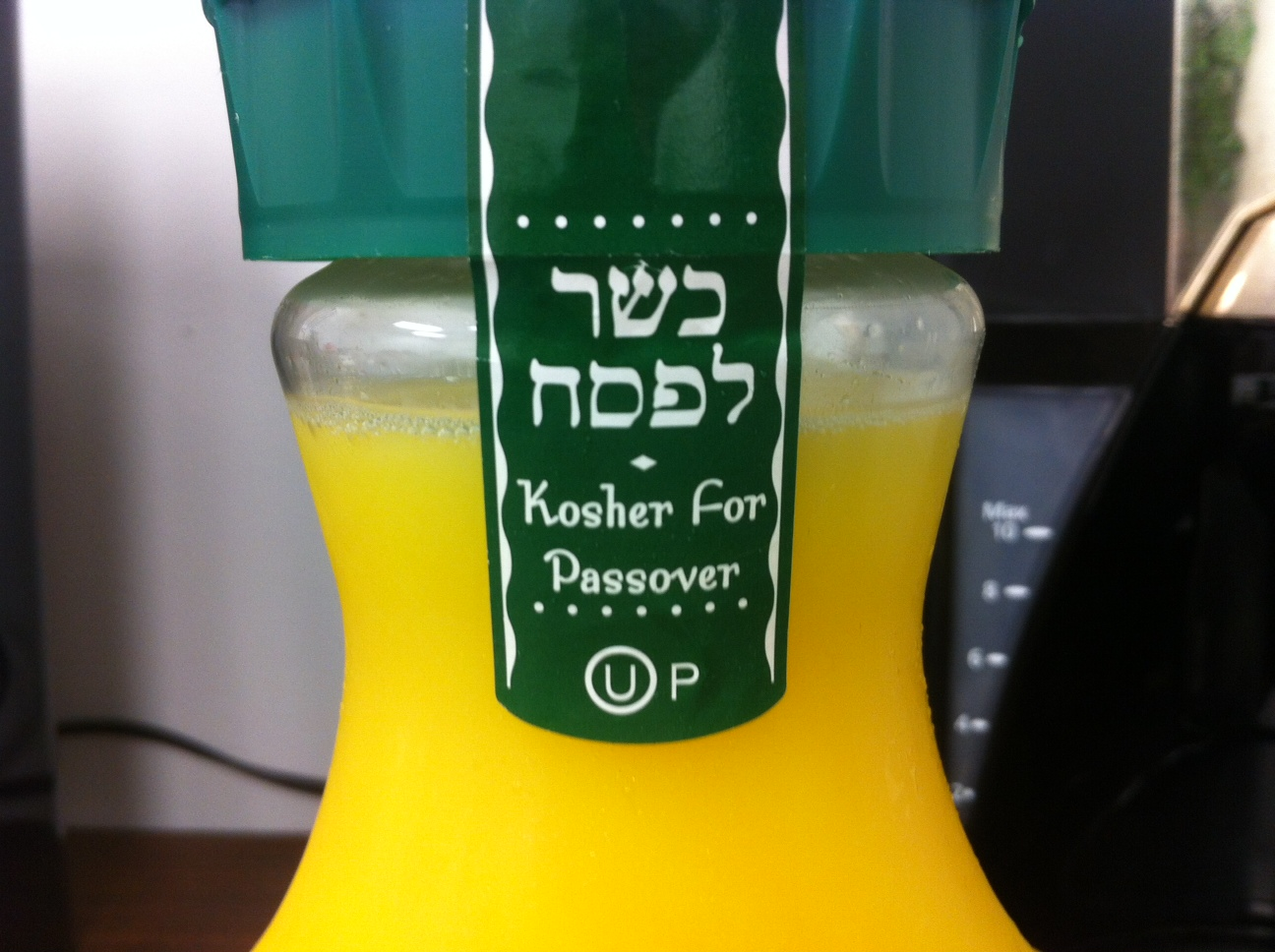
The label on a bottle of orange juice certifying that it is kosher for Passover

Passover has stricter dietary rules, the most important of which is the prohibition on eating leavened bread or derivatives of this, which are known as chametz. This prohibition is derived from Exodus 12:15.

Utensils used in preparing and serving chametz are also forbidden on Passover unless they have been ritually cleansed (kashered).

Observant Jews often keep separate sets of meat and dairy utensils for Passover use only. In addition, some groups follow various eating restrictions on Passover that go beyond the rules of kashrut, such as not eating kitniyot, gebrochts or garlic.

=== Produce of the Land of Israel ===
Biblical rules also control the use of agriculture produce, for example, with respect to their tithing, or when it is permitted to eat them or to harvest them, and what must be done to make them suitable for human consumption.

For produce grown in the Land of Israel a modified version of the biblical tithes must be applied, including Terumat HaMaaser, Maaser Rishon, Maaser Sheni, and Maasar Ani (untithed produce is called tevel); the fruit of the first three years of a tree's growth or replanting are forbidden for eating or any other use as orlah; produce grown in the Land of Israel on the seventh year obtains k'dushat shvi'it, and unless managed carefully is forbidden as a violation of the Shmita (Sabbatical Year).

Some rules of kashrut are subject to different rabbinical opinions. For example, many hold that the rule against eating chadash (new grain) before the 16th of the month Nisan does not apply outside the Land of Israel.

=== Vegetables ===
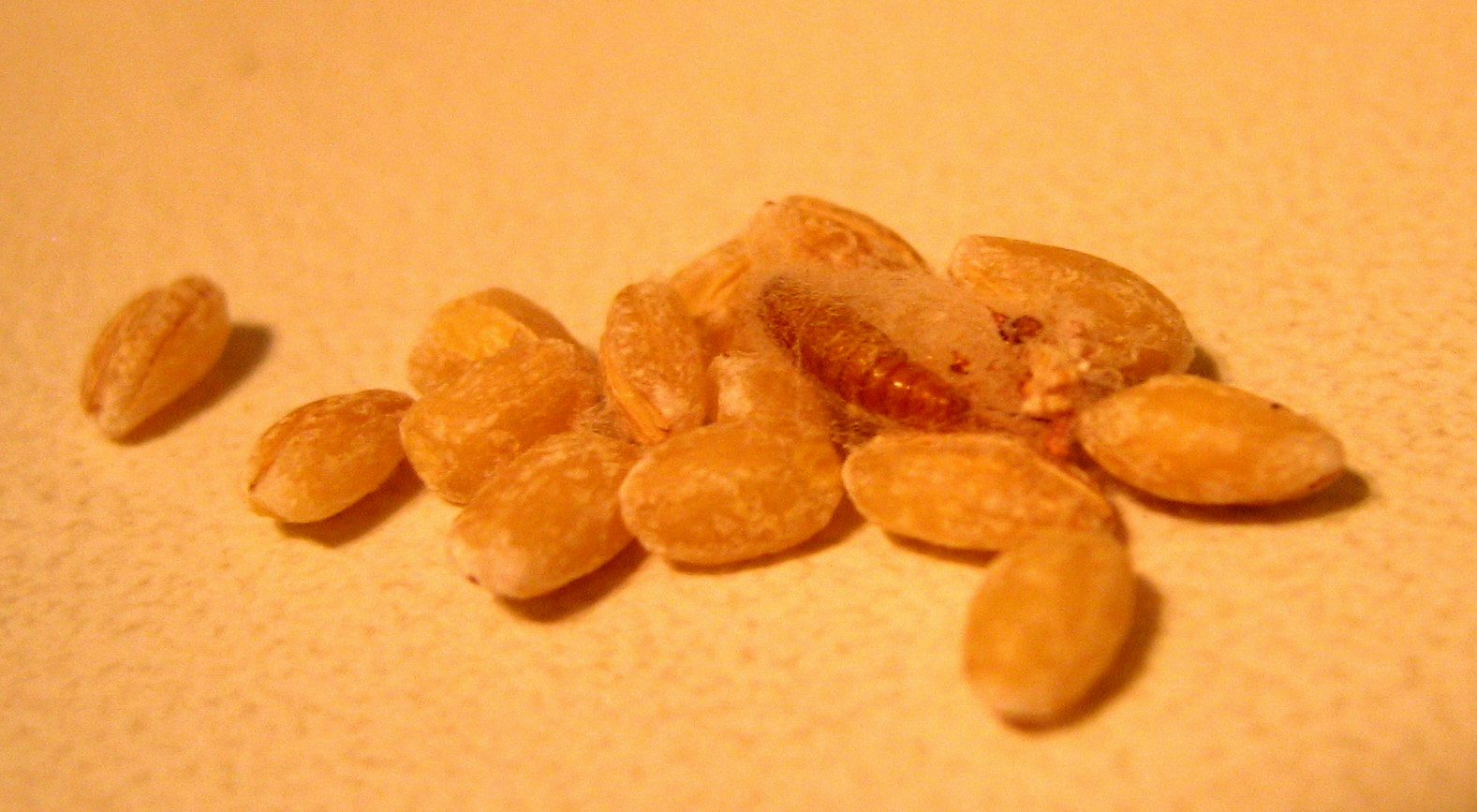
A cocoon found among barleycorns in a commercially available bag of barley. Foods such as seeds, nuts and vegetables need to be checked to avoid eating insects.

Although plants and minerals are nearly always kosher, vegetarian restaurants and producers of vegetarian foods are required to obtain a hechsher, certifying that a rabbinical organization has approved their products as being kosher, because the hechsher usually certifies that certain vegetables have been checked for insect infestation and steps have been taken to ensure that cooked food meets the requirements of bishul Yisrael. Vegetables such as spinach and cauliflower must be checked for insect infestation. The proper procedure for inspecting and cleaning varies by species, growing conditions, and views of individual rabbis. Hydroponic produce introduces additional kosher considerations, especially in determining the correct blessing to say before eating.

=== Pareve foods ===
A pareve food is one which is neither meat nor dairy. Fish fall into this category, as well as any food that is not animal-derived. Eggs are also considered pareve despite being an animal product.

Some processes convert a meat- or dairy-derived product into a pareve one. For example, rennet is sometimes made from stomach linings, yet is acceptable for making kosher cheese. Gelatins derived from kosher animal sources (which were ritually slaughtered) are also pareve. Other gelatin-like products from non-animal sources such as agar agar and carrageenan are pareve by nature. Fish gelatin, like all kosher fish products, is pareve.

Jewish law generally requires that bread be kept pareve (i.e., not kneaded with meat or dairy products nor made on meat or dairy equipment).

Kashrut has procedures by which equipment can be cleaned of its previous non-kosher or meat/dairy use.

For example, dairy manufacturing equipment can be cleaned well enough that the rabbis grant pareve status to products manufactured with it but someone with a strong allergic sensitivity to dairy products might still react to the dairy residue. This is why some products that are legitimately pareve carry "milk" warnings.

=== Cannabis ===
For cannabis grown in Israel, the plants must observe shmittah, but this does not apply to cannabis from elsewhere. At least one brand of cannabis edibles is certified to follow the laws of kashrut.

=== Tobacco ===
Although it is not a food product, some tobacco receives a year-long kosher for Passover certification. This year-long certification means that the tobacco is certified also for Passover where different restrictions may be in place. Tobacco may, for example, come into contact with some chametz grains that are strictly forbidden during Passover and the certification is a guarantee that it is free from this type of contamination.

In Israel, this certification is given by a private kashrut rabbinic group Beit Yosef, but the Chief Rabbinate has objected to granting of any certification by rabbis because of health risks from tobacco.

=== Genetically modified foods ===
With the advent of genetic engineering, scholars in both academia and Judaic faith have differing viewpoints on whether these new strains of foods are to be considered kosher or not. The first genetically modified animal approved by the FDA for human consumption is the AquAdvantage salmon and, while salmon is normally an acceptably kosher food, this modified organism has a gene from a non-kosher organism.

In 2015, the Committee on Jewish Law and Standards of the Rabbinical Assembly released a document regarding genetically modified organisms, stating that modification of gene sequences via the introduction of foreign DNA in order to convey a specific capability in the new organism is allowable, that entirely new species should not be intentionally created, and that the health implications of genetically modified foods must be considered on an individual basis.

Some put forth that this intermixing of species is against the teachings of the Talmud and thus against Jewish law and non-kosher. Others argue that the one in sixty parts law of kashrut is of significance, and that the foreign gene accounts for less than 1/60 of the animal and thus the modified salmon is kosher.

== Supervision and marketing ==
=== Hashgacha ===
Certain foods must be prepared in whole or in part by Jews. This includes grape wine, certain cooked foods (bishul akum), cheese (g'vinat akum), and according to some also butter (chem'at akum), dairy products (Hebrew: חלב ישראל chalav Yisrael "milk of Israel"), and bread (Pas Yisroel).

=== Product labeling standards ===
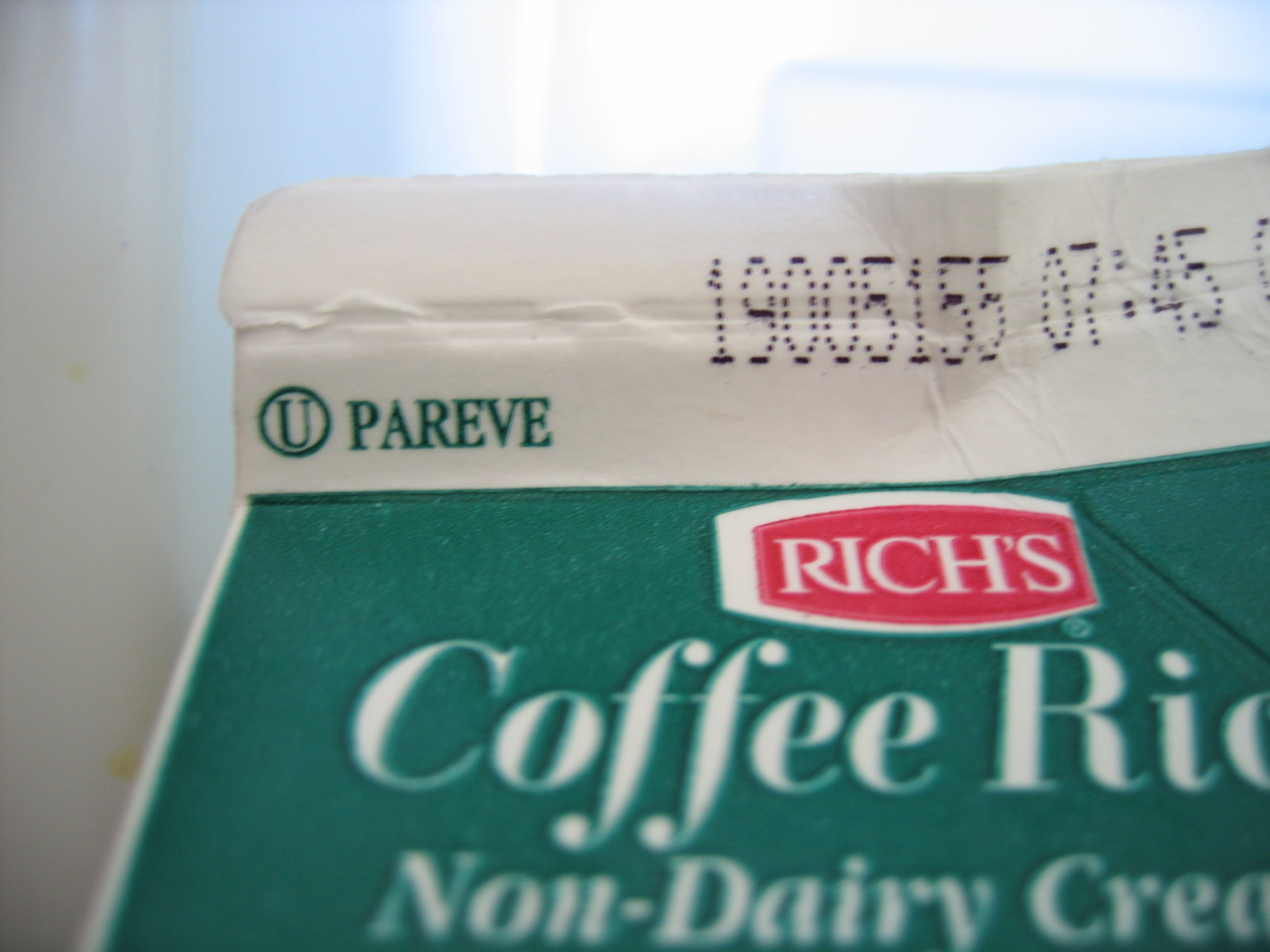
The circled U means a product is certified as kosher by the Orthodox Union (OU). "Pareve" means no ingredients are derived from milk or meat.

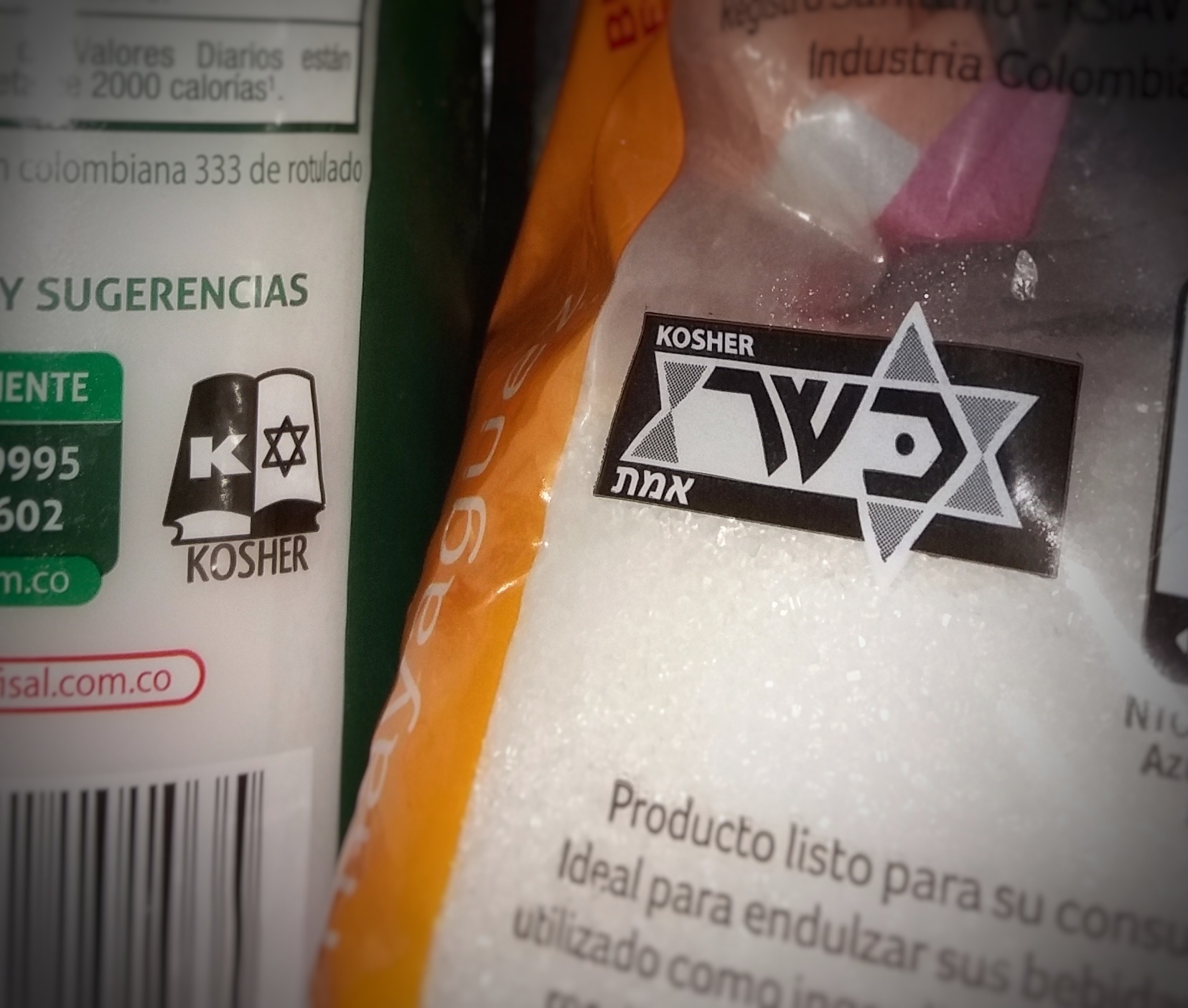
Kosher labels on salt and sugar packages in Colombia

Although reading the label of food products can identify obviously non-kosher ingredients, some countries allow manufacturers to omit identification of certain ingredients. Such "hidden" ingredients may include lubricants and flavorings, among other additives; in some cases, for instance, the use of natural flavorings, these ingredients are more likely to be derived from non-kosher substances. Furthermore, certain products, such as fish, have a high rate of mislabeling, which may result in a non-kosher fish being sold in a package labeled as a species of kosher fish.

Producers of foods and food additives can contact Jewish religious authorities to have their products certified as kosher: this involves a visit to the manufacturing facilities by an individual rabbi or a committee from a rabbinic organization, who will inspect the production methods and contents and, if everything is sufficiently kosher a certificate would be issued.

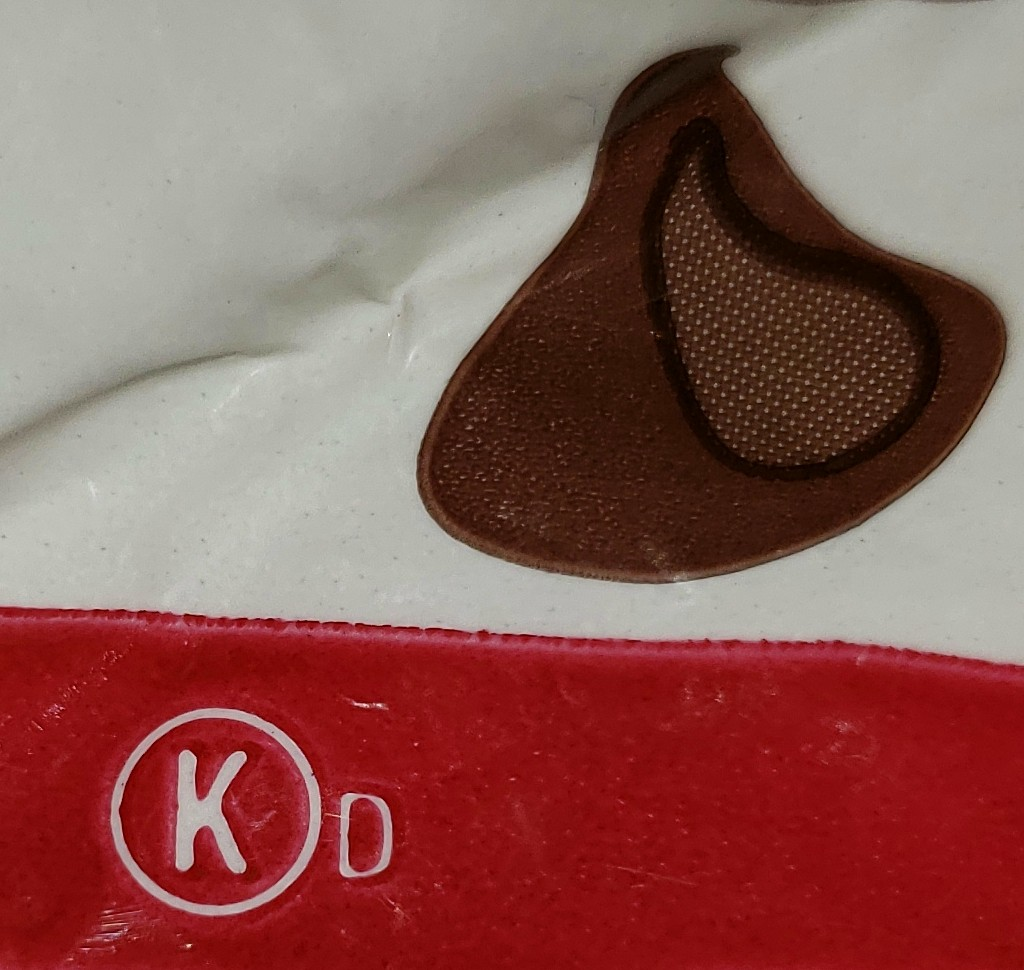
OK Kosher Certification (circled K) symbol with a dairy designation on a bag of chocolate chips

Manufacturers sometimes identify the products that have received such certification by adding particular graphical symbols to the label. These symbols are known in Judaism as hechsherim. Due to differences in kashrut standards held by different organizations, the hechsheirim of certain Jewish authorities may at times be considered invalid by other Jewish authorities. The certification marks of the various rabbis and organisations are too numerous to list, but one of the most commonly used in the United States of America is that of the Union of Orthodox Congregations, which uses a U inside a circle ("O-U"), symbolizing the initials of Orthodox Union. In Britain, commonly used symbols are the "KLBD" logo of the London Beth Din and the "MK" logo of the Manchester Beth Din. A single K is sometimes used as a symbol for kosher, but since many countries do not allow letters to be trademarked (the method by which other symbols are protected from misuse), it only indicates the company's claim that the product is kosher.

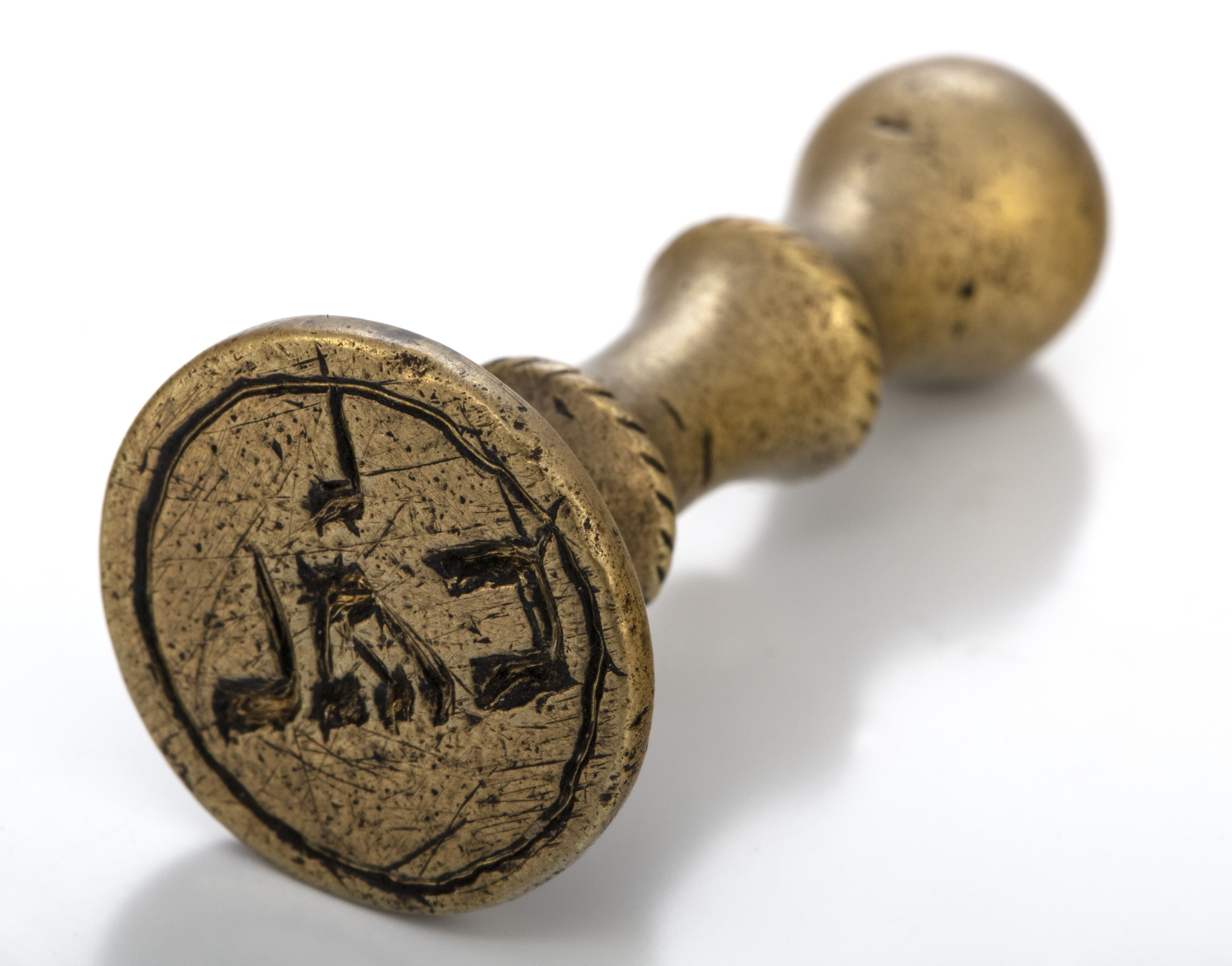
Stamp for identifying food as kosher. Collection of Auschwitz Jewish Centre

Many of the certification symbols are accompanied by additional letters or words to indicate the category of the product, according to Jewish law; the categorization may conflict with legal classifications, especially in the case of food that Jewish law regards as dairy, but legal classification does not.

- D: Dairy
- DE: Dairy equipment
- M: Meat, including poultry
- Pareve: Food that is neither meat nor dairy
- Fish
- P: Passover-related (P is not used for Pareve)

In many cases constant supervision is required because changes in manufacturing processes, among other reasons, products that once were kosher may cease to be so. For example, a kosher lubricating oil may be replaced by one containing tallow, which many rabbinic authorities view as non-kosher. Such changes are often coordinated with the supervising rabbi or supervising organization to ensure that new packaging does not suggest any hechsher or kashrut. In some cases, however, existing stocks of pre-printed labels with the hechsher may continue to be used on the non-kosher product. An active grapevine among the Jewish community discusses which products are questionable, as well as products which have become kosher but whose labels have yet to carry the hechsher. Some newspapers and periodicals also discuss kashrut products.

Products labeled kosher-style are non-kosher products that have characteristics of kosher foods, such as all-beef hot dogs, or are flavored or prepared in a manner consistent with Ashkenazi practices, like dill pickles. The designation usually refers to delicatessen items.

=== History of kosher supervision and marketing ===
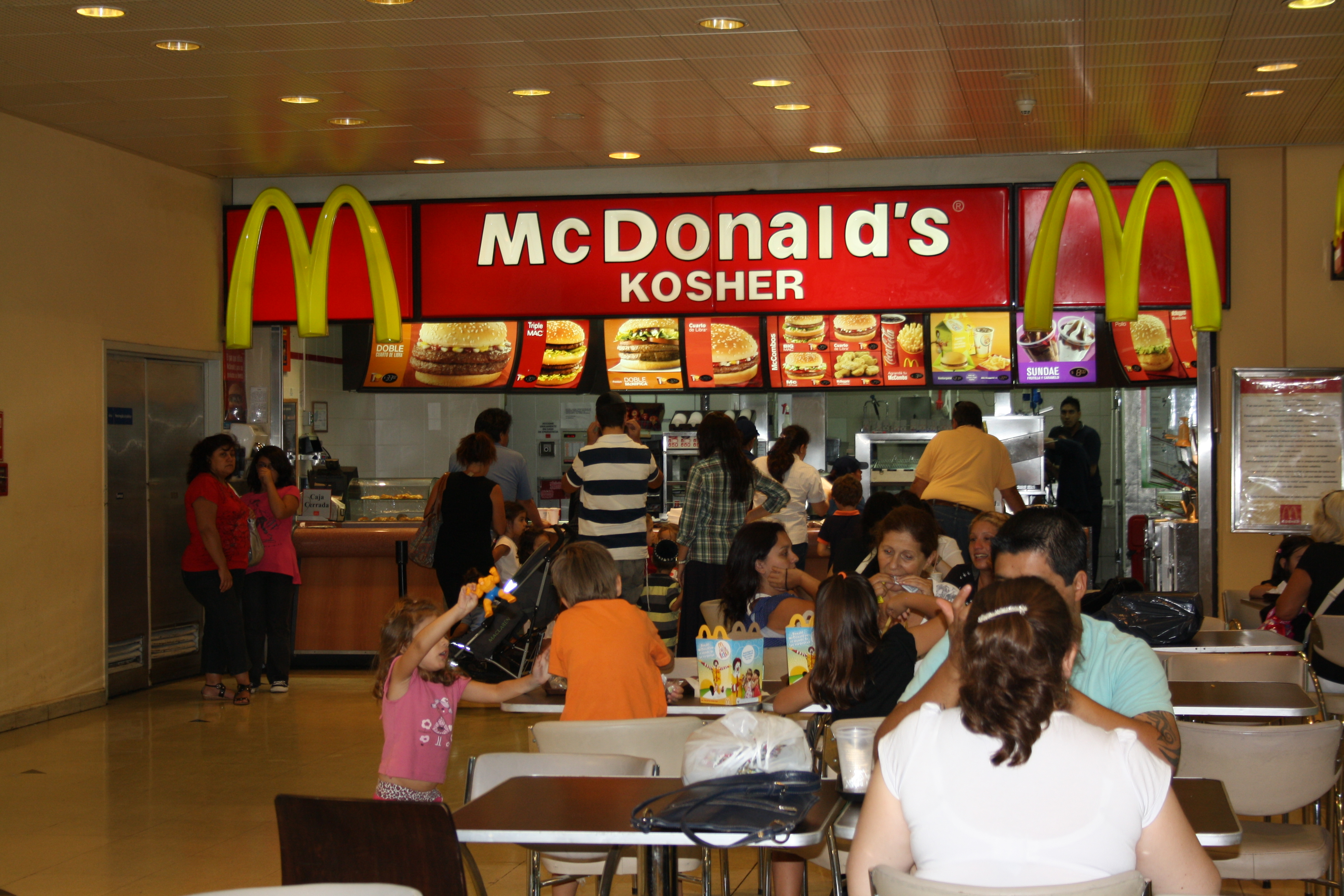
Kosher McDonald's in Buenos Aires, Argentina

Food producers often look to expand their markets or marketing potential, and offering kosher food has become a way to do that. The uniqueness of kosher food was advertised as early as 1849. In 1911 Procter & Gamble became the first company to advertise one of their products, Crisco, as kosher. Over the next two decades, companies such as Lender's Bagels, Maxwell House, Manischewitz, and Empire evolved and gave the kosher market more shelf-space. In the 1960s, Hebrew National hotdogs launched a "we answer to a higher authority" campaign to appeal to Jews and non-Jews alike. From that point on, "kosher" became a symbol for both quality and value. The kosher market quickly expanded, and with it more opportunities for kosher products. Menachem Lubinsky, founder of the Kosherfest trade fair, estimates as many as 14 million kosher consumers and $40 billion in sales of kosher products in the U.S.

In 2014 the Israel Defense Forces decided to allow female kosher supervisors to work in its kitchens on military bases, and the first women kosher inspectors were certified in Israel.

=== Legal usage ===
Advertising standards laws in many jurisdictions prohibit the use of the phrase kosher in a product's labeling unless the producer can show that the product conforms to Jewish dietary laws; however, different jurisdictions often define the legal qualifications for conforming to Jewish dietary laws differently. For example, in some places the law may require that a rabbi certify the kashrut nature, in others the rules of kosher are fully defined in law, and in others still it is sufficient that the manufacturer only believes that the product complies with Jewish dietary regulations. In several cases, laws restricting the use of the term kosher have later been determined to be illegal religious interference.

=== Costs ===
In the United States, the cost of certification for mass-produced items is typically minuscule and is usually more than offset by the advantages of being certified. In 1975 The New York Times estimated the cost per item for obtaining kosher certification at 6.5 millionths of a cent ($0.000000065) per item for a General Foods frozen-food item. According to a 2005 report by Burns & McDonnell, most U.S. national certifying agencies are non-profit, only charging for supervision and on-site work, for which the on-site supervisor "typically makes less per visit than an auto mechanic does per hour". However, re-engineering an existing manufacturing process can be costly. Certification usually leads to increased revenues by opening up additional markets to Jews who keep kosher, Muslims who keep halal, Seventh-day Adventists who keep the main laws of Kosher Diet, vegetarians, vegans and the lactose-intolerant who wish to avoid dairy products (products that are reliably certified as pareve meet this criterion). The Orthodox Union, one of the largest kashrut organizations in the United States, claims that "when positioned next to a competing non-kosher brand, a kosher product will do better by 20%".

In some European Jewish communities, kosher supervision of meat includes a "tax" used to fund Jewish education in the community, which makes kosher meat more expensive than the cost of supervision alone would imply.

== Society and culture ==
=== Adherence ===
Many Jews partially observe kashrut, by abstaining from pork or shellfish or by not drinking milk with meat dishes. Some keep kosher at home but eat in non-kosher restaurants. In 2012, one analysis of the specialty food market in North America estimated that only 15% of kosher consumers were Jewish. Kosher meat is regularly consumed by Muslims when halal is not available. Muslims, Hindus, and people with allergies to dairy foods often consider the kosher-pareve designation as an assurance that a food contains no animal-derived ingredients, including milk and all of its derivatives. However, since kosher-pareve foods may contain honey, eggs, or fish, vegans cannot rely on the certification.

About a sixth of American Jews or 0.3% of the American population fully keep kosher, and many more of them do not strictly follow all of the rules but still abstain from some prohibited foods, especially pork. The Seventh-day Adventist Church, a Christian denomination, preaches a health message which expects adherence to the kosher dietary laws.

Surveys conducted in 2013 and 2020 found that 22% of American Jews by religion claimed to keep kosher in their homes. Pork consumption in particular seems to be a bigger taboo than other non-kosher eating practices among Jews, with 41% claiming to at least abstain from eating pork. American Jews are generally less strict about kosher laws when compared to Israeli Jews. Nearly three times as many Israeli Jews reported that they commit to keeping kosher in their homes and 84% do not eat pork.

==== Differentiations in practice ====
"Kosher style" allows for variation in adherence to kashrut, reflecting different practices within the Jewish community. For some, kosher style implies abstinence from non-kosher animals, like pork and shellfish, and the avoidance of mixing meat and dairy in meals. These individuals may consume meat from animals that are kosher but not necessarily slaughtered according to kashrut standards.

The notion of "kosher style" serves individuals and communities navigating between strict religious observance and cultural identification with Jewish culinary traditions. Hasia Diner, a professor of American Jewish history at New York University, suggests that "kosher-style" represents a balancing act between tradition and assimilation, providing a sense of Jewish identity through food without strict adherence to kashrut.

This flexible practice emerged in the 1920s amongst Jews assimilating into American society, who sought connection to their heritage without fully observing dietary laws. The term is broad and encompasses foods that could be kosher, like chicken noodle soup or pareve meals (neither meat nor dairy), even if they do not meet halakhic standards. Diner points out the term is "oxymoronic," creating an illusion of kashrut where the true emphasis is on a style of cuisine rather than compliance with religious dietary laws.

Over time, the meaning of "kosher style" has evolved and expanded, reflecting changes within Jewish communities and broader society. In contemporary practice, "kosher style" is often encountered at social events and gatherings, where meals might exclude certain non-kosher items but not adhere strictly to kashrut. The exact definition may vary between communities and individuals, reflecting diverse interpretations and practices related to Jewish dietary laws. The term also relates to products marketed as "kosher style," prompting some regions to establish legislation to clarify labeling and prevent consumer misunderstanding. For instance, kosher-style pickles might be produced without kosher certification or supervision but are associated with Jewish culinary tradition.

=== Linguistics ===
==== Etymology ====
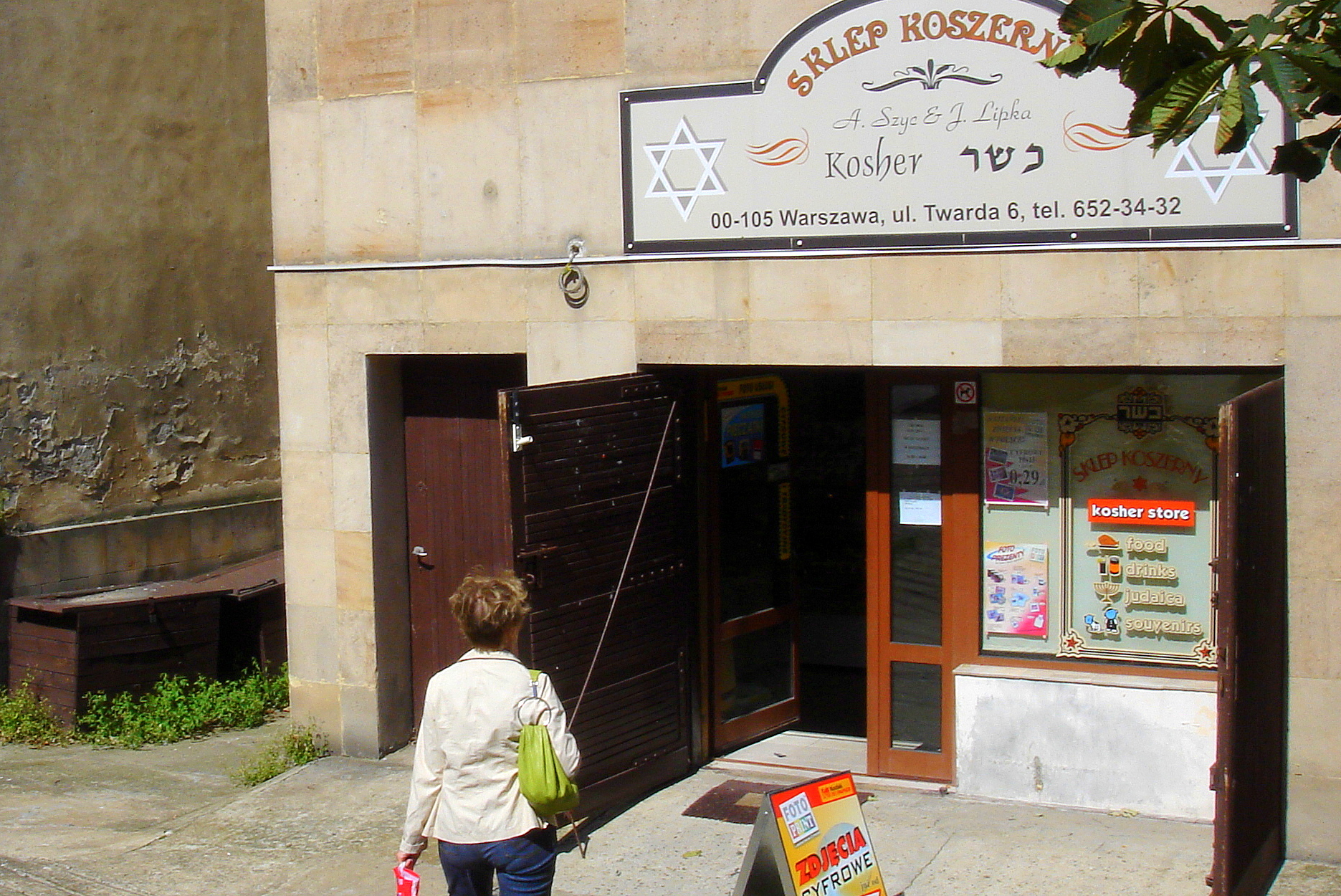
Kosher shop in Warsaw, using the Polish spelling of "kosher"

In Ancient Hebrew the word kosher (Hebrew: כשר) means be advantageous, proper, suitable, or succeed, according to the Brown–Driver–Briggs Hebrew and English Lexicon. In Modern Hebrew it generally refers to kashrut but it can also sometimes mean "proper". For example, the Babylonian Talmud uses kosher in the sense of "virtuous" when referring to Darius I as a "kosher king"; Darius, a Persian king (reigned 522–486 BCE), fostered the building of the Second Temple. In colloquial English, kosher often means "legitimate", "acceptable", "permissible", "genuine", or "authentic".

==== Kosher salt ====
Sometimes kosher is used as an abbreviation of koshering, meaning the process for making something kosher; for example, kosher salt is a form of salt with irregularly shaped crystals, making it particularly suitable for preparing meat according to the rules of kashrut, because the increased surface area of the crystals absorbs blood more effectively. In this case the type of salt refers to kosher style salt. Salt may also be kosher certified salt, or both. Certified kosher salt follows kashrut guidelines. Sometimes the term "coarse kosher salt" is used to designate salt that is both kosher style and kosher certified. The term "fine kosher salt" is sometimes used for salt that is certified kosher but not kosher style.

==== Pickles ====
Kosher can occur as a synonym for Jewish tradition; for example, a kosher dill pickle is simply a pickle made in the traditional manner of Jewish New York City pickle-makers, using a generous addition of garlic to the brine, and is not necessarily compliant with the traditional Jewish food laws.

== Strictness degrees ==
=== Mehadrin ===
Mehadrin is a term most commonly used with the meaning of enhanced or stricter kashrut rules. Its etymology is still debated, but its initial halachic use related specifically to lighting candles on Hanukkah. Later it became widely used in regard to dietary laws, especially in Israel, and ended up loosely covering almost every aspect of Jewish observance.

=== Badatz ===
Badatz is the Hebrew acronym of Beth Din Tsedek and is used as a name for organisations which supervise the production of kosher foods. They typically only certify mehadrin-level products, but are not the only agencies specialised in applying enhanced mehadrin rules, since there are non-badatz agencies also doing so.

== Suriname ==
A treef (Surinamese Dutch, derived from Sranan Tongo trefu) is a food taboo. In Suriname certain groups of people have long adhered to belief in treef, especially among people of African descent. The consumption of certain foods is prohibited, in the belief that it could cause major diseases, particularly leprosy. These prohibitions can vary individually, but it is inextricably related to conditions in the family. A treef is inherited from the father's side, but it can be revealed in a dream, often by a woman. In addition, a woman must take into account special food taboos during pregnancy. There is great importance attached to the treef; if a child observes the treef of his father, and yet experiences a skin condition, this is seen as a strong indication that the child was begotten by the woman with another man. Finally treef also be acquired later in life by wearing certain charms that compel you to abstain from certain foods.

The word is derived from Hebrew, due to influence of Sephardi Jews who came to Suriname in the 17th century. This is also the source of Sranan kaseri 'ritually clean, kosher'.

== Other uses ==
Although the term kosher relates mainly to food, it sometimes occurs in other contexts. Some Orthodox retailers sell kosher cell phones—stripped-down devices with limited features.

== See also ==
- Abomination (Judaism)
- Ahimsa (non-violence to living beings)
- Buddhist cuisine
  - Buddhist vegetarianism
- Christian dietary laws
- Comparison of Islamic and Jewish dietary laws
- Hindu dietary laws
- Islamic dietary laws
  - Halāl
- Jewish cuisine
  - Eco-Kashrut
  - Israeli cuisine
  - Jewish vegetarianism
  - Jewish Veg
  - Kosher certification agency
  - Sabbath food preparation
- Jhatka
- Kosher tax
- Kosher tax conspiracy theory
- Products without kosher certification requirements
- Taoist diet
- Treef
- Trefa banquet
