= Comparison of Islamic and Jewish dietary laws =

There are some noteworthy similarities between Jewish dietary laws and Islamic dietary laws. Both are meticulously descriptive and have like-minded concepts, but there are also several differences. In Judaism, dietary guidelines are primarily extracted from the Torah and the Talmud. In Islam, dietary guidelines are primarily extracted from the Quran and Muhammad's lifestyle.

Permissible foods and drinks are classified as kosher in Judaism and as halal in Islam, while non-permissible foods and drinks are classified as treyf in Judaism and as haram in Islam. Many Muslims consider kosher products to also be halal, with the exception of alcoholic beverages, which are forbidden in Islam. Religiously observant Jews, however, cannot consume anything that is not explicitly kosher.

The two religions have a particular slaughter method (shechita in Judaism and dhabihah in Islam) that requires the animal to be sacrificed in the name of God and killed in a way that drains blood, which is not permitted for consumption. If these guidelines are not followed, the animal's meat is rendered treyf or haram. Jews and Muslims are also prohibited from consuming an animal that was slaughtered by a non-believer (though some Muslims may exempt "People of the Book") or without due attribution to God. Additionally, the meat and by-products of certain animals—those that are designated as ritually unclean, such as pigs and predators—cannot be made kosher or halal at all.

In addition to kosher animals, Islam permits consuming some animals that are not permissible in Judaism, such as camels. With regard to seafood, guidelines differ between Sunni Islam and Shia Islam, with the latter being more on par with Jewish restrictions than the former. Islam also does not share the Jewish taboo on mixing dairy and meat. Both religions forbid the consumption of all insects except for the locust, which can qualify as kosher and halal.

== Permissibility of foods and drinks ==
=== Similarities ===
- Pork is prohibited by both sets of beliefs. Animals with fangs (i.e., cats, dogs, lions, bears) are also prohibited by both sets of beliefs, as well as amphibians and reptiles.
- Almost all animals that are kosher are also halal, such as bovines and bovids.
- To be kosher, aquatic animals must have scales and fins. Most Sunni schools of thought adhere to the interpretation that all creatures from the ocean or the sea or lake are considered halal (except Hanafi school that require it to be fish). Twelver Shia Muslims however consider that only sea creatures that have scales are halal, but make an exception with some crustaceans; shrimp and prawns, but not lobsters. This is similar to the Jewish law with the exception of fins.
- Gelatin, according to one of the two Islamic viewpoints, is only permissible if it comes from one of a specific set of animals. However, according to another Islamic viewpoint, all gelatin is halal due to a chemical transformation. In Judaism, kosher gelatin usually comes from the bones of a kosher animal, or is a vegan substitute, such as agar.
- Almost all insects are prohibited by both sets of law, although of the Maliki school of Sunni Islam permits eating insects, with the condition of it being dead by any means. The few kosher insects are specific types of locusts and grasshoppers (see kosher locust) which are not eaten today in most Jewish communities and it is unknown which species is permitted (the exception being the Yemenite Jews, who claim to have preserved this knowledge); however, all types of locusts are considered halal in sharia.

=== Differences ===
- For a substance to be halal, it must not contain alcohol of any kind. However, there is a difference drawn between the addition of alcohol to foods, which is absolutely forbidden, and the small quantities that naturally become present – such as orange juice. Except for grape wine and grape juice (which must be manufactured under Jewish supervision), kashrut allows the consumption of any sort of alcohol (besides Mezcal made with a worm/larva) as long as it has kosher ingredients (excluding any unsupervised grape extracts).
- The list of animals forbidden by kashrut is more restrictive, as kashrut requires that to be kosher, mammals must chew cud and must have cloven hooves. Thus some animals such as camels and rabbits are halal, but not kosher.
- According to Jewish dietary laws, cooking equipment cannot come into contact with both meat and dairy. Both the kitchen utensils and eating utensils used must be designated to either one or the other.
- Wine was very important in early Judaism. The Jewish Talmud stated that wine is an alternative to other medicines. Wine is permitted by all Jews as long as it is kosher. In order for wine to be kosher, it has to be made with all kosher ingredients and the entirety of the process from the picking of the grapes to the process of bottling the wine has to be supervised or created by other Jews. It is also a part of the Shabbat dinner and many other rituals. Especially the Passover Seder, where part of the ritual for Jewish tradition is for each person to drink four cups of wine. Grape juice is also an acceptable substitute for its alcoholic counterpart. Wine is also recommended to drink during the Jewish holiday of Purim. Meanwhile, in Islam alcohol is considered morally and socially unacceptable and is not used in any religious processes (the exceptions being Sufi Bektaşi, who encourage it as part of their beliefs).

== Method of animal slaughter ==
Shechita is the ritual slaughter of mammals and birds according to Jewish law. Dhabihah is the method used to slaughter an animal in Islamic tradition. Shechita requires that an animal be conscious and this is taken to mean the modern practice of electrical, gas, or percussive stunning before slaughter is forbidden. Most Muslim authorities also forbid the use of electrical, gas, or percussive stunning. However, other authorities state that stunning is permissible so long as it is not the direct cause of the animal's death.

=== Similarities ===
- Both shechita and dhabihah involve cutting across the neck of the animal with a sharp blade in one clean attempt in order to sever the main blood vessels.
- Both require draining the blood of the animal.
- Both Islamic and Jewish culinary practices enforce that the meat and poultry must be examined thoroughly by a member of its religion prior to consumption.
- Also, both religions emphasize that the meat has to be ritually slaughtered and not just found.

=== Differences ===
- In Judaism, only one who has been specially trained and has learned on all the laws of shechita may slaughter kosher animals. However, dhabihah can be performed by any "sane adult Muslim… by following the rules prescribed by Shariah". Some Islamic authorities state that dhabiha can also be performed by someone who follows any Abrahamic religion, known in the Shariah as People of the Book.
- Dhabiha requires that God's name be pronounced before each slaughter. There is a genuine difference of opinion regarding the mention of the name of God if slaughtered by a Jew or Christian. (see Islamic concept of God). However, the Muslim will be required to mention the name of God before consuming the dhabiha if not mentioned at the slaughter. (The matter contains detail not to be mentioned here for sake of simplicity.) Dhabiha meat by definition is meat that is slaughtered in the shariah manner and the name of God is said before the slaughter. In shechita, a blessing to God is recited before beginning an uninterrupted period of slaughtering; as long as the shochet does not have a lengthy pause, interrupt, or otherwise lose concentration, this blessing covers all the animals slaughtered in that period. This blessing follows the standard form for a blessing before most Jewish rituals ("Blessed are you God who has consecrated us with his commandments and who has commanded us regarding [such-and-such]", in this case, shechita). The general rule in Judaism is that for rituals which have an associated blessing, if one omitted the blessing, the ritual is still valid [see Maimonides Laws of Blessings 11:5]; as such, even if the shochet failed to recite the blessing before shechita, the slaughter is still valid and the meat is kosher.
- There are some restrictions on what organs or parts of the carcass may be eaten from a halal-slaughtered and dressed animal. Commonly known prohibition include blood (Qur'an 2:173), Hanafi school adds penis, testicles, vulva, glands. However, in addition to blood, kashrut also prohibits eating the chelev (certain types of fat) and gid hanosheh (the sciatic nerve), and thus the hindquarters of a kosher animal must undergo a process called nikkur (or, in Yiddish, traibering) in order to be fit for consumption by Jews. As nikkur is an expensive, time-consuming process, it is rarely practiced outside of Israel, and the hindquarters of kosher-slaughtered animals in the rest of the world are generally sold on the non-kosher market.

== Other aspects of diet ==
=== Similarities ===
- After slaughter, both require that the animal be examined to ensure that it is fit for consumption. Dhabiha guidelines generally say that the carcass should be inspected, while kashrut says that the animal's internal organs must be examined "to make certain the animal was not diseased".
- Both sets of religious rules are subject to arguments among different authorities with regional and other related differences in permissible foodstuffs.
- Strictly observant followers of either religion will not eat in restaurants not certified to follow its rules.
- Meat slaughtered and sold as kosher must still be salted to draw out any remaining blood and impurities. A similar practice is followed in some Muslim households, but using vinegar. This is done to remove all surface blood from the meat, in accordance with Islam's prohibition of the consumption of blood.

=== Differences ===
- In Judaism, the permissibility of food is influenced by many secondary factors. For instance, vessels and implements used to cook food must also be kept separate from non-kosher products, and not used for both dairy products and meat products. (If a vessel or implement used to cook dairy products is then used to cook meat, the food becomes non-kosher and the vessel or implement itself can no longer be used for the preparation or consumption of a kosher meal.) In general, the same policy extends to any apparatus used in the preparation of foods, such as ovens or stovetops. Laws are somewhat more lenient for certain kitchen items such as microwaves or dishwashers, although this depends greatly on tradition (minhag) or individuals' own stringent practices (chumrot). As a result of these factors, many Conservative and Orthodox Jews refuse to eat dishes prepared at any restaurant that is not specifically kosher, even if the actual dish ordered uses only kosher ingredients.
- Likewise, in Islamic food preparation, the permissibility of food is also influenced by whether or not it comes into contact with non-halal food or drink from utensils or kitchen surfaces. Utensils used for pork, alcoholic drinks, blood, or any other not-permissible substance must not be used for halal food.

== See also ==
- Legal aspects of ritual slaughter
- Kashrut
  - Ancient Israelite cuisine
- Islamic dietary laws
  - Israʼiliyyat, an Arabic word for Judaism-induced elements in Islam
