= Pas Yisroel =

Grain-products that were cooked or baked with the participation of an observant Jew

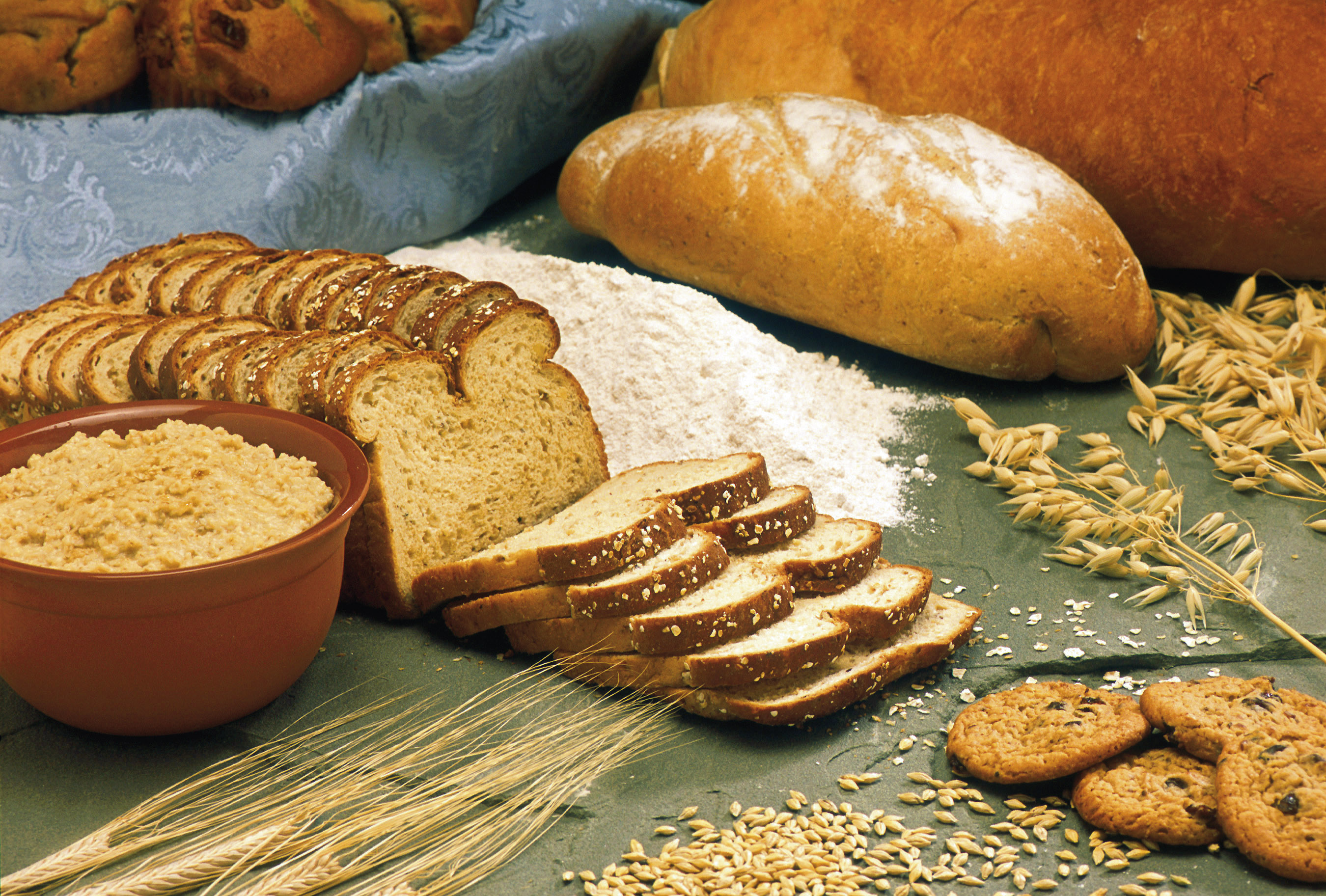
- Grain products

Halakhic texts relating to this article
- Mishnah: Avodah Zarah 35b
- Babylonian Talmud: Avodah Zarah 36b
- Shulchan Aruch: Yoreh De'ah 112:2

In Jewish law, Pas Yisroel or Pat Yisrael (Hebrew: פת ישראל, lit. 'Bread of an Israelite') products are grain-products that were cooked or baked with the participation of an observant Jew.

While any bread with kosher ingredients is considered kosher on a basic level, it is considered praiseworthy to fulfill the stricter standard of only eating pas yisroel. In the period between Rosh HaShanah and Yom Kippur, it is customary for all Jews to only eat bread which is pas yisroel.

== Definition ==
The observant Jew must, at minimum, ignite the flame used to prepare, cook, or bake the grain product. This requirement is considered restricted to the five species of grain – wheat, barley, oats, spelt, and rye. It also defines the fact that Hafrashat Hallah has been taken from the dough.

The qualification for one to be considered an "observant" Jew – and therefore able to uphold the observance of Pas Yisroel – is defined as one who is Shomer Shabbat. This is regardless of affiliation. An example of this encompassing multiple denominations is a hypothetical scenario of a Reform Jew who is a baker, and an Orthodox Jew who wants to buy the baked goods produced by the baker; if the baker is:

- considered Jewish, from the Orthodox Jew's perspective,
- considered Shomer Shabbat by the tenets of the Orthodox Jew,

then the grain-product could still receive a distinction of Pas Yisroel by the Orthodox Jew's preferred Hekhsher.

== Practical considerations ==
In the modern food-production industry, commercial bakeries may accomplish a status of Pas Yisroel by the use of something called the "Shain system" (named for the inventor, Rabbi Yehuda Shain), whereby an entire apparatus can be ignited remotely by an observant Jew.

== See also ==
- Kosher foods
- Kashrut
- Bishul Yisrael
- Kosher wine
- Yoshon
- Cholov Yisroel

=== Halakhic sources ===
- Shulchan Aruch, Yoreh De'ah 112 on WikiSource
