= Bishul Yisrael =

Halakhic food preparation prohibitions

Halakhic texts relating to this article
- Mishnah: Avodah Zarah 2:6
- Babylonian Talmud: Avodah Zarah 37b
- Shulchan Aruch: Yoreh De'ah 113:7, 113:16, and 118:12
- Other rabbinic codes: Yabia Omer, Vol. 5, responsa 20:7 and Igros Moshe Vol. 1,61

Bishul Yisrael (literally "cooking of Israel" - i.e., by a Jew) is a Hebrew term for one of the laws of kashrut in Judaism. The rule prohibits eating certain foods if they are cooked exclusively by non-Jews. The term is the opposite of bishul akum (cooking by a non-Jew), which the rule forbids (akum (עכו״ם) is an acronym of Ovdey Kochavim U'Mazalot (עובדי כוכבים ומזלות), literally "worshippers of stars and zodiac signs", but is actually a term for non-Jews).

This rule is part of a set of decrees instituted by the rabbis of the Talmud to prevent intermarriages with non-Jews. The prohibition of bishul akum applies to a formal meal prepared exclusively by non-Jews, even if the situation was one that had no other kosher food problems.

The prohibition applies only if the food is prepared exclusively by non-Jews. A small amount of Jewish participation can suffice to keep the food kosher. Different rabbis have different views on the absolute minimum: Sephardi poskim state that the minimum participation is to light the fire and place the pot on it to cook, while Ashkenazim are satisfied with merely lighting the fire, or even making a slight adjustment to a fire that was already lit by a non-Jew.

The law applies only to foods that, according to the Talmud, are "fit for a king's table" and are not generally eaten raw. Foods that would not be served at a state dinner are exempt from bishul akum, and are kosher even if cooked totally by non-Jews, provided that all the other requirements of kosher food are met. Maimonides explains that this prohibition was originally decreed in order to avoid a Jew being invited over by a non-Jew for a meal (which may lead to intermarriage), and people do not invite each other for dinner over food that is not "fit for a King's table" (Maimonides, Ma'akhalot Asurot 17:15).

In contemporary observance, mashgichim, along with supervising food preparation, typically help start the stove and/or provide other participation in the cooking sufficient to ensure that the rule of bishul Yisrael is complied with.

== See also ==
- Chalav Yisrael
- Kosher foods
- Kosher wine
- Pas Yisroel
