= Ben pekuah =

Category of kosher animal

In Jewish law, a ben pekuah (Hebrew: בֵּן פְּקוּעָה) is an animal fetus removed alive from its mother, shortly after the mother was slaughtered in conformance with the rules of shechita (kosher slaughter). According to Jewish law, a ben pekuah may later be slaughtered for consumption without adhering to shechita.

== Status under Jewish law ==
According to the Torah, all ruminants that have split hooves are permitted to be eaten. They must, however, be slaughtered in a manner prescribed by Jewish law, and certain parts of these animals, including certain fats and gid hanasheh (the sciatic nerve), may not be consumed.

Anything that is inside an animal at the point of slaughter is considered an organ of the animal. Therefore, if a mother was pregnant when slaughtered and a live offspring is removed, the offspring is considered a part of the mother. If the mother was slaughtered in adherence to shechita, then the offspring, a ben pekuah, is deemed already to have undergone ritual slaughter, and may therefore be theoretically slaughtered for human consumption without adhering to shechita. According to rabbinic law, if the animal is killed immediately there is no need to perform shechita. However, if the animal has started to walk it must be killed with shechita, but the animal's meat remains kosher even if the slaughter fails to conform fully to the regular requirements.

The offspring has the same status as the mother, so if the mother was found to be glatt kosher (smooth lungs with no lesions), the offspring is considered glatt even if its lungs are not smooth. The parts of an animal that are normally not permitted to be eaten, such as the gid hanasheh (sciatic nerve) and the chelev fats, are permitted when they belong to a ben pekuah, although its blood is still forbidden.

When a ben pekuah mates with another ben pekuah, their offspring is deemed a ben pekuah. However, when a ben pekuah mates with a regular animal, consumption of their offspring is forbidden altogether.

== Modern innovations ==
A company in Victoria, Australia, has attempted to build a herd of ben pekuah animals in order to reduce the cost of kosher meat. This effort met with considerable controversy and has yet to gain widespread rabbinic acceptance and had to close down. However, in 2021 there were efforts to revive the project under the auspices of Rabbi Oren Duvduvani.
