= Kosherfest =

Discontinued annual Kosher trade fair

- Status: Discontinued
- Genre: Exhibitions
- Frequency: Every November
- Venue: Meadowlands Exposition Center
- Location: Secaucus, New Jersey
- Years active: 1989–2022
- Inaugurated: 1989; 37 years ago
- Founder: Menachem Lubinsky
- Attendance: 6,000
- Area: 80,000 square feet (7,400 m^{2})
- Website: www.kosherfest.com

Kosherfest was an annual, two-day trade fair for the kosher-certified food industry held at the Meadowlands Exposition Center in Secaucus, New Jersey. Established in 1989, it included an exhibition hall, lectures, cooking demonstrations, a culinary competition between celebrity chefs, and new product awards. Kosherfest was considered a showcase for food trends and innovations in the kosher-certified food industry. The event was closed to the public, but admitted manufacturers, suppliers, wholesalers, buyers, caterers, retail stores, and media personnel, including photographers and food bloggers. Kosherfest was co-produced by Lubicom Marketing and Consulting and Diversified Communications. After its 2022 fair, Kosherfest was discontinued.

== History ==
Kosherfest was conceived in 1989 by Irving Silverman, who hired Menachem Lubinsky, President and CEO of Lubicom Marketing and Consulting, to market it. It was originally called the International Kosher Food and Food Service Trade Show. At its inaugural event, staged at the New York Passenger Ship Terminal, there were 69 exhibitors and 700 attendees. By 2001, the show was attracting 500 exhibitors and 12,000 buyers from across the United States and 29 countries at the Jacob K. Javits Convention Center. In 2014, 330 exhibitors and 6,000 registered attendees participated, filling all 80,000 square feet (7,400 m^{2}) of the Meadowlands Exposition Center in Secaucus, New Jersey.

In 2004 Diversified Communications of Portland, Maine, began co-producing the event with Lubicom.

Kosherfest announced that its 2022 trade fair was its last, and it was discontinuing.

== Location ==
In the 1990s, Kosherfest was staged at the Meadowlands Exposition Center, but moved to the Jacob K. Javits Convention Center in 1998, where it convened continuously from 2003 to 2007. In 2008 it moved back to the Meadowlands, where it was held until it was discontinued.

== Attendance ==
Attendance at Kosherfest was restricted to manufacturers, suppliers, wholesalers, buyers, caterers, retail stores, and media personnel, including photographers and food bloggers. The majority of participants were from the US, however exhibitors came from diverse countries including Finland, Argentina, and Japan. In 2014, a majority of attendees were Orthodox Jews. Kosherfest furnished areas for daily prayer services and stations for ritual hand-washing.

== Food trends and innovations ==
Kosherfest was considered a showcase for food trends and innovations in the kosher-certified food industry. At the first show in 1989, exhibitors displayed traditional kosher fare such as "gefilte fish, chopped liver, stuffed cabbage and kugel". Between 1992 and 1997 the number of kosher-certified food products grew from 26,000 to approximately 41,000. Along with the increase came more diversified fare, indicating that kosher "isn't just for Passover, or Jews, anymore". Among the products on display in 1996 were kosher-certified venison, gumbo, imitation crab, and faux caviar. The 2013 exhibition included kosher-certified kielbasa, "bacon" cheeseburgers, chorizo, Cajun beef sausage, and Asian sauces. Additionally, some of the food developers and vendors were not Jewish.

Later trends seen at Kosherfest included gluten-free foods (in 2013, gluten-free products represented nearly 20% of the foods on display), Greek yogurt, organic food, vegan offerings, and dairy-free products.

== Exhibition hall ==
With the abundance of free samples handed out by exhibitors in the exhibition hall, Kosherfest had been called "the world's biggest kiddush" and "a cross between a professional trade show and the buffet line at your cousin's bar mitzva". Samples ran the gamut from dairy to meat to pareve, including cheeses, sausages, sauces, pastries, ice cream, wine and liquor. Non-food samples included kosher breath strips, teeth whiteners, and kosher dog food. Show policy was to allow each attendee to take home one bag of free samples, and leftover food was donated to local charities.

Purveyors of food-service equipment, cleaning supplies, uniforms, paper goods, label printing systems, credit-card processing systems, and food-safety training also participated, as did kosher certification agencies looking to sign up new clients.

== Prizes ==
Kosherfest awarded prizes for best new kosher-certified products in 17 categories. These included Best in Show award, the best new dessert, the best new packaging design, the best new snack food, the best new organic product, the best new beverage, the best new food service product, best new dairy product, best new sweet snack, the best new mix, Best new dip, spread or salsa, the best new pre-cooked packaged meat, and best new pasta, rice and grain.

At the 2013 event, Empire Kosher set a Guinness World Record with their display of the world's largest chicken nugget.

== Other events ==
In addition to the exhibition hall, Kosherfest featured lectures, book signings by kosher cookbook authors, cooking demonstrations, and a culinary competition featuring celebrity chefs. Concurrent with the trade show, a Kosherfest social media dinner and the Kosher Food Bloggers Conference were held in off-site locations. Kosherfest was widely covered by media personnel reporting on kosher food trends.
