= Chadash =

Dietary restriction

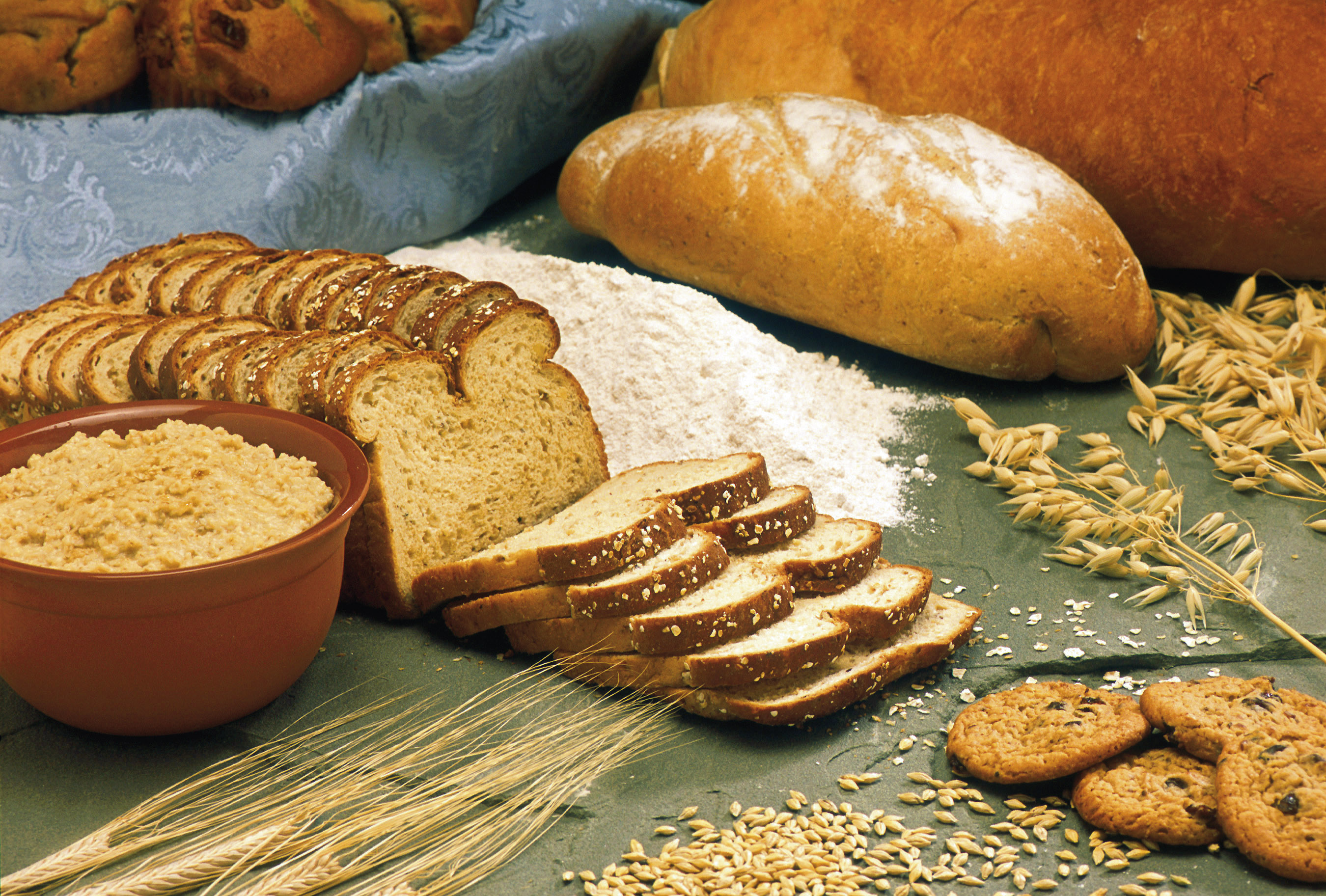
- Grain products

Halakhic texts relating to this article
- Torah: Leviticus 23:14
- Mishnah: Hallah 1:1, Orlah 3:9, Kiddushin 1:6, and Menahot 10:6–7
- Babylonian Talmud: Menahot 68b, Kiddushin 37a-38a, Keritot 5a
- Mishneh Torah: Maachalot Assurot 10:2
- Shulchan Aruch: Yoreh De'ah 293
- Other rabbinic codes: Sefer ha-Chinuch mitzvot 303–305

In Judaism, Chadash (Hebrew: חָדָשׁ, romanized: ḥāḏāsh, lit. '"new [grain harvest]"') is a concept within Kashrut (the Jewish dietary regulations), based on the Biblical requirement not to eat any grain of the new year (or products made from it) prior to the annual Omer offering on the 16th day of Nisan.

Grain products which are no longer affected by this law are referred to as Yashan (Hebrew: יָשָׁן, romanized: yāshān, lit. '"old [grain]"').

== The five types of grain ==
In Rabbinic Judaism, this requirement is restricted to the five species of grain – wheat, barley, spelt, rye and a fifth shibolet shual (which has been identified with oat, a species of barley called segala in Latin, and a kind of millet called sophonion in Greek). Any of these grains (or products made from them) that are too "young" to pass the requirement are referred to in Judaism as chadash "new [grain harvest]". Additionally, the rabbinic interpretation requires grain to have taken root (defined as either 3 days or 2 weeks after planting) prior to the Omer offering for it to become permitted; therefore, grains planted after Passover could only be consumed, at the earliest, twelve months later.

Following the destruction of the Temple in Jerusalem, the Omer offering was no longer offered. Instead, Rabban Yohanan ben Zakkai interpreted the Biblical law that the new grain harvest becomes permissible at the end of the day on which the offering was brought in ancient times. The Sages of Israel enacted a one-day further delay outside of the Land of Israel because of the extra day of holiday outside the Land of Israel.

== Outside the land of Israel ==
The applicability of the Chadash rules to grain grown outside the Land of Israel is a subject of debate among halakhic authorities. Although the Mishnah and Babylonian Talmud record a Tannaitic dispute about applicability outside Israel the majority of medieval Jewish scholars (e.g. Moses Maimonides, the Rif, and the Rosh) forbade its consumption. The later codifiers of Jewish law for Ashkenazic and Sephardic Jewry followed suit, both Rabbi Moses Isserles and Rabbi Joseph Caro declaring the stringent position.

Nevertheless, the same Rabbi Isserles (at least for Ashkenazim) also ruled that, because in general, in cases of purchased grain (with no other information) there is a double doubt as to

- whether the grain was harvested before Passover of that year (which would render it yashan) and
- whether, even if harvested after Passover of that year, it took root before Passover of that year (which would at least put its status in doubt)

the combination of doubts renders general grain permitted. However, many have difficulty understanding this double doubt, as in essence it is a doubt whether the grain is "old" or "new".

In addition a novel lenient approach was presented by Rabbi Yoel Sirkis who felt it is permissible if the grain originally belonged to a non-Jew. Additionally, the manner in which various foods have historically been available has meant that Jewish populations would need to risk starvation to pursue stringent compliance with this aspect of kashrut. All these factors led to a situation in which observation of the Yashan regulation was relatively limited until very recently (at least in the Ashkenazic community).

=== In Chabad literature ===
Rabbi Schneur Zalman of Liadi, the author of Tanya and Shulchan Aruch HaRav, quotes the basic opinion of Chadash being forbidden Midioraita and after considering the leniency of Rabbi Yoel Sirkis writes that - even for wheat harvested from a non-Jewish field – a "Baal Nefesh" (lit. an "owner of soul") should be scrupulous and not rely on lenient rabbinic opinions. Similarly, Rabbi Schneur Zalman notes in a responsum that in generations prior to his the custom was to take the lenient approach (i.e. rely on Rabbi Sirkis's leniency) but in his generation many have assumed the stringency of not consuming Chadash.

Rabbi Schneur Zalman's son, the Mitteler Rebbe, explains in a Maamar the important aspect of the Kohen bringing the Omer offering on the Mizbeach (from barley, usually used as feed) and only then is the consumption of wheat (usually reserved for human consumption) permitted.

From the writing of his followers, it has recently been published that Rabbi Sholom Dovber Schneersohn – the fifth Chabad Rebbe – was scrupulous in refraining from Chadash products when he attended a Siyyum of Yeshivah students.

== Chadash today ==
In modern times, particularly in developed countries, food is much more readily available than it historically had been, and grain is in sufficient abundance that many Orthodox Jews have become more interested in observing chadash restrictions. Modern packaging practices, which in some nations involve the stamping of production dates on every package, often allow individuals to determine whether food is definitely yashan (not "chadash"); packaging organisations sometimes add Kashrut information to the packaging, and sometimes include in this information whether the product is known to be yashan.
