= Nikkur =

Process of making animal meat kosher

Nikkur (Hebrew: ניקור) is the process of making an animal kosher by removing chelev (forbidden fats) and the gid hanasheh (sciatic nerve). The basis for this practice is Leviticus 7:23, "You shall not eat of any fatty suet, whether from cattle, sheep, or goats." The English word porge, or porging is from Judeo-Spanish porgar (from Spanish purgar "to purge"); the Yiddish is treibern (traibering in Yinglish). The process is done by a menakker.

== Etymology ==
From the Biblical root נקר NQR meaning to "put out, bore, dig, gnaw" etc.

== Regional practices ==
It is much easier to perform nikkur on the front part of the animal. It is also easier to perform on non-domestic animals such as deer as the chelev does not need to be removed from such animals. Since it is difficult to perform nikkur on the hind part of domestic animals, the entire hind part is usually sold to the non-Jewish market in Ashkenazi Jewish communities. However, among Yemenite Jews, nikkur on the hind part of the animal is still practised. This tradition goes back for centuries. While many Muslims today do accept food from People of the Book based on the Quranic precept, not all Muslim communities accept Kosher-slaughtered meat, including those hindquarters, as halal; communities that do not accept it include many on the Indian subcontinent. On the other hand, in countries like Israel, specially trained men are hired to prepare the hindquarters for sale as kosher.

== See also ==
- Chelev
- Shechita#Nikkur
