= Gid hanasheh =

Term for sciatic nerve in Judaism

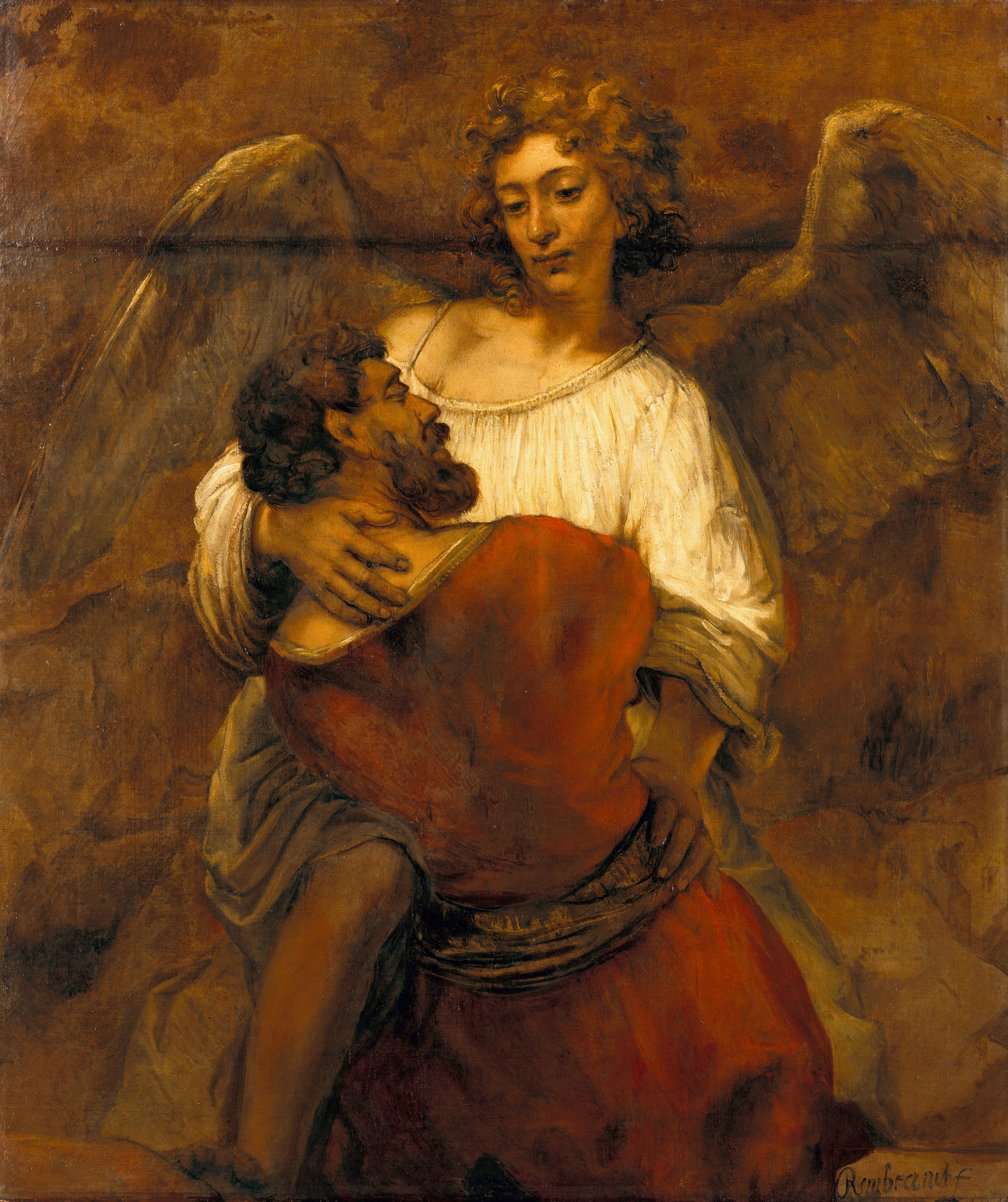
Rembrandt - Jacob Wrestling with the Angel - Google Art Project

Gid Hanasheh (Hebrew: גִּיד הַנָּשֶׁה Gīḏ hanNāše, literally "forgotten sinew", often translated as "displaced tendon") is the term for sciatic nerve in Judaism. It may not be eaten by Jews according to Halacha (Jewish Law). The laws regarding the prohibition of gid hanasheh are found in Tractate Chullin, chapter 7. From a medical and anatomical perspective, verse of Genesis (32:33) talks about the ligament of the head of the femur (round ligament of the femur, or ligamentum capitis femoris, or ligamentum teres femoris).

== Biblical source ==
The Torah (Genesis 32) recounts that Jacob fought with an angel (according to Rashi, this was Esau's guardian angel) who could not beat him. At the end of the fight, the angel strikes a nerve in Jacob's leg, causing him to limp. The verse then states: "Therefore the children of Israel eat not the sinew (gid ha-nasheh) of the thigh-vein which is upon the hollow of the thigh, unto this day."(Genesis 32:33)

== Interpretations ==
The Zohar explains that the thigh is the root location of sexual desire. While most evil urges can be overcome, there is one lust that is so strong that it overpowers even great men - the gid ha-nasheh. Its very name nasheh means “forgetting” (cf. Genesis 41:51), because once this desire has been aroused, we forget all rational thinking and moral scruples. The only way to win this battle is to completely distance ourselves from it. For this reason, the gid ha-nasheh is not eaten at all but entirely avoided.

Rabbi Abraham Isaac Kook argued that the prohibition of eating gid ha-nasheh is indicative of the principle that, while humans may need to slaughter animals for sustenance, they should not seek to subjugate other creatures, be they human or animal. To this end, the Torah prohibits eating the sciatic nerve, a nerve that enables an organism to stand upright.

== Removal ==
The removal of the gid hanasheh and chelev (forbidden fats) is called nikkur. Since it is labor-intensive to remove all the forbidden parts of the hindquarters of an animal, the entire hindquarters are usually sold to the non-kosher market, except in Israel and a few other markets with sufficient Jewish populations to justify the expense.

In the situation of a ben pekuah the nerve is permitted to be eaten. This potential reduction in expense is part of a project that began in Melbourne to create a herd of ben pekuah animals.
