= Chelev =

Animal fats forbidden by the Torah

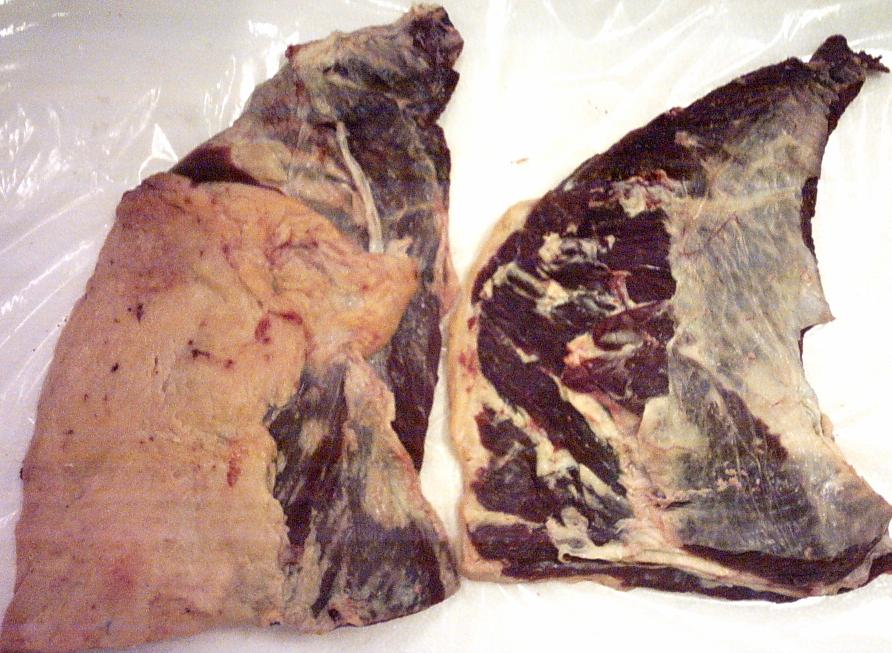
- Two pieces of flank steak. The left one is covered with a sheet of real chelev, the right one has only some non-kosher tendons (Krumim).

Halakhic texts relating to this article
- Torah: Leviticus 7:23–25
- Mishneh Torah: Maachalot Assurot 7:5
- Other rabbinic codes: Sefer ha-Chinuch mitzvah 147

Chelev (Hebrew: חֵלֶב, ḥēleḇ), "suet", is the animal fats that the Torah prohibits Jews and Israelites from eating. Only the chelev of animals that are of the sort from which offerings can be brought in the Tabernacle or Temple are prohibited (Leviticus 7:25). The prohibition of eating chelev is also, in addition to the Torah, one of the 613 commandments that, according to the Talmud, were given to Moses on Mount Sinai.

== Hebrew Bible ==
Speak unto the children of Israel, saying: You shall eat no fat, of ox, or sheep, or goat. And the fat of that which dieth of itself, and the fat of that which is torn of beasts, may be put to any use, but you must not eat it.

— Leviticus 7:23–24

== Hebrew language ==
In Biblical Hebrew, the word for fat is chelev (חֵלֶב), and it is first used for the "fats" of Abel's offering, and most often used for fats of animal sacrifices on the altar of the Tabernacle or Temple. The same word is also used in the phrase "the fat of the land."

== Rabbinical interpretation ==
The punishment for eating chelev bemeizid (on purpose) is kareth (exclusion from the after life). The atonement for eating it by mistake is to bring a korban hattath (atonement sacrifice).

The prohibition on chelev is only regarding those animal types which were used as a korban: cattle, sheep and goat, which are the only kosher domestic livestock. Fats from avians and deer may be eaten, and different types of bovinae are in a state of doubt.

Rabbi Abraham Isaac Kook suggested that the prohibition of chelev reminds us that we may only take the lives of domesticated animals for our essential needs. "We are permitted to slaughter these animals for their meat, to give us energy and strength, but … we should not kill them merely for the pleasure of eating their fatty meat, so pleasurable to the palate of the gastronome."

In order that fat should be considered chelev it must look like a sheet of fats, like a thick fibrous skin that can be removed (see picture). Some tendons and muscles are also removed due to the rabbinic law, since they are neighboring and resolving some chelev, namely the sciatic nerve.

The chelev must be removed by a qualified menaker in a process called nikkur (surgical removal).

=== Kidney fats ===
The fats surrounding the kidneys are called chelev hakloyoth, and are considered non-kosher.

=== Abdominal fats ===
The sheet of fat which is covering the interior of the abdominopelvic cavity is real chelev, except at some regions where it is covered with muscle, not with skin or tendon. However even where it is covered with meat, there is some fat which is still forbidden, since it could occasionally get uncovered while the animal walks. Therefore, one must be well trained in order to identify kosher fat.

=== Digestive system fats ===
There are many fats around the digestive organs such as the stomach and intestines, and one must be highly educated and trained in order to identify them.

=== Tail fat ===
The tail fat of the fat-tailed sheep, called alyah in Hebrew, is a large fatty membrane located on the hindquarters of certain breeds of sheep. The Torah uses the term chelev for this fat, but only in the sense of "the good part"; its consumption is permitted. The Karaites, however, understand this fat to literally be forbidden chelev, and thus do not allow eating the tail fat. Rabbi Judah HaLevi, in his 12th century work The Kuzari, questioned the practicality of the Karaite position: "Where exactly does [the prohibited fat] end? Some might prohibit only the tip of the sheep tail, while others the entire hind part."
