= Orthodox Union Kosher =

American kosher certification agency

Hechsher of the Orthodox Union
- Certifying agency: Kosher Division of Orthodox Union
- Founded: 1923
- Headquarters: 40 Rector St, New York, NY 10006
- Key People: Rabbi Menachem Genack (CEO); Rabbi Moshe Elefant (COO / Executive Rabbinic Coordinator); Rabbi Yaakov Luban (Executive Rabbinic Coordinator)
- Website: oukosher.org

Orthodox Union Kosher, known as OU Kosher or OUK, is an American kosher certification agency based in New York City. It was founded in 1923 by Abraham Goldstein. It is the certification agency of about 70% of kosher food worldwide, and is the largest of the "Big Five" major certification agencies, which include OK, Kof-K, Star-K, and CRC.

== Background ==
OU Kosher was founded in 1923 by East Prussian chemist Abraham Goldstein as the first independent kosher certification agency. Goldstein established the kosher certification program under the Union of Orthodox Jewish Congregations. The certification's symbol – the letter "U" inside of the letter "O" – was first placed on Heinz's vegetarian baked beans, confirming that their food was certified kosher.

In 1950, Rabbi Alexander S. Rosenberg joined the OU Kosher Division as rabbinic administrator. In his 22 years with the division, Rosenberg helped increase the number of employed mashgichim, or kosher supervisors, within the OU Kosher Division from 184 to 750, which helped certify over 2,500 products for 475 companies. During his time leading the division, Rosenberg set reforms in place to decrease the amount of corruption and fraud in the kosher certification industry. He ensured that local rabbis working for the OU were conforming to the uniform standards set by the division, and prevented bribery between food companies and mashgichim.

In 2012, the OU released the OU Kosher app, which gave consumers easily accessible updates on certified OU Kosher products, including which products are kosher, lists of newly certified products, and updated on products that are no longer certified.

As of October 2019, the OU Kosher Division is overseen by Rabbi Menachem Genack, who was appointed as rabbinic administrator in 1980. The organization now certifies close to 1,000,000 products in over 12,000 plants in 104 countries. With 886 mashgichim employed as well as over 50 rabbinic coordinators serving as account executives, the OU Kosher Division is now the world's largest kosher certification agency.

=== Women's contribution ===
In the early 1920s, the Orthodox Union Women's Branch was established, founded and led by Rebecca "Betty" Goldstein. The members of the Women's Branch produced pamphlets for Jewish women to follow kashrut in the home, as well as a series of kosher cookbooks. Since the Orthodox Union was urging women to keep their homes kosher, members from the Women's Branch wanted to ensure that the food products that were available also followed kosher requirements. The Women's Branch personally inspected food-manufacturing plants and insisted that rabbinical leaders within the OU expand its kashrut supervision efforts.

== OU symbols ==
Orthodox Union Kosher uses symbols to identify how a product is certified.

- OU: Product is Kosher Pareve which is neither meat or dairy.
- OU-D: Product is Kosher dairy (but not necessarily kosher for Passover). These products contain a dairy ingredient or a dairy derivative. It also means they could be made on dairy equipment. Dairy products may or may not be Chalav Yisrael.
- OU-DE: Product was made on dairy equipment.
- OU-Meat or OU-Glatt: Product is Kosher meat, has meat ingredients or is a derivative of meat. Alternatively, OU-Meat signifies that the product—while not containing meat ingredients itself—was made on equipment also used for making meat products.
- OU-Fish: Product is kosher with fish ingredients.
- OU-P: Product is Kosher for Passover. Passover products do not contain leavened grain (known as chametz) or kitniyot ingredients, and can be used year-around.
- OU-Kitniyot: Like OU-P, product is Kosher for Passover but does contain Kitniyot. Unlike chametz, some do eat Kitniyot on Passover.

== See also ==
- Hechsher
- Kashrut
- Kosher foods
- Mashgiach
- Orthodox Judaism
