= Seal-K =

Kosher certification organization

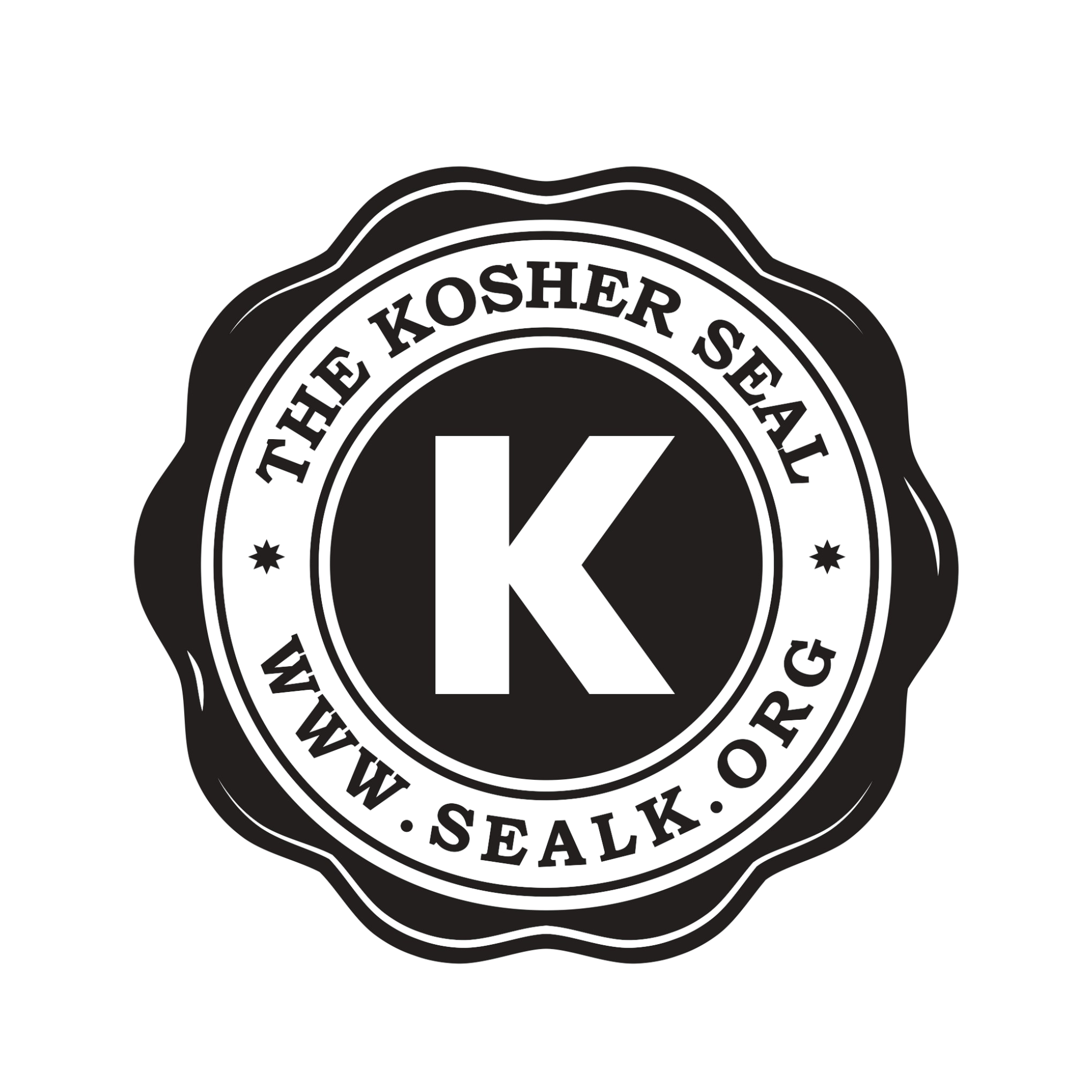
- Certifying agency: Seal-K Kosher
- Headquarters: 29 E Madison St #1818, Chicago, IL 60602
- Key People: Rabbinic Consultant- Rabbi Meir Ahron
- Website: https://sealk.org/

Seal-K Kosher is a kosher certification organization. The organization provides kosher supervision and certification for commercial kitchens, in addition to certifications for food production and shaatnez testing. The organization has its office in Chicago in 2021.

== Overview ==
Seal-K is a Jewish learning organization, which specializes in the study of practical halachah, although all Torah and halachic study are within its purview. As a kashrus agency, Seal-K follows a strict interpretation of Kashrut (Jewish dietary law) in its certification of contemporary food production. It is notable in its specific adherence to kosher standards without relying on kulos. The organization outlines its kosher standards in its website, one of the few kosher agencies to do so.

== History ==
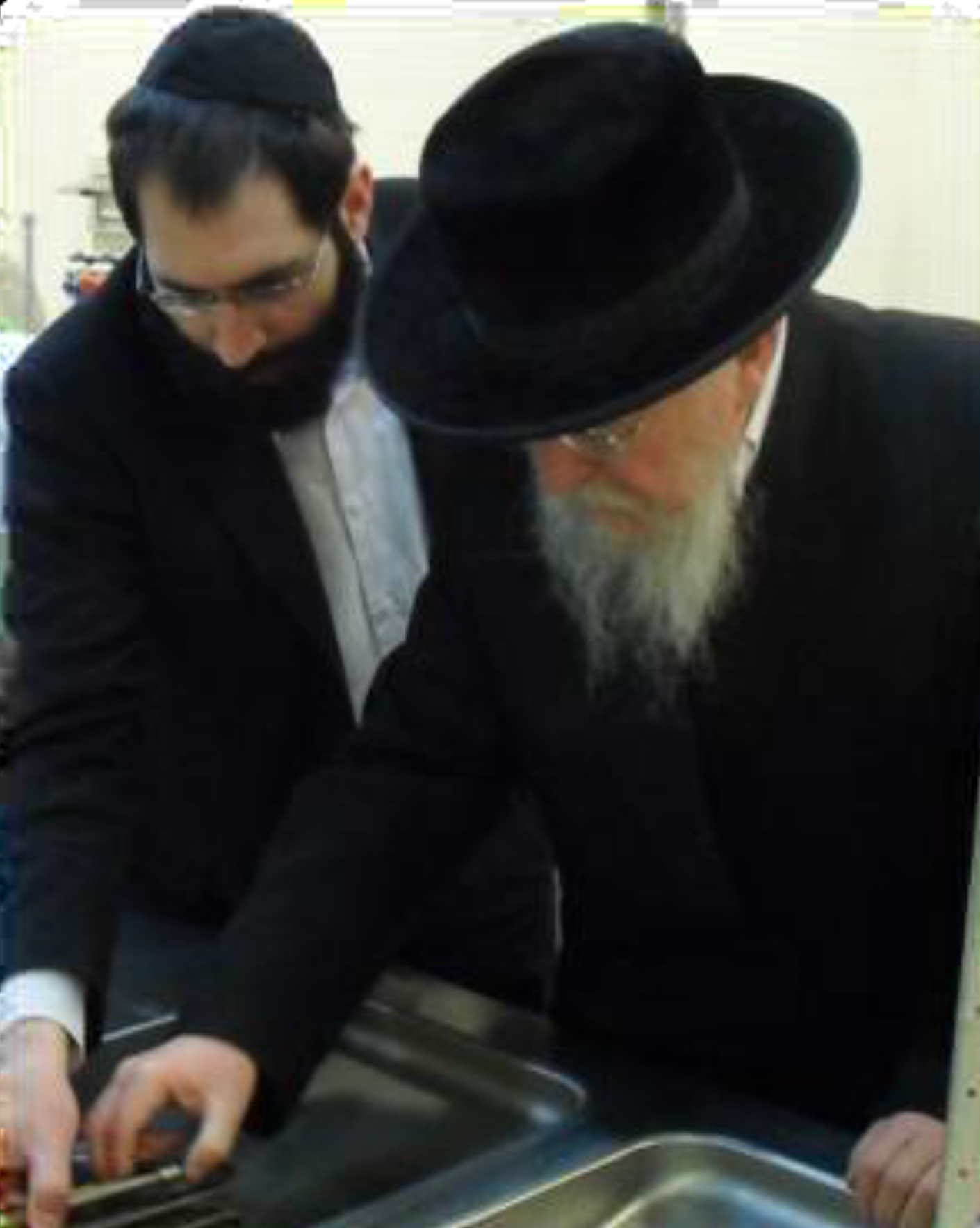
Seal-K Kosher - Kashering Inspection

Seal-K’s kosher certification operations grew from European hashgachah activities in the 1990s under Rabbi Bentzion Rabinovich, a long-time resident of Lugano, Switzerland, now of Jerusalem. Rabbi Rabinovich’s kashrus teams supervised small factories manufacturing chocolate, margarine, and wine, mostly for local consumption, in addition to airline food and a few hotel kitchens. Over time, the certification began to include up to 15 different hotel programs, such as summer, Passover and Sukkot retreats. An inquiry from the United States requesting commercial kitchen supervision brought the team across the Atlantic. The organization unites several rabbinic authorities together, each with his own area of expertise, under the authority of the Rabbi Bentzion Rabinovich.

Within Europe, the Seal-K now certify several seasonal kosher kitchens, including at The Grand Hotel Rimini, Grand Hotel da Vinci in Cesenatico, Hilton Sorrento Palace, Altafiumara Calabria and My One Kosher Hotel. In the United States, Seal-K certifies institutional food services, including a daily on-campus kosher kitchen at Northwestern University in Evanston, Illinois.

== Rabbinical Board ==
- The Biala Rebbe, Rabbi Bentzion Rabinovich- Member of the Moetzes Gedolei HaTorah.
- Rabbi Yehoshua Hartman - A Talmudic scholar and author of numerous commentaries on works by the Maharal of Prague.
- Rabbinic Consultants- Rabbi Meir Ahron - Rosh Kollel and instructor for the Chief Rabbinate of Israel.
- Rabbi Moshe Miller- Shaatnez expert and author of over twenty books on the kabbalistic philosophy.

== See also ==
- Chalav Yisrael
- Edah HaChareidis
- Kashruth Council of Canada
- Central Rabbinical Congress
- Kashrut
