= Tablet-K =

Kosher certification agency

- Certifying agency: Tablet-K
- Effective region: New York
- Product category: Food products
- Type of standard: Religious

Tablet-K is a kosher certification agency that was under the leadership of Rabbi Rafael Saffra until his death in 2009.

== Supervision and certification ==
Tablet-K certifies as kosher cheese products that are gevinat akum, cheese made without supervision by mashgichim. Many Orthodox Jews will not eat cheese that is gevinat akum, but the Rabbinical Assembly of Conservative Judaism allows for it as long as the cheese is made with non-animal rennet.

Tablet-K products are commonly available at Costco, often for dairy and fish products. Many cheeses produced by Cabot Creamery have a Tablet-K hechsher. In 2006, Cabot Creamery expanded its line of kosher products, with some cheeses receiving a Tablet-K certification.

== See also ==
- Hechsher
- Kashrut
- Kosher foods
