= EarthKosher =

American certification company

- Industry: certification
- Founded: 2004
- Founder: Rabbi Zachary Goldman
- Headquarters: Boulder, Colorado, United States
- Area served: worldwide
- Key people: Sholom H. Adler, kashrus administrator
- Website: earthkosher.com

EarthKosher is an American company providing kosher certification. The main office is in Boulder, Colorado, with offices in California, New Jersey, Mexico City and Jerusalem. It is a member of the Association of Kashrus Organizations.

Rabbi Zushe Yosef Blech was a rabbinic consultant of EarthKosher from its inception, and was the senior kashrus administrator from 2007 until his death in 2018. In 2022 the senior kashrus administrator was Rabbi Sholom H. Adler.

The company also certifies vegan, Paleo and non-GMO products. Since 2018 it has operated an online certification platform.

== See also ==
- Hechsher
- Kashrut
- Kosher foods
- Mashgiach
