= Kosher by ingredient =

Kosher by ingredient is an approach to observing the laws of kashrut that determines whether a food is kosher or not based on ingredient, rather than by the presence of a hechsher. This approach has fallen out of favor with Orthodox Jews, but is practiced by many Conservative Jews as well as by some Reform Jews and Reconstructionist Jews.

== History ==
For much of history, Jews who kept kosher commonly utilized a "kosher by ingredient" approach in many situations. Prior to the 20th century, hechsherim were not commonly used for commercially available foods. As late as the 1960s and 1970s it was common for Jews who kept kosher, including Orthodox Jews, to examine boxes and cans of commercially processed foods to check for themselves whether they considered the food to be kosher or not. The rapid rise of commercial kosher certification during the mid-to-late 20th century caused this approach to fall out of favor with Orthodox Jews by the 1980s. However, many Conservative Jews and some Reform and Reconstructionist Jews still rely on this approach. Few contemporary Orthodox Jews would purchase commercially processed food that doesn't have a valid kosher certification according to Orthodox halakha.

Individual non-Orthodox synagogues differ on their interpretation of when "kosher by ingredient" food is or is not acceptable. Some synagogues maintain a policy that individual members may keep kosher by ingredient, but if they prepare food for communal events such as synagogue potlucks, they must use food with a hechsher. Other Conservative synagogues may regard it as preferable to keep a kosher kitchen by hechsher, but do not consider a kosher by ingredient kitchen to be non-kosher.

Some Jews may keep kosher by ingredient for much of the year, but are stricter during holidays such as Passover and prefer to use hechshered products during those times. Others are strict with meat and will only purchase kosher meat that has been certified, but are otherwise lenient by using the kosher by ingredient approach for dairy and pareve foods.

Because eating out at non-kosher restaurants is a challenge for Jews who want to keep kosher, many prefer to eat at restaurants that are vegetarian or that offer foods that are kosher by ingredient. Jews who follow this approach at restaurants may inquire about the ingredients in a dish, or mention lactose intolerance or shellfish allergies, rather than explain in detail the laws of kashrut to the server.

== Foods ==
Vegetarian and vegan food is often kosher by ingredient. Some vegetarian foods, such as eggs from non-kosher birds or milk from non-kosher animals, may not be kosher by ingredient. Vegan food is more likely to be kosher by ingredient than vegetarian food, as vegan food does not contain eggs or dairy. Vegan or vegetarian food that is otherwise kosher by ingredient may be rendered non-kosher due to preparation by non-Jews or use of non-kosher equipment.

Most commercially available beers are kosher by ingredient, even if they do not have a hechsher. Ingredients that could render beer non-kosher include uncharacterized yeasts, extracts of hops and malts, and certain clarifying agents, among others.

== See also ==
- Kosher style
- Products without kosher certification requirements
