= Products without kosher certification requirements =

Aspect of Jewish dietary law

Products without kosher certification requirements are foods, drinks, and food products that do not require kosher certification or a hechsher to be considered kosher. Products that are kosher without a hechsher may nonetheless need a hechsher during Passover.

== List of products without hechsher requirements ==
Product	Notes
Aluminum foil	
Applesauce	Plain only, even with high fructose corn syrup and vitamins
Baking powder	
Baking soda	
Barley	
Beer	domestic, unflavored
Bran	unprocessed
Buckwheat	
Carob powder	
Cocoa powder	
Coffee	unflavored
Corn meal	
Corn powder	
Corn starch	
Dish washing gloves	
Farina	
Grains	
Honey	pure, unflavored
Lentils	raw
Lip gloss	even flavored
Molasses	unflavored
Mushrooms	sliced or unsliced
Oats	
Oven cleaner	
Paper	
Plastic	
Popcorn kernels	
Rice	raw or parboiled
Salt	
Silver polish	
Split peas	
Sugar	
Tea	unflavored
Water	unflavored, even with fluorides

== See also ==
- Hechsher
- Kosher by ingredient
