= Montreal Kosher =

Canadian kosher certification agency

- Effective region: Canada
- Effective since: 1922
- Product category: Food products
- Type of standard: Religious
- Website: mk.ca

Montreal Kosher, also known as MK Kosher, is a kosher certification agency based in Montreal, Canada. It was founded in 1922 by the Jewish Community Council of Montreal. As of 2025, it is the only Montreal-based agency recognized as acceptable by the Chicago Rabbinical Council.
