= Kashruth Council of Canada =

Canadian kosher certification agency

COR
- Certifying agency: Kashruth Council of Canada
- Founded: 1952
- Headquarters: 3200 Dufferin St, North York, ON M6A 3B2, Canada
- Key People: Rabbi Yacov Felder (Chairman, Rabbinical Va’ad Hakashruth); Rabbi Tsvi Heber (Director of Community Kosher); Rabbi Dovid Rosen (Kashruth Administrator / Director of Industrial Kosher)
- Website: cor.ca

Kashruth Council of Canada (better known as COR), is a kosher certification agency in Canada. It is best known for its kosher supervision service, with the COR symbol found on the labels of many commercial and consumer food products. The council serves 1,000 facilities that provide 70,000 products to Canadian consumers. As of September 2014, COR employs 70 full-time and part-time mashgichim who work in local food service and catering venues, plus approximately 30 mashgichim worldwide who supervise COR-certified manufacturing plants. COR supervises food at event venues such as the Rogers Centre, the Scotiabank Arena and the Toronto Zoo. In total, COR certifies 53 restaurants in Toronto. COR, in conjunction with Liaison Culinary College, has a college accredited training program for its mashgichim.

== History ==
COR was founded in November 1952. Before that, it was hard to get legitimately kosher meat in Toronto because there was no regulation. The Canadian Jewish Congress was asked to set up a system to ensure legitimacy of the kosher status of meat in Toronto. In 1954, a Rabbinical Board called the "Vaad Hakashruth of the Canadian Jewish Congress of the Central Region" was established. It then consisted of 12 Rabbis, having grown to 26 members as of 2017. In June 1956, the name of the Vaad Hakashruth was changed to the Council of Orthodox Rabbis, the source of the abbreviation COR. In the early 1960s, COR successfully appealed to Prime Minister John G. Diefenbaker to have Shechita legally approved by the federal government and protected by Canadian law. For many years, Rabbi Gedalia Felder was the chairman of the Vaad Hakashruth, and in 2006, his son Rabbi Yacov Felder became the vice chairman, and eventually the chairman.

== See also ==
- Kosher certification agency
