= Kosher Check =

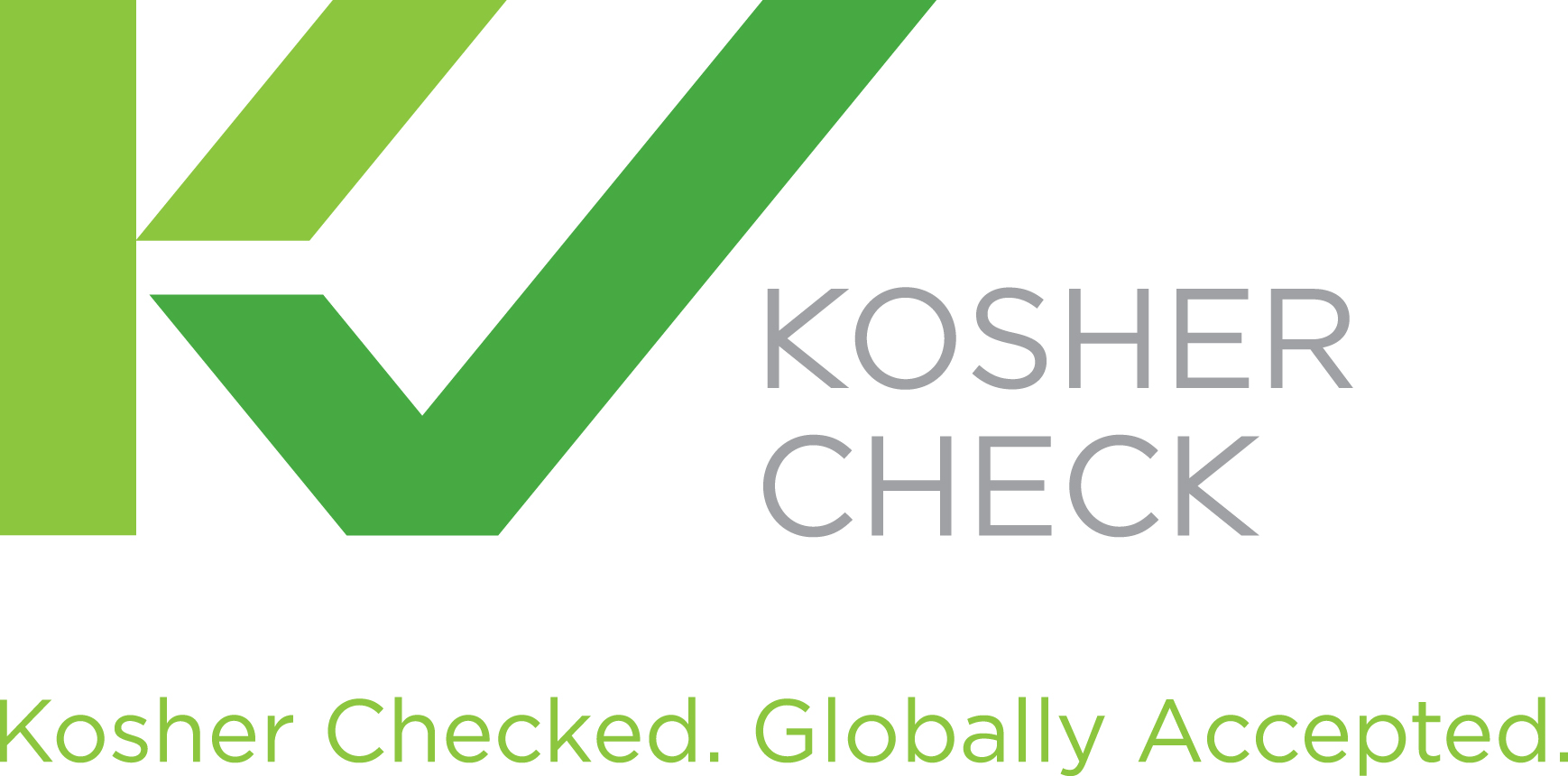
- Certifying agency: Orthodox Rabbinical Council of British Columbia
- Effective since: November 2013
- Predecessor: BC Kosher
- Product category: Food products
- Website: koshercheck.org

Kosher Check is a hechsher of the Orthodox Rabbinical Council of British Columbia. Its symbol is used on labels of food which are certified Kosher by the Council. Kosher Check is headquartered in Vancouver, British Columbia.

Kosher Chek has an international network of regional coordinators and Rabbinic representatives, all of them strictly Orthodox in their personal practice. Regional coordinators are based in Asia, Europe, and North America.

In November 2013 BC Kosher was renamed Kosher Check with the tagline "Kosher Checked. Globally Accepted," and the new symbol was introduced. The hechsher is only available to manufacturers of food that have enhanced food-safety protocols. Today Kosher Check certifies thousands of products produced by manufacturers all around the world.

== See also ==
- Food safety
- Hechsher
- Kashrut
- Orthodox Judaism
