= Menachem Genack =

American rabbi

Rabbi Menachem Genack

Religious life
- Religion: Judaism
- Denomination: Orthodox
- Position: CEO / Rabbinic Administrator
- Organisation: Orthodox Union Kosher

Rabbi Menachem Genack (born 1949) is an American Orthodox rabbi and the CEO of the Orthodox Union Kosher Division, a supervisory organization of kosher foods. As such he oversees the kosher certification of over 1.3 million products and over 14,000 facilities in 104 countries.

In addition to his role at the Orthodox union (OU Kosher), he gives a Yoreh Deah shiur for ordination students at Yeshiva University and is a member of the board of trustees and professor of Talmud at Touro College, from which he received an honorary doctorate in 1998. Rabbi Genack was founding chairman of NORPAC, a pro-Israel political action committee. He is on the executive committee of American Israel Public Affairs Committee.

An author and talmudic scholar, Rabbi Genack has published over 180 articles on Jewish thought and law, and is on the editorial board of Yeshiva University’s publication Tradition, A Journal of Orthodox Jewish Thought. The author of three halachic works: Birkat Yitchak, Gan Shoshanim, and Chazon Nachum, Rabbi Genack is also the co-editor of the Torah journal Mesorah.

In 2008 The Jewish Daily Forward listed him as one of the "Forward 50," the fifty most influential Jews in the United States.

Rabbi Genack lives in Englewood, New Jersey, where he has been rabbi of Congregation Shomrei Emunah since 1985.

== Disciple of Joseph B. Soloveitchik ==
Rabbi Genack, a close disciple of Rabbi Joseph B. Soloveitchik, was known as one of his foremost students from whom he received semicha Yoreh Yoreh Yadin Yadin. In his semicha, Rav Soloveitchik wrote: “He dives to the depths of the halacha and emerges with pearls and jewels. Not every day does one encounter a scholar of his caliber.”

Rabbi Genack aided the Rav in editing the Rav’s Shiurim l’Zecher Aba Mori and encouraged him to publish them. When the shiurim were reprinted, Rav Soloveitchik wrote a letter to Rabbi Genack thanking him for his help. He also edited Rabbi Joseph Soloveitchik, Man of Halacha, Man of Faith.

== Work with New Jersey Governor Corzine ==
In 2006, Rabbi Genack delivered the Benediction at the inaugural ceremony for Governor Jon Corzine in Trenton. He was on the governor-elect's transition team for the Department of Corrections, the second largest item in the New Jersey budget.

== Dialogue with former President Bill Clinton ==
In 1993 Rabbi Genack wrote Letters to President Clinton: Biblical Lessons on Faith and Leadership, a written dialogue between Rabbi Genack and former President Bill Clinton over a period of 15 years. The two men met when then-governor Clinton was just beginning his road to the White House. The rabbi began sending Clinton brief essays highlighting spiritual insights from the Bible to help him navigate difficult decisions and issues. During his second term, the president asked Rabbi Genack to write these pieces more regularly and formally, and the rabbi invited Bible scholars, political leaders, scientists, clergy members, and laypeople to contribute.

== Published works ==
=== Books ===
- Birkat Yitzchak – Chidushim U-ve’urim al HaTorah
- Birkat Yitzchak – The Four Parshiyot
- Birkat Yitzchak on Sanhedrin
- Gan Shoshanim-2
- Chazon Nachum
- Letters to President Clinton: Biblical Lessons on Faith and Leadership
- Man of Halacha Man of Faith
- The Seder Night: An Exalted Evening
