= Moshe Heinemann =

Rabbi Moshe Heinemann

Personal life
- Born: Fürth, Germany
- Parent(s): Benno Heinemann, Freida Schild
- Education: Beth Medrash Govoha

Religious life
- Religion: Judaism
- Denomination: Orthodox
- Synagogue: Agudath Israel of Baltimore
- Organization: Star K
- Residence: Baltimore, Maryland
- Semikhah: Rabbi Moshe Feinstein

Rabbi Moshe Heinemann is a German-American Orthodox rabbi and Posek who heads the Agudath Israel of Baltimore synagogue and is the rabbinical supervisor of the Star K kashrus certification agency. He studied for many years in Beis Midrash Govoha under Rabbi Aharon Kotler, and was ordained by Rabbi Moshe Feinstein.

He was born in Fürth, Germany in 1937. Moshe left with his parents for England shortly after Kristallnacht. They lived in England until the 1950s.

Rabbi Heinemann is widely consulted for rulings in matters of Halacha, often where complicated technology is involved. He is an expert Mohel, Shochet, and Sofer, and has trained and certified numerous people in these, as well as other, areas of practical Halacha. Rabbi Heinemann is also an expert on the construction of Eruvin and mikvehs, and is frequently consulted regarding these complicated areas of Halacha.

== Shabbos Mode Ovens ==
Rabbi Heinemann has ruled for over a decade that, on Yom Tov, one may raise or lower the temperature on Sabbath Mode ovens. In June 2008, a number of prominent Poskim signed a Kol Kore (public pronouncement) stating that this was unequivocally forbidden. The Kol Kore referred to the lenient opinion as a Daas Yachid (a minority opinion that should not be relied upon - literally: the opinion of an individual). The website of the Star-K, the Supervision Agency that is governed by Rabbi Heinemann's rulings, continues to promote Rabbi Heinemann's view.

== Audio Lectures ==
- MP3 shiurim by Rabbi Moshe Heinemann
