= Kof-K =

Kosher certification agency in New Jersey, U.S.

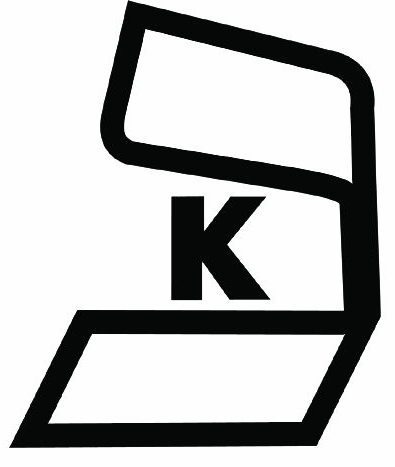
- Founded: 1970
- Headquarters: 201 The Plaza, Teaneck, NJ 07666
- Key People: Rabbi Ari Senter; Rabbi Daniel Senter
- Website: https://www.kof-k.org/

Kof-K, a Teaneck, New Jersey–based Kosher certification agency, is one of the "Big Five" kosher certification agencies in the United States.

As of 2010, more than one third of all food sold in the United States has kosher supervision, 80% of it from one of the "Big Five."

Its founder and rabbinic administrator was Rabbi Dr. Harvey (Zecharia) Senter, who died April 4, 2021 (אחרון של פסח). It is now headed by two of his sons Rabbi Daniel and Ari Senter.

While the Kof-K's certification is largely for products, they also certify kosher eateries.

== See also ==
- Hechsher
