= Star-K =

American kosher certification agency

Star-K Kosher Certification
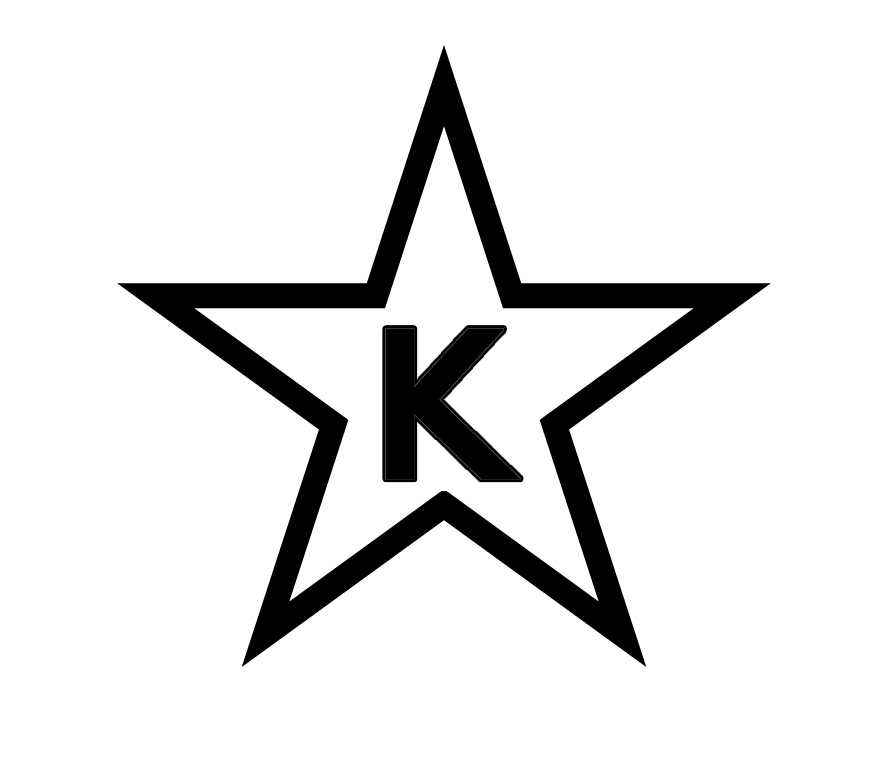
- Certifying agency: Vaad Hakashrus of Baltimore
- Headquarters: 122 Slade Ave #300, Baltimore, MD 21208
- Key People: Rabbi Moshe Heinemann (Rabbinic Administrator); Dr. Avrom Pollak (President)
- Website: star-k.org

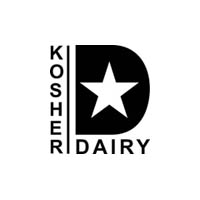
Star-D symbol as found on certified products

Star-K Kosher Certification, also known as the Vaad Hakashrus of Baltimore (Hebrew: ועד הכשרות דבאלטימאר), is an American kosher certification agency based in Baltimore, Maryland, under the administration of Rabbi Moshe Heinemann, with the involvement of many other rabbis. It is one of the largest Jewish dietary certification agencies in North America. It is trusted by many Orthodox Jews worldwide for dedication to preserving Kashrut. The organization supervises tens of thousands of commercial food products and food establishments (such as restaurants and caterers) around the world.

== Other certifications ==
The organization also provides other kosher certification labels:

=== Star-D ===
Star-D supervision is provided for certain non–Cholov Yisroel dairy products and establishments. Traditional Star-K certification may be applied only if the product is chalav yisrael (that is, milk that has been milked under the supervision of a religiously observant Jew). Star-D products need not be chalav yisrael, though they must meet all other Star-K standards.

The Star-D label is administered by the Star-K but sponsored by the National Council of Young Israel of the United States, and many well-known brands have qualified for Star-D certification. Rav Naftali Burnstein, Shlita, Rav of Young Israel of Cleveland, is the Rav HaMachshir.

=== Star-S ===
Star-S is another Star-K certification label. It is provided for products that are Kosher for Passover but with kitniyot ingredients.

Like those marked with the OU's OU-Kitniyot label, these products are permitted to Sephardi but not to Ashkenazi Jews on Passover.

== History ==
The organization, led then as now by Rabbi Heinemann, was previously named Vaad Hakashrus.
