= Civil laws regarding kashrut =

Civil laws regarding kashrut (Jewish religious standards, mainly concerning food) are found in several countries. Advertising standards laws in many jurisdictions prohibit the use of the phrase "kosher" in a product's labelling, unless it can be shown that the product conforms to Jewish dietary laws; however, the legal qualifications for conforming to Jewish dietary laws are often defined differently in different jurisdictions.

For example, in some places the law may require that a rabbi certify the kashrut nature, in others the rules of kosher are fully defined in law, and in others still it is sufficient that the manufacturer only believes that the product complies with Jewish dietary regulations.

In several cases, laws restricting the use of the term "kosher" have later been determined to be illegal religious interference.

== United States ==
Historically, the statutes of some states in the United States attempted to define the term "kosher", and make it a felony to sell a product which was called kosher if, in general, it was not processed in accordance with the Jewish religion. However, challenges were made to such laws on the basis that they appear to be establishment of a religious practice by the states in question, which would constitute a violation of the constitutional rule that there should be no law respecting an establishment of religion.

Although earlier courts upheld some of these laws, courts have since determined that the laws would establish religious practice, and therefore struck the laws down; opponents of this decision had attempted to argue that kashrut was simply a set of standards for food preparation, and therefore there would be no difference between labelling something as kashrut and labelling it as low-sodium, high-fiber, pasteurised, calcium-enriched, or "contains no cholesterol".

The legal rulings include:

- The ordinance of Baltimore City which created a kosher law being found to be unconstitutional
- New Jersey's kosher laws being found to violate the establishment clauses of both the New Jersey state constitution and the First Amendment.
  The opinion was affirmed by the New Jersey Supreme Court in which it found that the State's use of "Orthodox Jewish law" as a basis for the definition of kosher was an adoption of substantive religious standards which violated the state and federal constitutions.
  The State's response was to create a new law which avoids any definition of a what is or is not "kosher". Instead, businesses which claim to be kosher must provide details about what they mean by "kosher", and the State will check to ensure that this standard is adhered to. For example, kosher restaurants must display a poster on which they display the name of their rabbinic certifier, how often he inspects the establishment, whether or not he requires all ingredients to be kosher-supervised, and so on.
  In this manner, government enforcement becomes a consumer-protection issue, and avoids the problems of advancing any particular religious view.
- The United States Court of Appeals for the Second Circuit finding that the challenged provisions of New York's Kosher Fraud law "on their face violate the Establishment Clause because they excessively entangle the State of New York with religion and impermissibly advance Orthodox Judaism".
  The Supreme Court refused to hear the case, and denied certiorari. The statute has since been revised and a new statute, The McKinney's Agriculture and Markets Law Sec. 201-a, has since been passed.
  Under the new law, the state merely maintains a database of certification organizations and products.

See also, The Constitutional Complexity of Kosher Food Laws

== See also ==
- Legal aspects of ritual slaughter
- Kashrut
- Kosher food
