= Chalav Yisrael =

Category of dairy products in Judaism

Halakhic texts relating to this article
- Mishnah: Avodah Zarah chapter 2, Mishnah 6
- Babylonian Talmud: Avodah Zarah 35b, 39b
- Shulchan Aruch: Yoreh De'ah 115:1

Chalav Yisrael (Hebrew: חֲלַב יִשְׂרָאֵל), also pronounced cholov Yisroel, refers to kosher milk whose milking was observed by an observant Jew. The takkanah of chalav Yisrael, which originates in the Mishnah and Talmud, was instituted due to a concern that a non-Jew might mix milk of a non-kosher animal with the milk of a kosher animal. Today, many observant Jews rely on the ruling of Rabbi Moshe Feinstein, who argues that in countries such as the United States, where there is strict regulation against mixing milks, non-chalav Yisrael milk is considered kosher.

== Background ==
According to Jewish law (halakha), milk is only considered kosher if it derives from a kosher species of animal—this primarily covers cows, goats, and sheep. Milk from a non-kosher species, such as horses and camels, is inherently non-kosher.

== Institution of chalav Yisrael requirement ==
By the time of the Mishnah, the rabbis of the time (the Tannaim) instituted an injunction against any milk whose milking was not done by, or under the supervision of, a Torah-observant Jew. The prohibition, which is listed in the Mishnah tractate of Avodah Zarah, prohibits drinking such milk, although it allows for benefit to be derived from it, for fear that a non-kosher animal's milk was mixed into the kosher milk. Milk milked by a non-Jew without proper supervision came to be known as "chalav akum", literally "milk of a non-Jew", and milk that was properly milked in accordance with the law is known as "chalav Yisrael, literally "Jewish milk". The traditional Ashkenazi pronunciation of the latter is "cholov Yisroel".

The rule of Chalav Yisrael was codified in Maimonides's Mishneh Torah. and later in the influential code the Shulchan Aruch. Modern chalav Yisrael milk is overseen by a mashgiach, or kosher supervisor, who is required to be present at the beginning of the milking but does not need to be there constantly for the whole time. Mashgichim are also responsible for ensuring that there is no opportunity for the milk to become non–chalav Yisrael at any point before it leaves the facility.

With regard to cheese, according to traditional sources, it is impossible to use milk from non-kosher animals to make cheese. Therefore, as noted by the Star-K kosher certification, there are those who eat non–chalav Yisrael cheese while still only drinking chalav Yisrael milk. This position is also noted in the Mishneh Torah. There is a separate prohibition on cheese manufactured by non-Jews, which has its own parameters (gevinat akum).

== Chalav stam ==
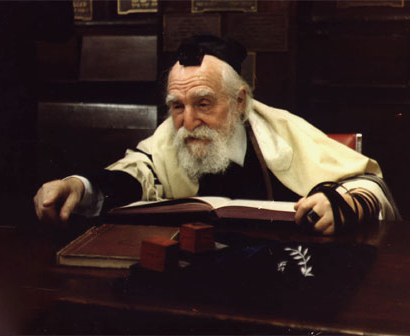
Rav Moshe Feinstein (pictured) famously allowed chalav stam.

The term chalav stam, literally translated as "plain" or "default" milk refers to milk that can be trusted to be kosher even if a Jew did not personally witness its milking with their own eyes. The most well-known licence to drink such milk came from the prominent post-war American posek Rabbi Moshe Feinstein. In his Igros Moshe, Rabbi Feinstein permitted chalav stam in areas where local laws prohibit the mixing of kosher and non-kosher milks. In this case, the government supervision of food regulations is tantamount to the required Jewish supervision and provides sufficient assurance that there has been no cross-contamination of milks. This ruling specifically referred to the United States, but was also accepted in European Union countries, among others, by the Orthodox Union. However it does not apply to countries where such regulations are laxly enforced.

Despite this ruling, many Jews, including Rabbi Feinstein himself, prefer to only use chalav Yisrael milk in the stricter sense—milk actually supervised by a Jew. This includes the Chabad movement, which argues that, particularly when chalav Yisrael is readily available, there are negative spiritual ramifications of consuming non–chalav Yisrael milk. This has led to the usage of the term chalav Yisrael to refer to milk supervised by Jews which does not rely on Rabbi Feinstein's leniency. The term chalav stam is used to describe milk reliant on the leniency. In recent years, it has become more and more common for Orthodox Jews to prefer chalav Yisrael.

For those who require chalav Yisrael, there is a disagreement over whether or not food cooked on equipment that is clean but previously used non–chalav Yisrael product can be eaten.
