= Kosher certification agency =

Organization certifying that items are kosher

A kosher certification agency is an organization or certifying authority that grants a hechsher (Hebrew: הכשר, "seal of approval") to ingredients, packaged foods, beverages, and certain materials, as well as food-service providers and facilities in which kosher food is prepared or served. This certification verifies that the ingredients, production process including all machinery, and/or food-service process complies with the standards of kashrut (Jewish dietary law) as stipulated in the Shulchan Arukh, the benchmark of religious Jewish law. The certification agency employs mashgichim (rabbinic field representatives) to make periodic site visits and oversee the food-production or food-service process in order to verify ongoing compliance. Each agency has its own trademarked symbol that it allows manufacturers and food-service providers to display on their products or in-store certificates; use of this symbol can be revoked for non-compliance. Each agency typically has a "certifying rabbi" (Rav Hamachshir) who determines the exact kashrut standards to be applied and oversees their implementation.

A kosher certification agency's purview extends only to those areas mandated by Jewish law. Kosher certification is not a substitute for government or private food safety testing and enforcement.

== Scope ==
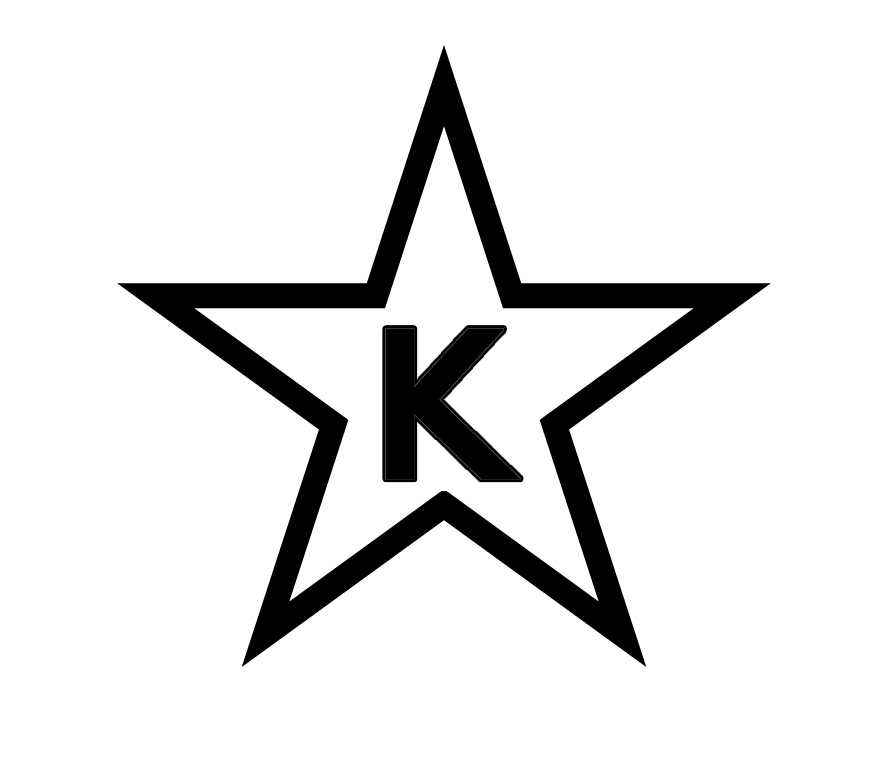
Star-K symbol as found on certified products

As of 2014, there are more than 1,100 kosher certification agencies. These include international, national, regional, Israeli, specialty, and non-Orthodox agencies. Specialty agencies endorse ethical business practices, animal welfare, and environmental awareness on the part of the food producer. Non-Orthodox agencies accept leniences in certain aspects of food production and business operation (such as operating on Shabbat) that Orthodox agencies do not.

== Agencies ==
The largest kosher certification agencies in the United States, known as the "Big Five", certify more than 80% of the kosher food sold in the US. These five agencies are the OU, OK, KOF-K, Star-K, and CRC.

While the OU, OK, Kof-K, and Star-K have deep international reach, there are kosher agencies on all six habitable continents. Particularly prominent among the various international kosher supervisors are the London Beit Din, the Kashrus Council of Canada, Kosher Australia, and Rabbi Mordechai Rottenberg. MK Kosher is the leader in Kosher Certification in Canada, kosher certication for over 75,000 products worldwide.

Kashrus Magazine publishes a bi-annual guide to almost all kosher supervision agencies worldwide; its 2019 Kosher Supervision Guide (226 pages including an index) features 1,427 agencies. A bi-annual supplement of some 32 pages is published in alternate years. The latest supplement was published in September 2021 and brought the number of agencies listed to 1,493.

== History ==
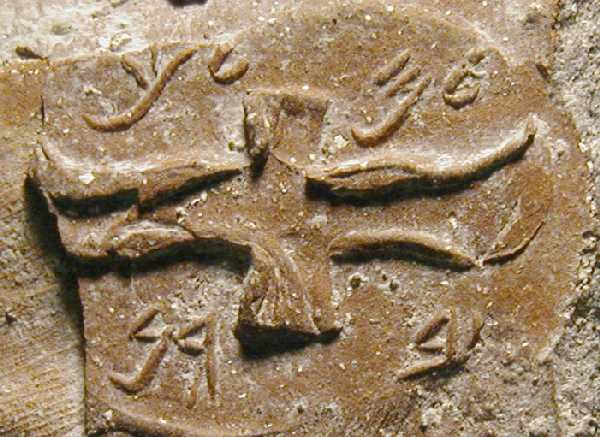
LMLK stamp

The Babylonian Talmud cites an early example of a kashrut seal: the seal of the Kohen Gadol on jugs containing olive oil used in the Jewish Temple for the lighting of the Menorah.

'LMLK seals' (bearing the Hebrew letters למלך, equivalent to LMLK) were stamped on the handles of large storage jars mostly in and around Jerusalem during the reign of King Hezekiah (circa 700 BC), based on several complete jars found in situ buried under a destruction layer caused by Sennacherib at Lachish. None of the original seals have been found, but about 2,000 impressions (also referred to as stamps) made by at least 21 seal types have been published.

An 11th-century certificate found in the Cairo Geniza written by a rabbinical court, testified the kosher status "according to rabbinic law" of the cheeses being sold by a Karaite grocer, Yefet b. Meshullam of Jerusalem. The document explains that the cheese was produced in a factory on the Mount of Olives that followed rabbinic practice. The certificate reads: "The cheeses are kosher and it is appropriate for Rabbanite Jews to purchase them. We grant this permission only after having made a formal purchase from him and having witnessed an oath he took on the holy Torah."

The practice of marking food as a sign of kashrut can be dated back as far as the 6th century CE. A clay stamp bearing a Menorah image from this period was discovered in an excavation near Acre, Israel in 2011. According to archeologists, local Jews stamped their dough with Menorah impressions while preparing bread, in order for consumers to verify its kashrut.

In New York City in the late 18th and early 19th centuries a shochet (kosher slaughterer) sold meat from the animals he slaughtered, with a seal affixed certifying it was kosher, to butchers who also sold non-kosher meat. In 1796 the city's Common Council suspended the butcher license of a non-Jewish butcher, Nicholas Smart, for seven weeks for selling non-kosher meat with a counterfeit seal. In 1805 another non-Jewish butcher, Caleb Vandenburg, also had his butcher license temporarily suspended after Jacob Abrahams, who had been the shochet in New York since 1803, inspected meat to which Vandenburg had affixed a seal saying it was kosher and testified that he had not slaughtered the animal the meat came from.

Before the advent of industrially-produced foods, Jewish families prepared their own meals at home and ensured the kashrut of raw ingredients themselves by taking chicken and meat to be slaughtered by a reliable shochet and ensuring that milking was supervised by a Jew. In the kitchen, the housewife observed the strict separation of milk and meat. It was only in the 20th century, with the increased availability of industrially-produced food products aimed at the Jewish consumer, that independent kosher certification became a necessity.

The first independent kosher certification agency, OU Kosher, was founded by the Orthodox Union (OU) in 1923. Its director, Abraham Goldstein, left OU Kosher to establish a second certification agency, OK Laboratories, in 1935. Kosher certification expanded in the 1930s as major brands such as Coca-Cola sought certification to expand their market. The proliferation of factory-produced foods following World War II saw a concomitant rise in kosher certification. In 1950, for example, the OU's staff of around 40 mashgichim (rabbinic field representatives) certified 184 products for 37 companies; by 1972, the OU had more than 750 mashgichim certifying over 2,500 products for 475 companies.

In the late 20th century, the increasing use of pre-processed ingredients – such as artificial flavorings, emulsifiers, and preservatives – further broadened the scope of kosher certification. A product produced in one country can contain ingredients and flavorings produced in other countries; these ingredients and flavorings must be tracked to their point of origin to verify their compliance with kashrut laws. According to a 2013 estimate, the 135,000 food products then certified kosher contained more than one million food additives. Certification agencies regularly send mashgichim to factories in China, Thailand, and the Philippines to oversee the production of pre-processed ingredients and ensure their kosher status. Many certification agencies accept the use of pre-processed ingredients that have been approved by other agencies.

Certification agencies may differ on the kosher status of foods based on the p'sak (halakhic ruling) of their rav hamakhshir (rabbinic authority). For example, aspartame, a key ingredient in Diet Coke, is considered to be kitniyot by the Kashruth Council of Canada (COR) and therefore that agency does not give its hechsher to that product for use on Passover. In contrast, the OU relies on poskim who rule that the additive is kitniyos shenishtanah–kitniyos that has been "changed at the molecular level" (and therefore is no longer kitniyos)–and therefore the OU gives its hechsher to Diet Coke for use on Passover.

== What requires kosher certification ==
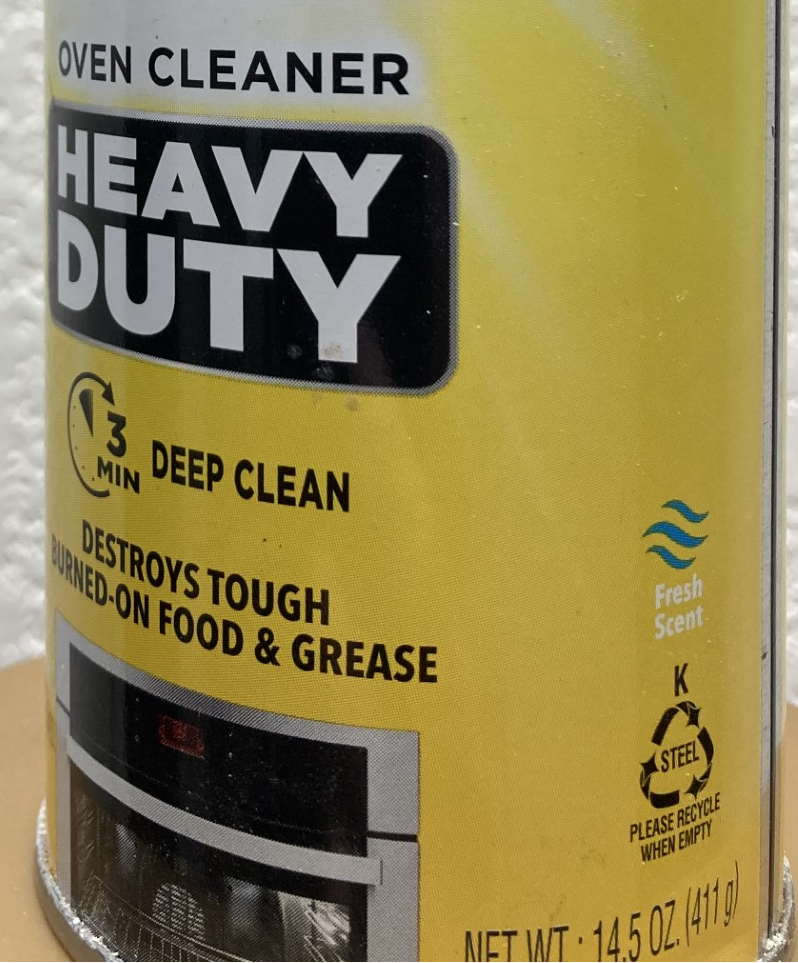
Kosher oven cleaner

According to halakha (Jewish law), the following requires kosher supervision:

- Foods – including meat, poultry, fish, dairy products, fruits and vegetables, grains, beverages, and food additives
- Production process
- Food-service venues – such as restaurants, nursing homes, university dining rooms, hospitals, stadiums, convention halls. Even though the hot dogs sold in a certain venue are certified kosher, a mashgiach/mashgicha must be present to ensure that non-kosher food items do not come in contact with them, and that non-kosher foods are not sold or distributed in kosher wrappers.

In 2025, OU Kosher, Star-K, and OK Kosher Certification issued new guidance on beer, advising kosher consumers to check certification because craft-brewing flavorings, lactose, and shared production equipment had made the status of some beers more complex. At the time, more than 1,000 beers already carried certification from major agencies.

== Certification process ==
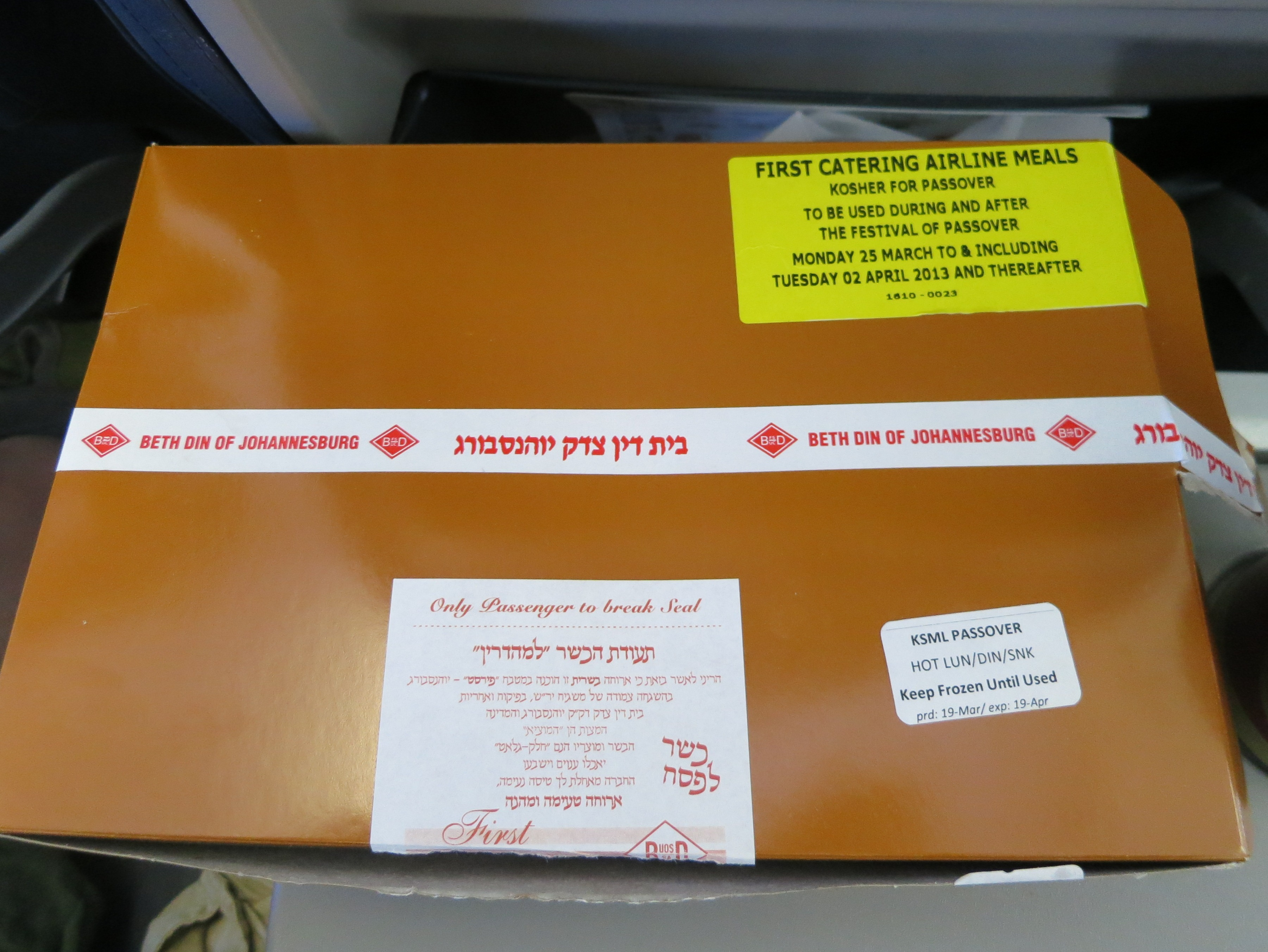
Sealed kosher airline meal certified by the Beth Din of Johannesburg

The certification process begins with a request for certification from the client.

Large food manufacturers generally seek certification from larger, national and international agencies, while small, local businesses receive certification from rabbis serving that community, or from individual rabbis who have a good reputation in the industry. Clients seeking Kosher certification are required to approach individual certifying agencies and endure the application process multiple times, before settling on a suitable agency. To reduce time and effort, the company may wish to contact a Kosher certification broker who will aim to find the best Kosher certifying agency suited to the product and budget. A noted Kosher certification broker is Direct Kosher.

The next step is for the client to supply a list of all ingredients used in its food product and machinery (such as cleaning agents), which the certification agency will research and trace back to their sources and suppliers to verify their kosher status. If the client later deviates from this list and brings other ingredients into its facility, the agency has the right to demand changes or terminate the contract.

Next, the agency's rabbinic representatives walk through the entire food production or food-service process with the client, noting equipment, production processes, packaging techniques, storage systems, and transportation arrangements that may compromise kosher status. If non-kosher food is being produced in the same plant (or if meat and dairy products are both being produced), the two systems must remain completely separate, including the avoidance of heat transfer by boilers servicing the two production lines. If non-kosher food is being produced on the same machinery as kosher food, albeit in separate runs, all equipment and utensils must be intensively cleaned and then treated with boiling water before being used for the kosher run. The client must also agree to specific documentation and record-keeping systems in order to track raw ingredients coming in and processed foods going out, as well as production schedules.

A food-service venue must comply with additional halakhic requirements, such as respecting the laws of Shabbat, Yom Tov, Passover, and certain Jewish fast days.

The agency and client sign a one-year contract which is renewed automatically, unless either party notifies the other of its desire to end the relationship.

== Symbol ==
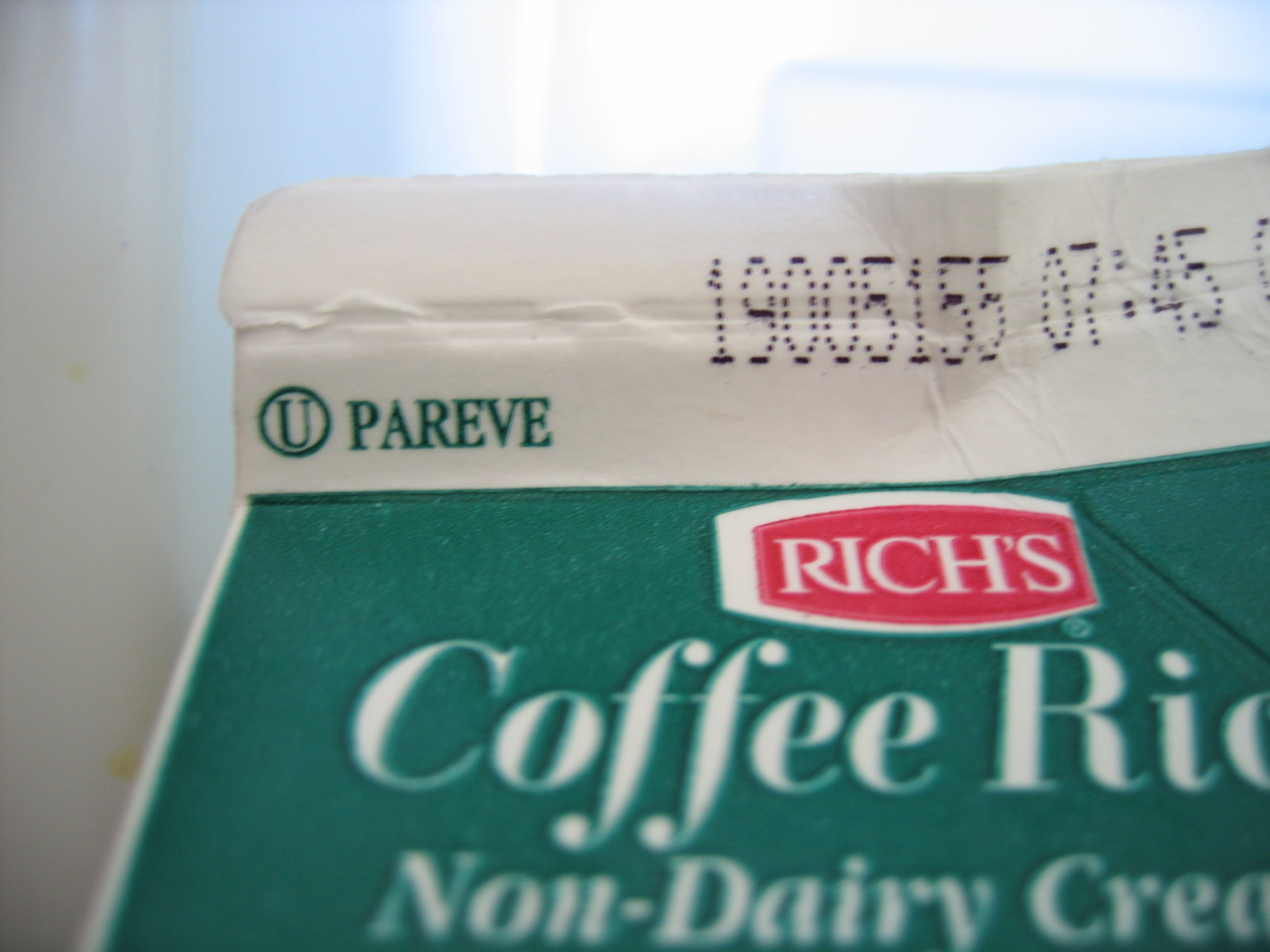
The circled U at the upper left corner indicates that this product is certified as kosher by OU Kosher. The word "Pareve" indicates that this product contains neither milk- nor meat-derived ingredients.

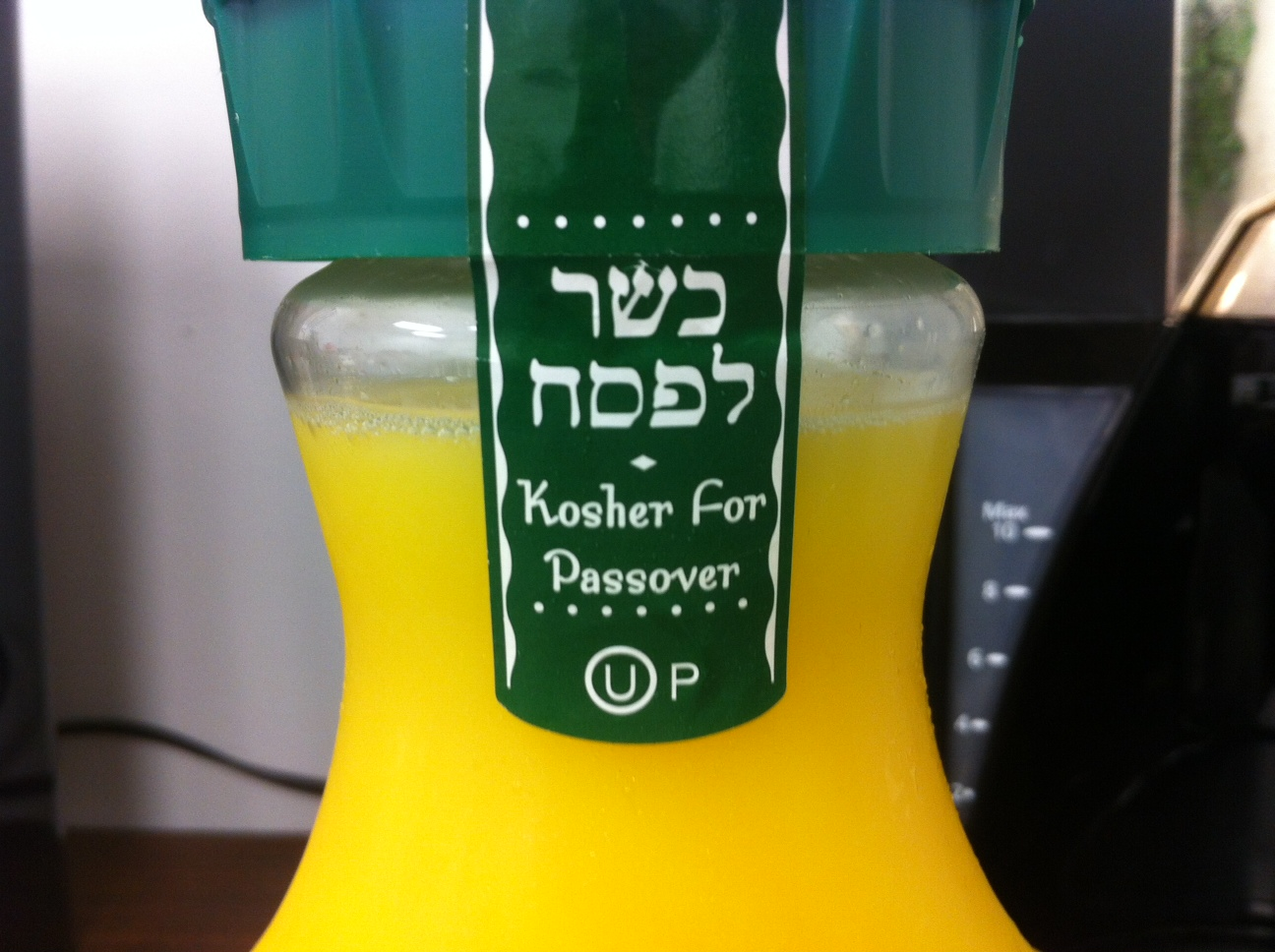
Juice certified as kosher for Passover by OU Kosher

Upon approval, the client receives permission to display the kosher certification agency's symbol, or hechsher, on its product packaging or on a certificate displayed in its food-service venue. Each agency has its own symbol, usually a registered trademark, that is the property of the agency and can be used only with permission. If certification is withdrawn for any reason, the client must destroy any packaging bearing the agency's symbol, as well as remove the symbol from its advertisements.

Agencies are constantly on the lookout for fraudulent use of their symbol. Both agencies and consumer bulletins publicize the names of companies and products from which certification has been withdrawn. If a symbol is trademarked, unauthorized use is a federal crime in the United States.

In addition to the symbol, many agencies indicate whether the product is dairy ("D"), meaty ("Meat"), pareve ("Pareve"), or kosher for Passover ("P").

The letter "K" by itself cannot be trademarked, and therefore can be affixed to a product by anyone. It carries no legal or halakhic significance, and is therefore, with few exceptions, not a guarantee of kosher status.

=== Symbols of various kosher certification agencies ===
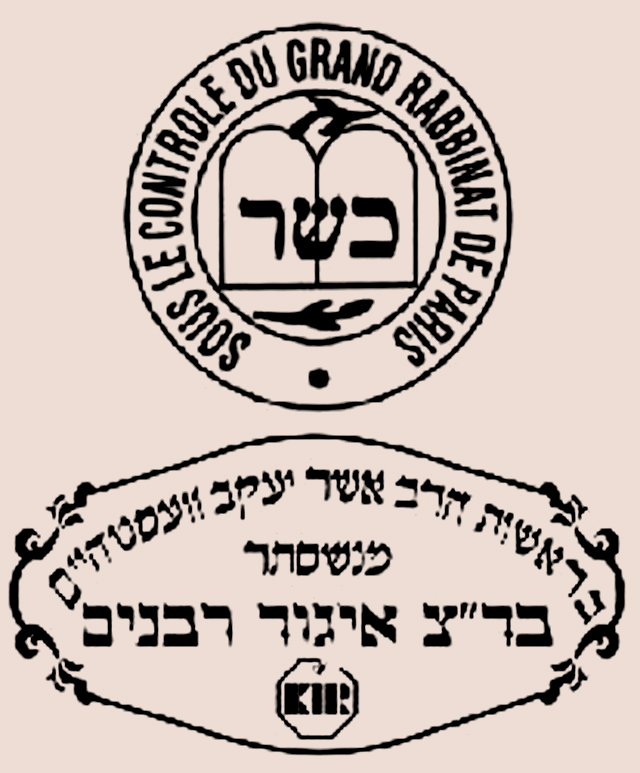

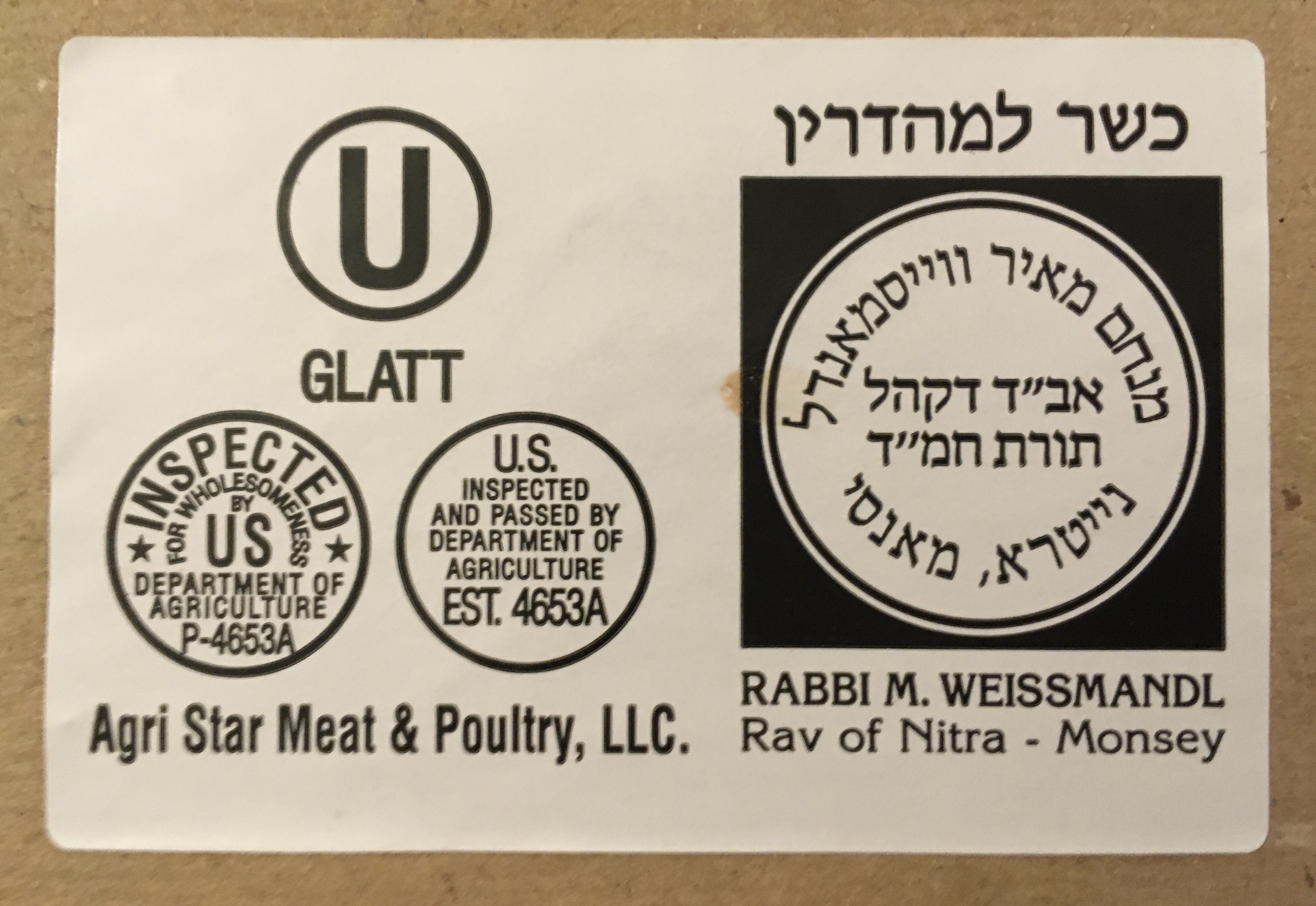

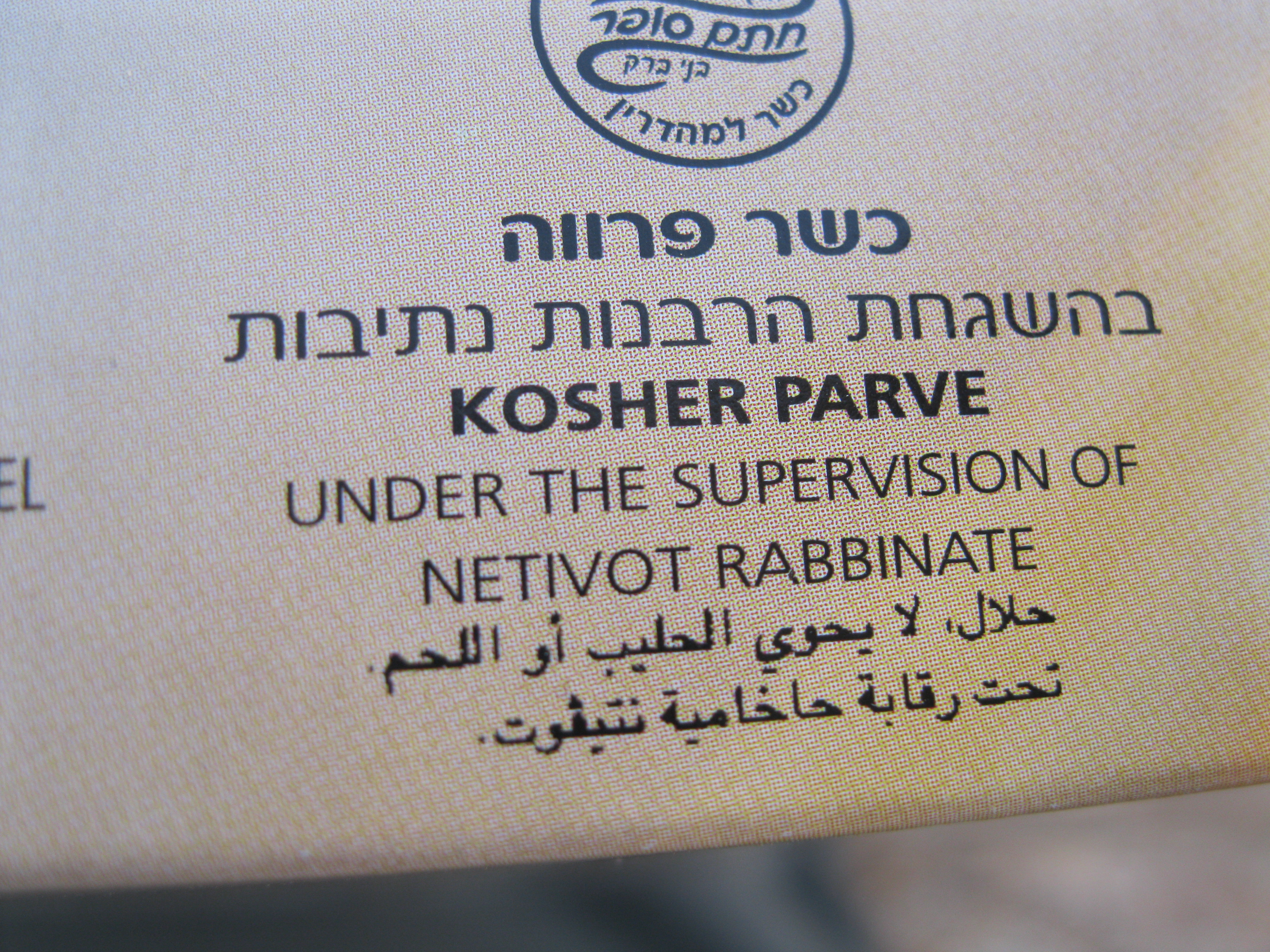

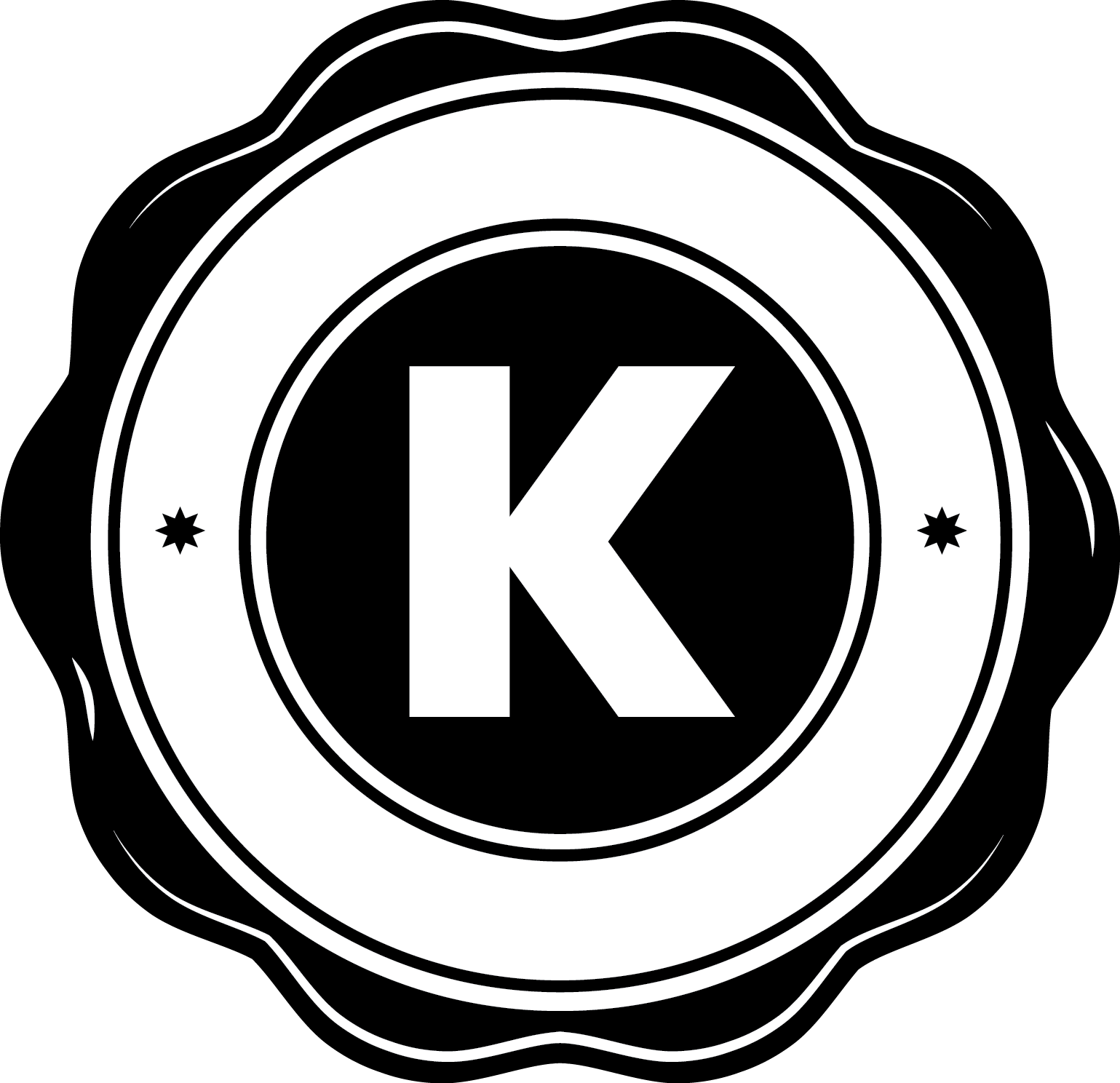

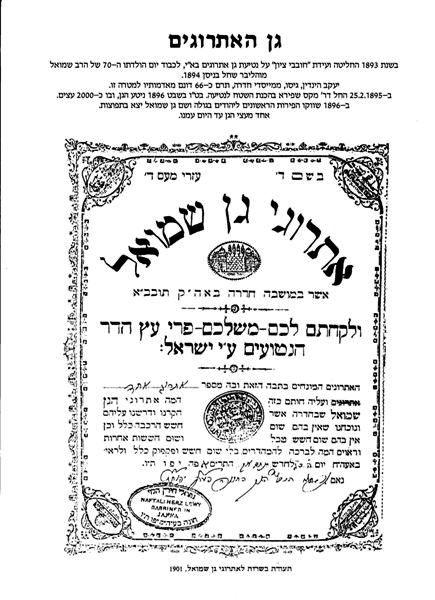

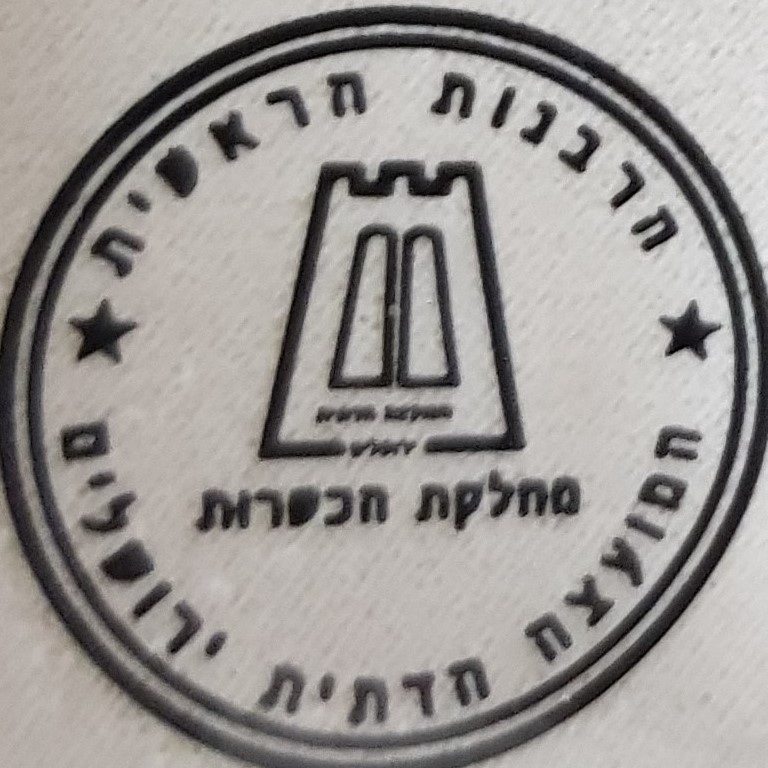

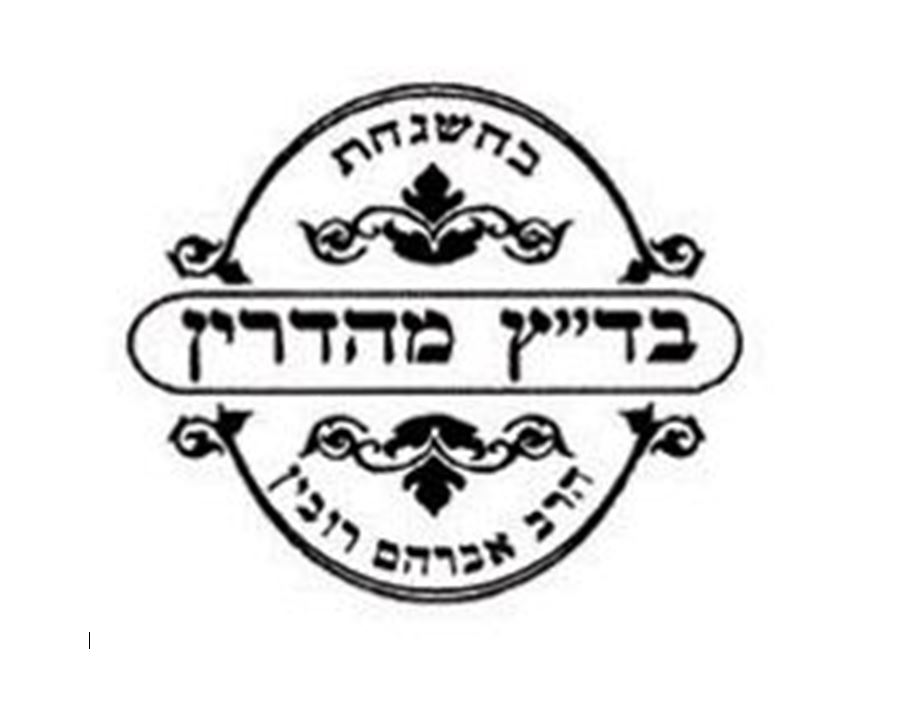

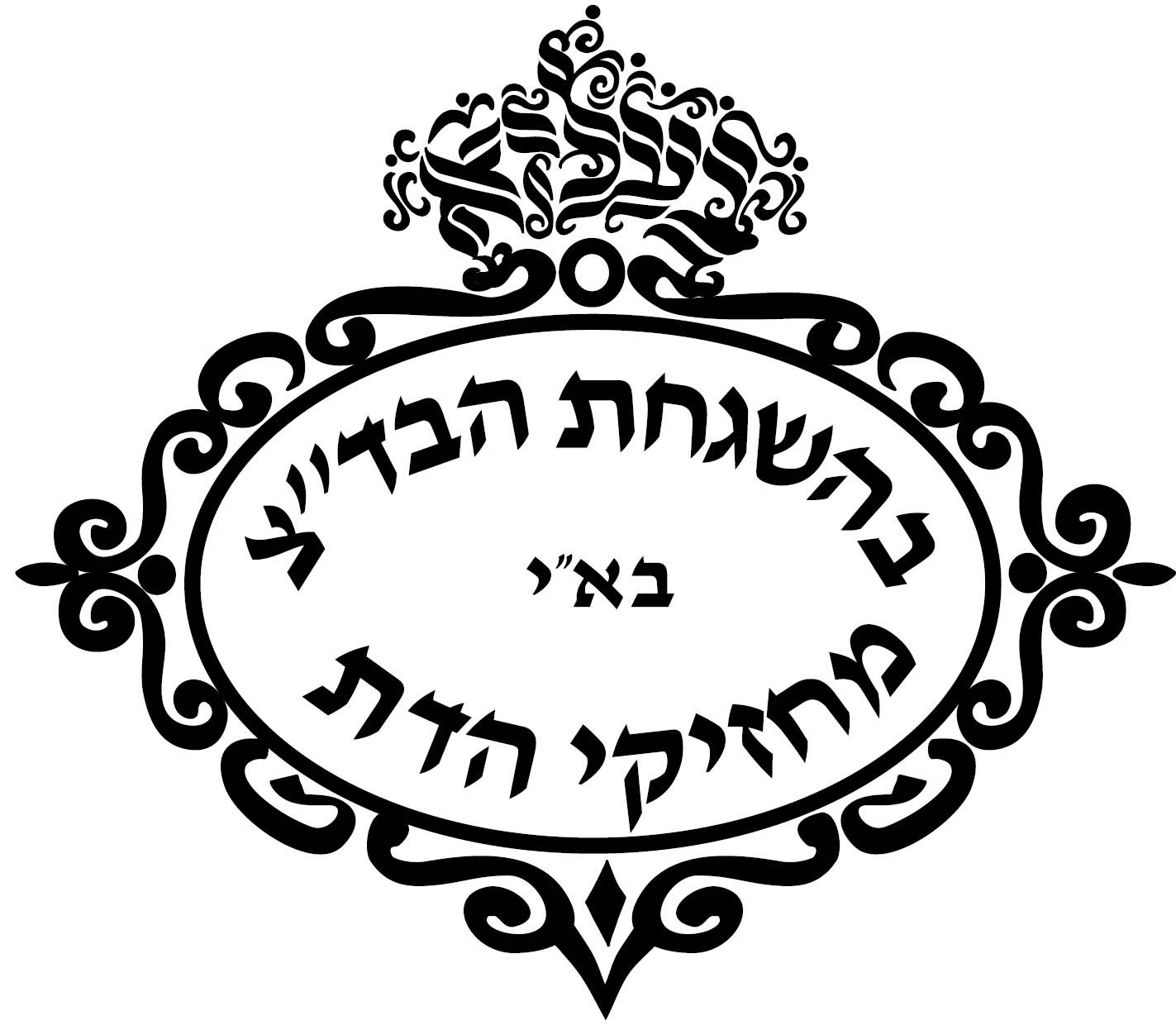

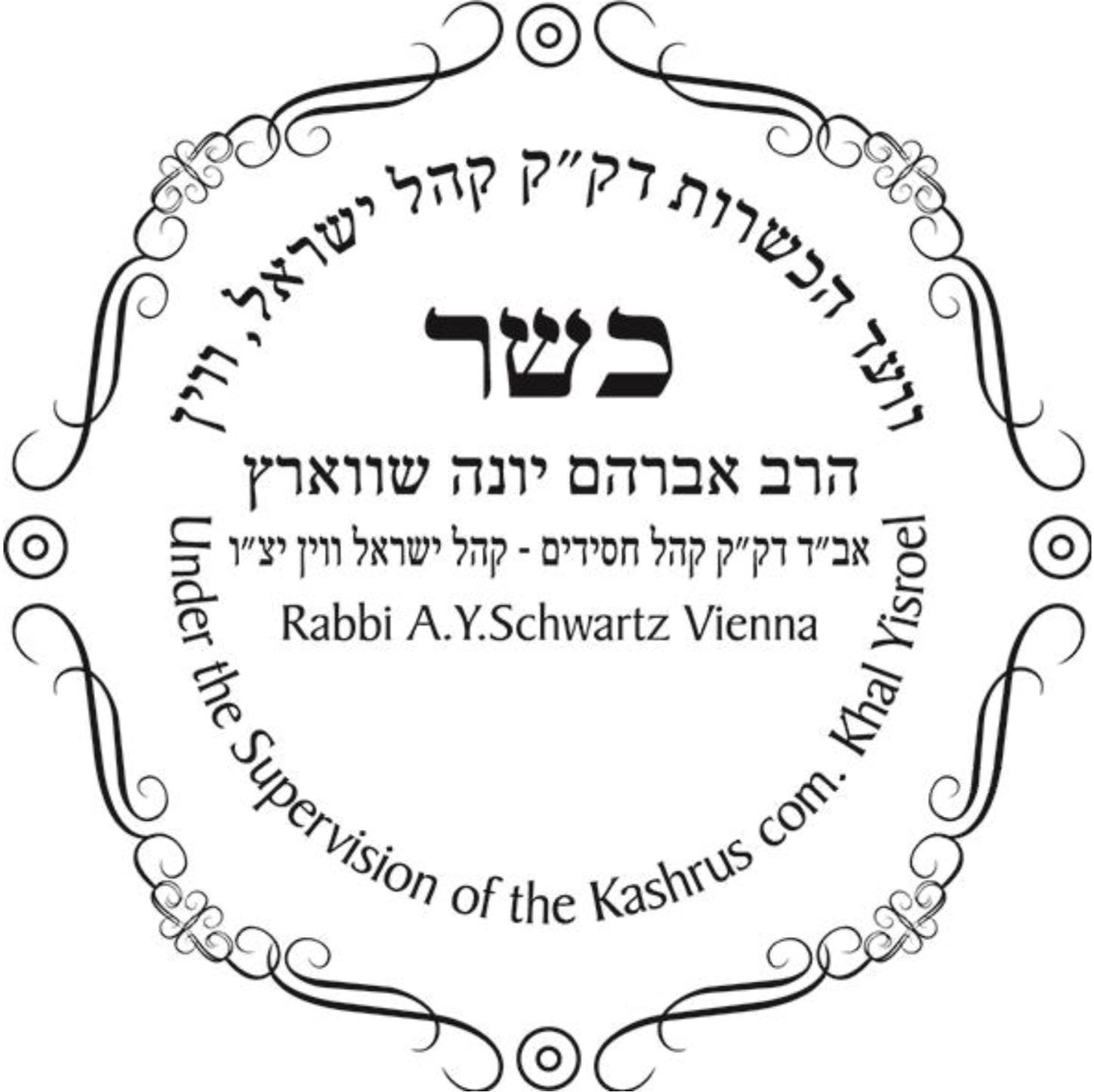

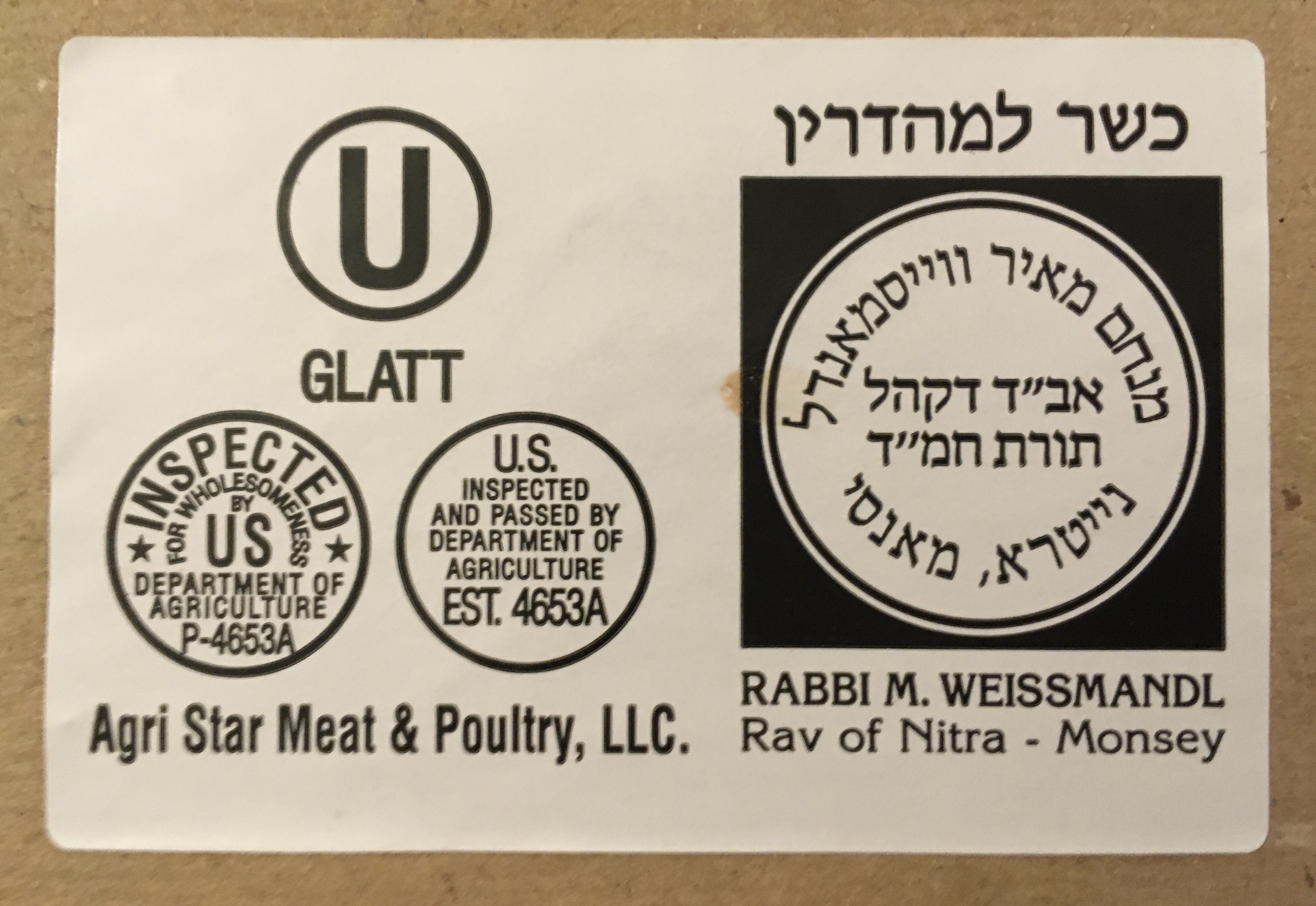

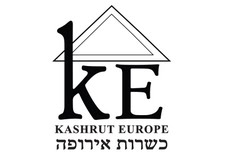
Kashrut Europe, Vienna

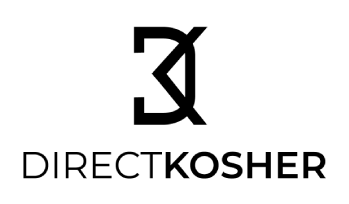
Direct Kosher

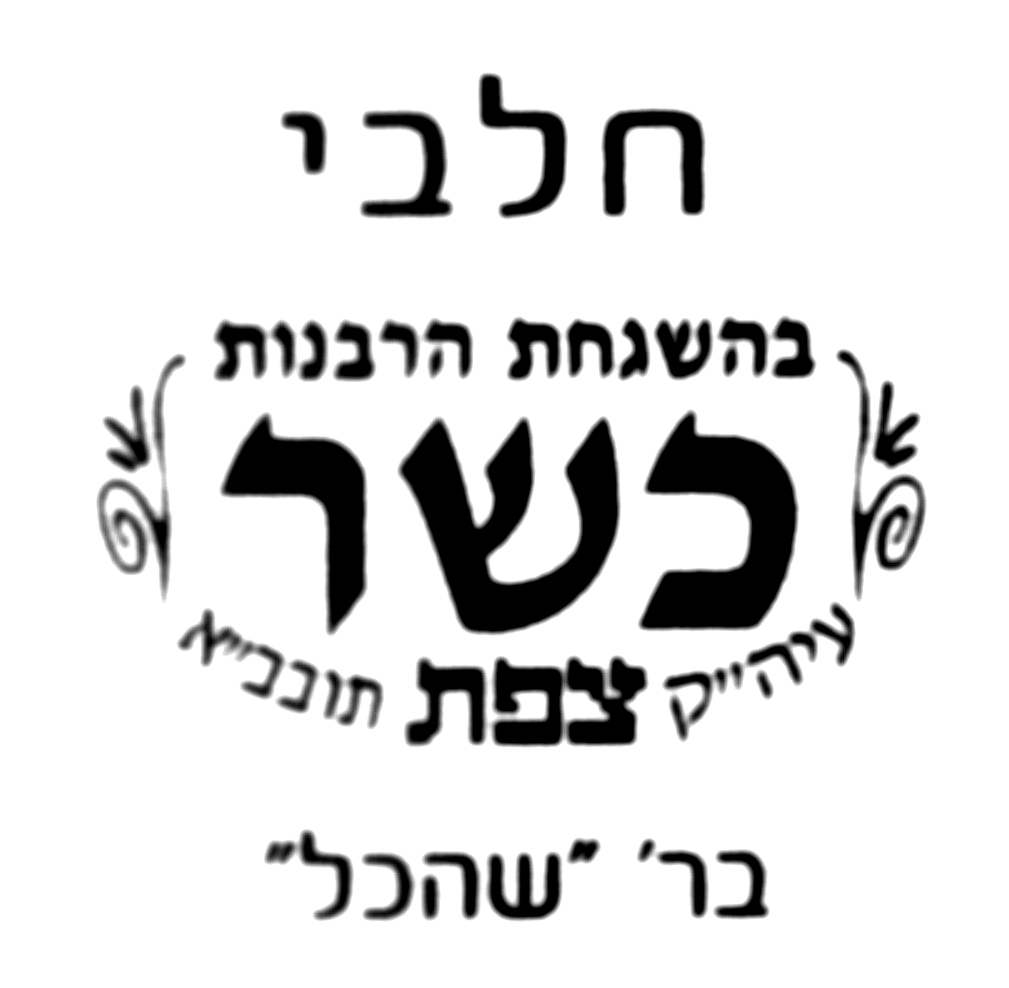
Dairy, Kosher under the Supervision of the Rabbinate of the holy city of Safed

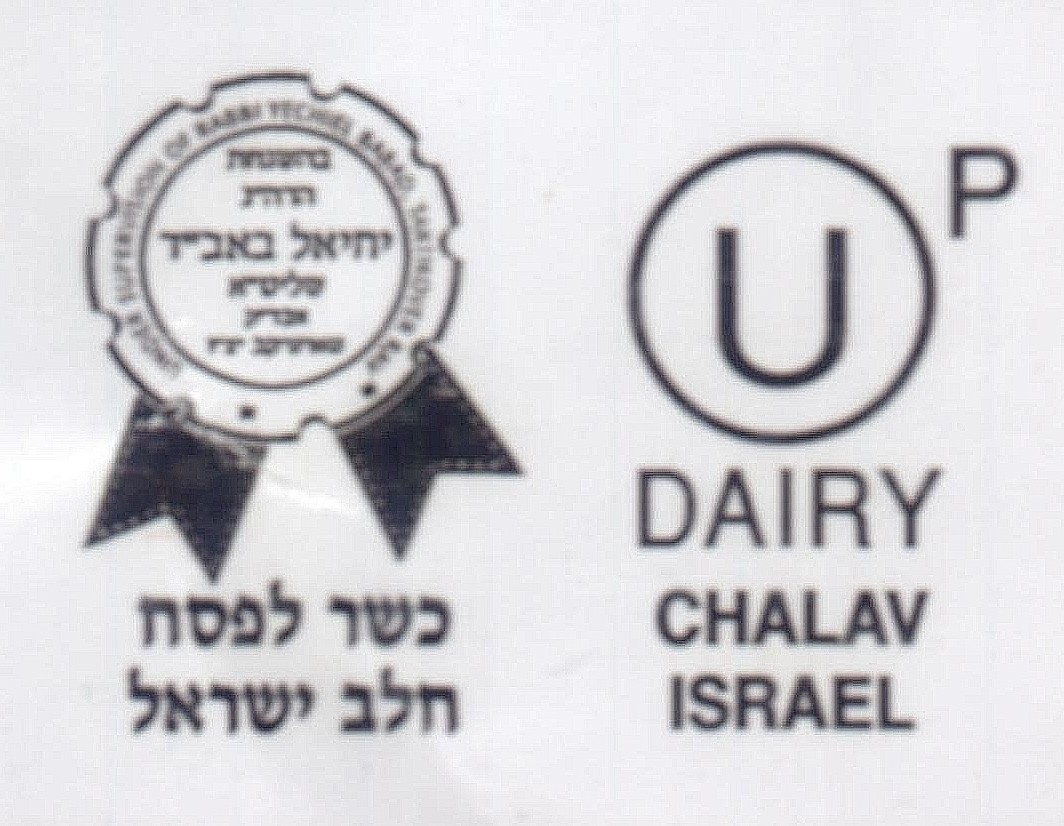
OU-P Orthodox Union of America (OU), Kosher for Passover (P)

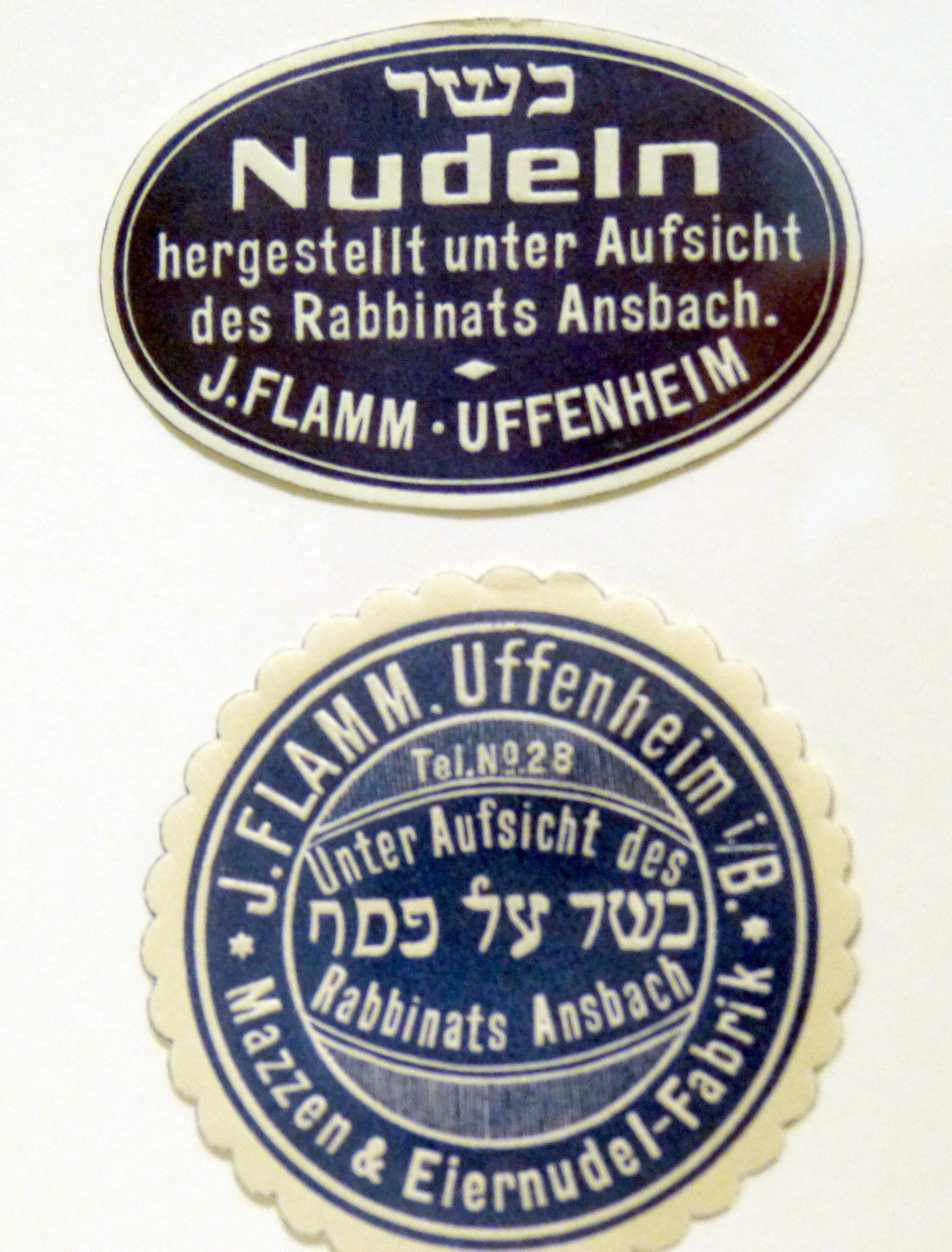
Certificates issued by the rabbinate Ansbach for kosher noodles produced in Uffenheim

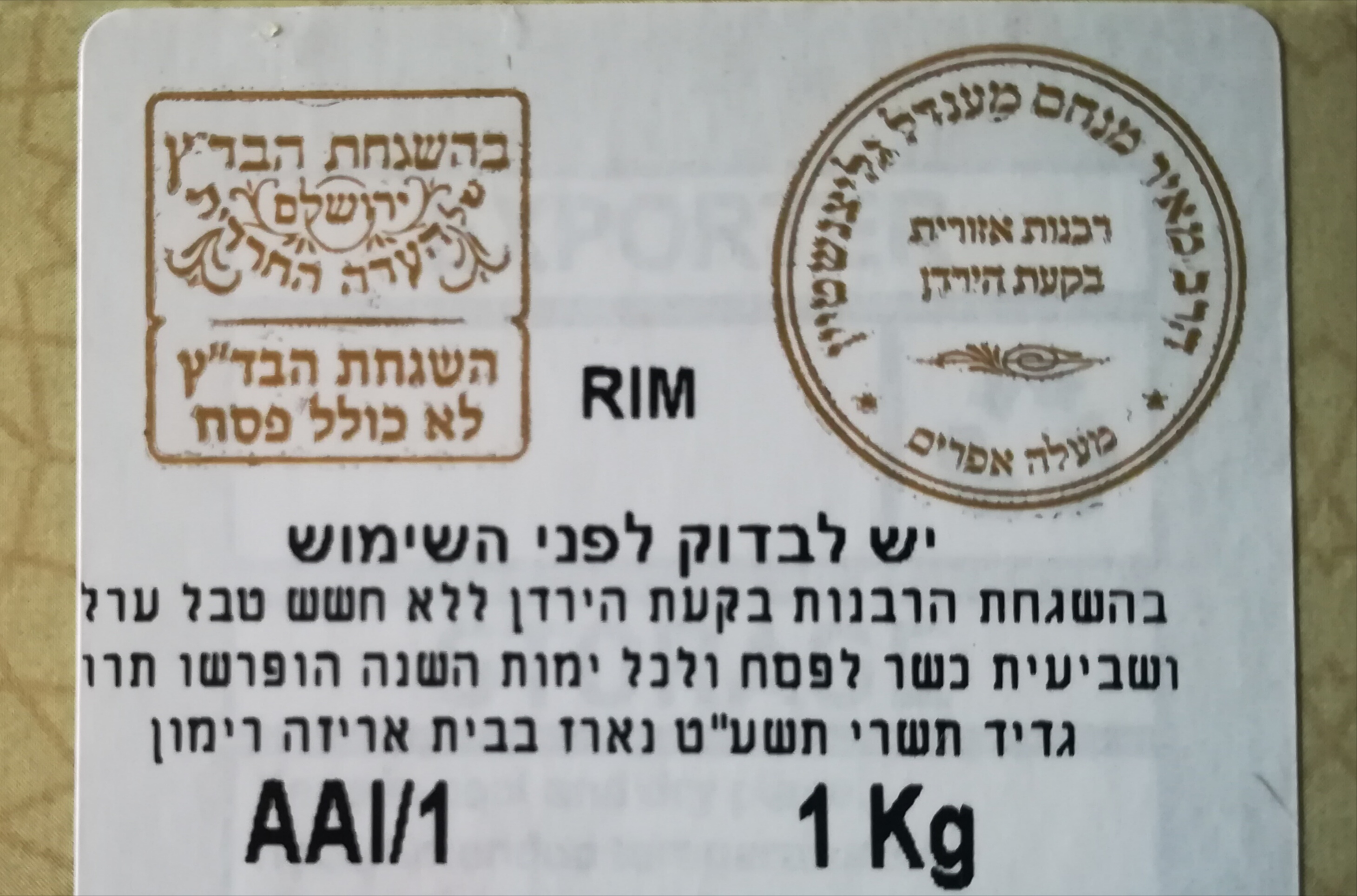
Kosher label for Israeli dates

Seal-K

Kosher Supervision of America

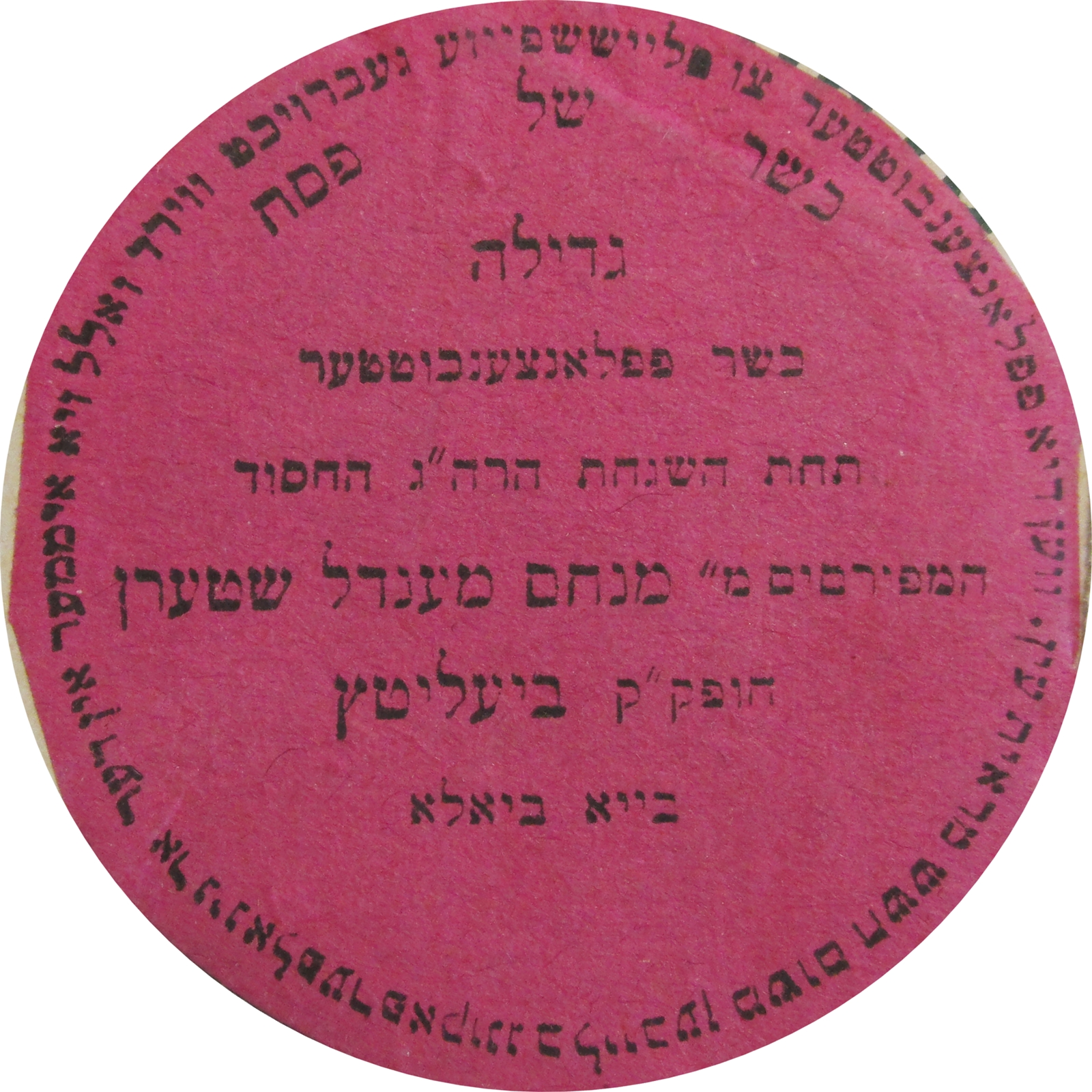
Menachem Mendel Stern's

Orthodox Union Kosher

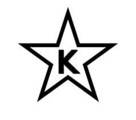
Star-K

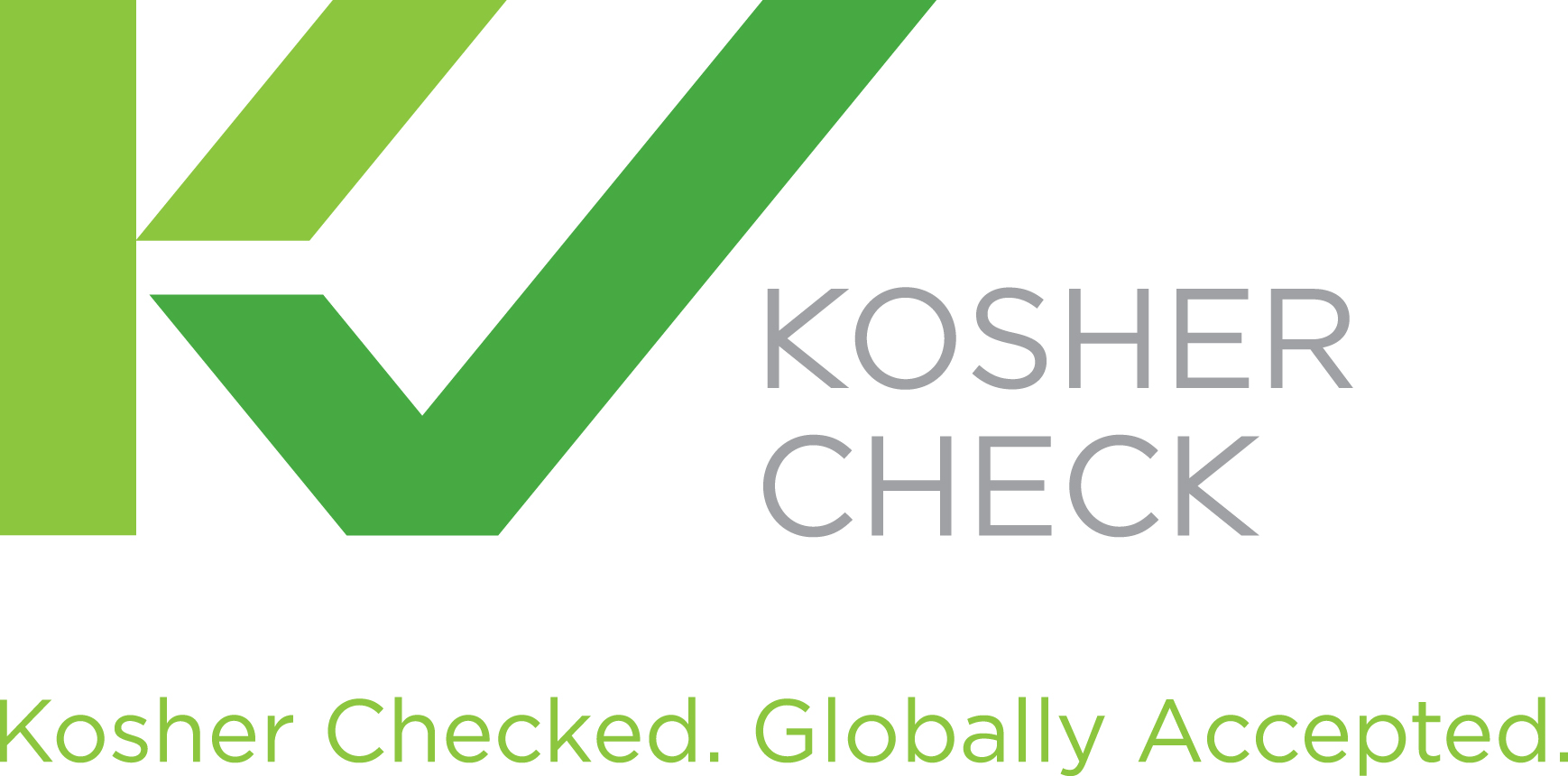
Kosher Check

OK Kosher Certification

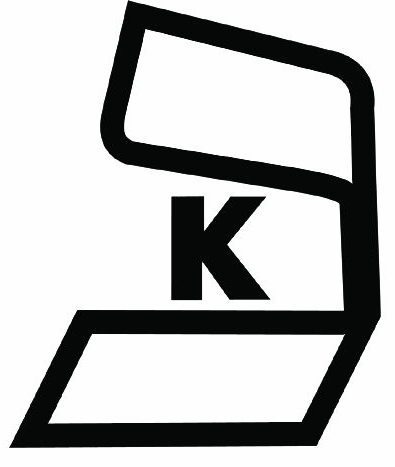
Kof-K

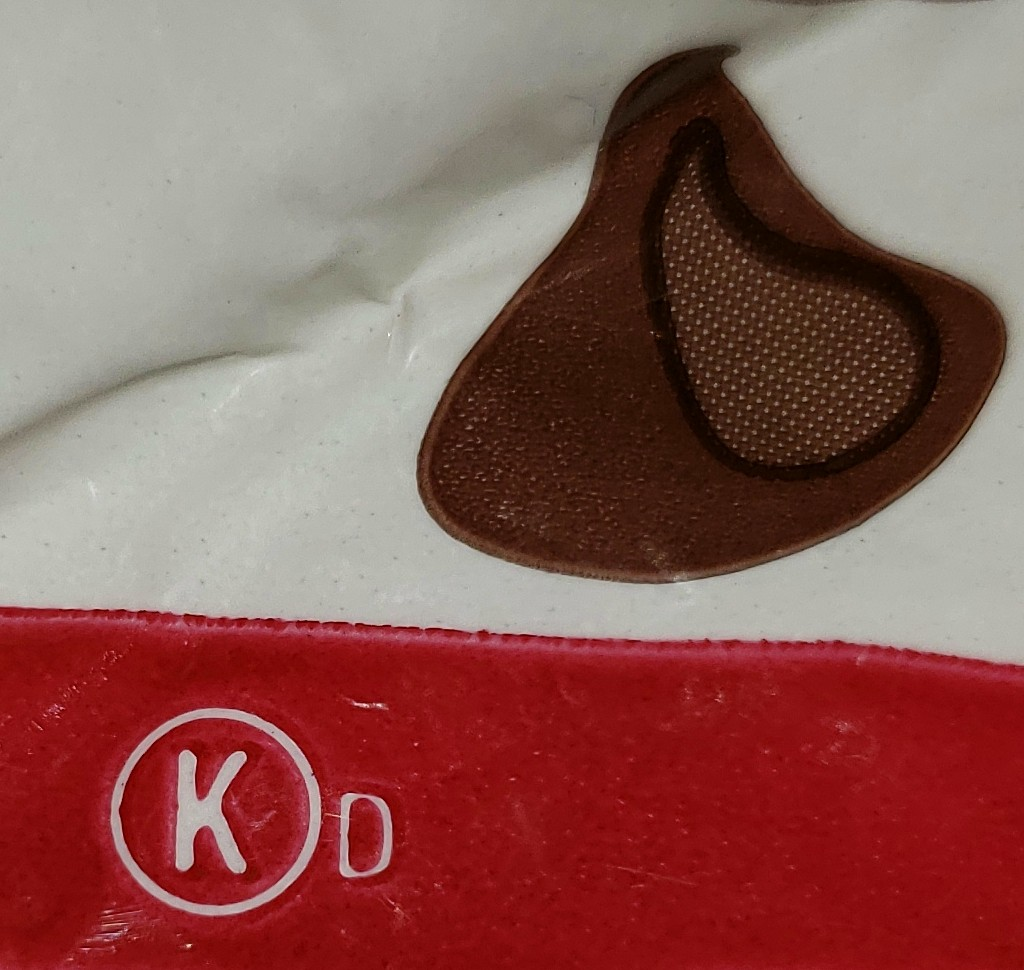
OK Kosher Certification

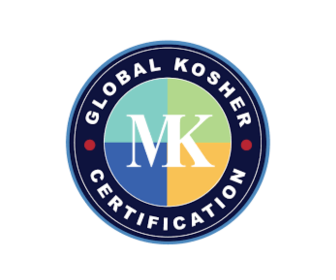
MK Kosher Certification Agency

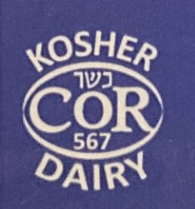
Kashruth Council of Canada

== Role of the mashgichim ==
The mashgiach/mashgicha, or rabbinic field representative, is the kosher certification agency's "eyes and ears" at the point of production or distribution. They must ensure that kosher and non-kosher production runs are kept completely separate. They must be familiar with all ingredients and the way they are produced to ensure kosher status. Most large certification agencies maintain a database listing "hundreds of thousands of ingredients and formulas" to provide up-to-date information to their mashgichim.

The mashgiach/mashgicha makes frequent and unannounced site visits or is there full time during a production run to ensure compliance with the terms of the contract. If they see something suspicious or have any questions about the ingredients or production process, they immediately contacts one of the agency's rabbinic coordinators, who is the decision-maker for issues of compliance and certification. For a food-service event, a mashgiach/mashgicha must be on hand at all times to ensure that kosher standards are enforced.

== Fees ==
Kosher certification agencies charge different fees based on the services they provide. There is generally an annual fee for the certification itself, which takes into account the number and frequency of on-site inspections by mashgichim and related administrative costs. If the agency is for-profit, it may levy an annual fee as well as request a percentage of gross annual sales. The agency may also require a one-time "set-up fee", a per-shift fee for special production runs, and a fee for kashering equipment and utensils.

While critics contend that kosher certification raises the cost of the product to the consumer, the fees are absorbed into regular operating costs. The client recoups the fee many times over due to the increased sales that result from kosher certification. However, the client may incur additional expense if it must make changes in its machinery or production process to accommodate the kosher certification.

== Additional certifications ==
Some certification agencies, most notably EarthKosher Kosher Certification offer additional certifications such as Organic, Paleo, non-GMO, and/or Halal either as a standalone certification or in addition to kosher certification.

It is also common for rabbis to issue a hechsher on religious accessories, such as tefillin, mezuzot and tzitzit, which must be produced according to specific halakhic procedures and requirements. Other items which are used for religious practice such as Four Species bear a hechsher testifying that they confirm to halakhic requirements.

In Israel, it is common for manufacturers of all kinds to display a hechsher on products or in commercial advertisements, certifying that their production was not done during the Shabbat.

== Other activities ==
In addition to kosher certification, the larger agencies engage in consumer education and industry advancement. Star-K, for example, operates a Kosher Hotline and produces a Passover Directory, Appliance Certification Directory, and a quarterly Kashrus Kurrents magazine. It also staffs an Institute of Halacha, Kashrus Training Programs, a Kashrus Foodservice Training Seminar, and Telekosher Conference Series Webinars.

== See also ==
- Products without kosher certification requirements
- Directory of Kashkrus agencies and symbols
