= Mashgiach =

Dietary law supervisor of a kosher establishment

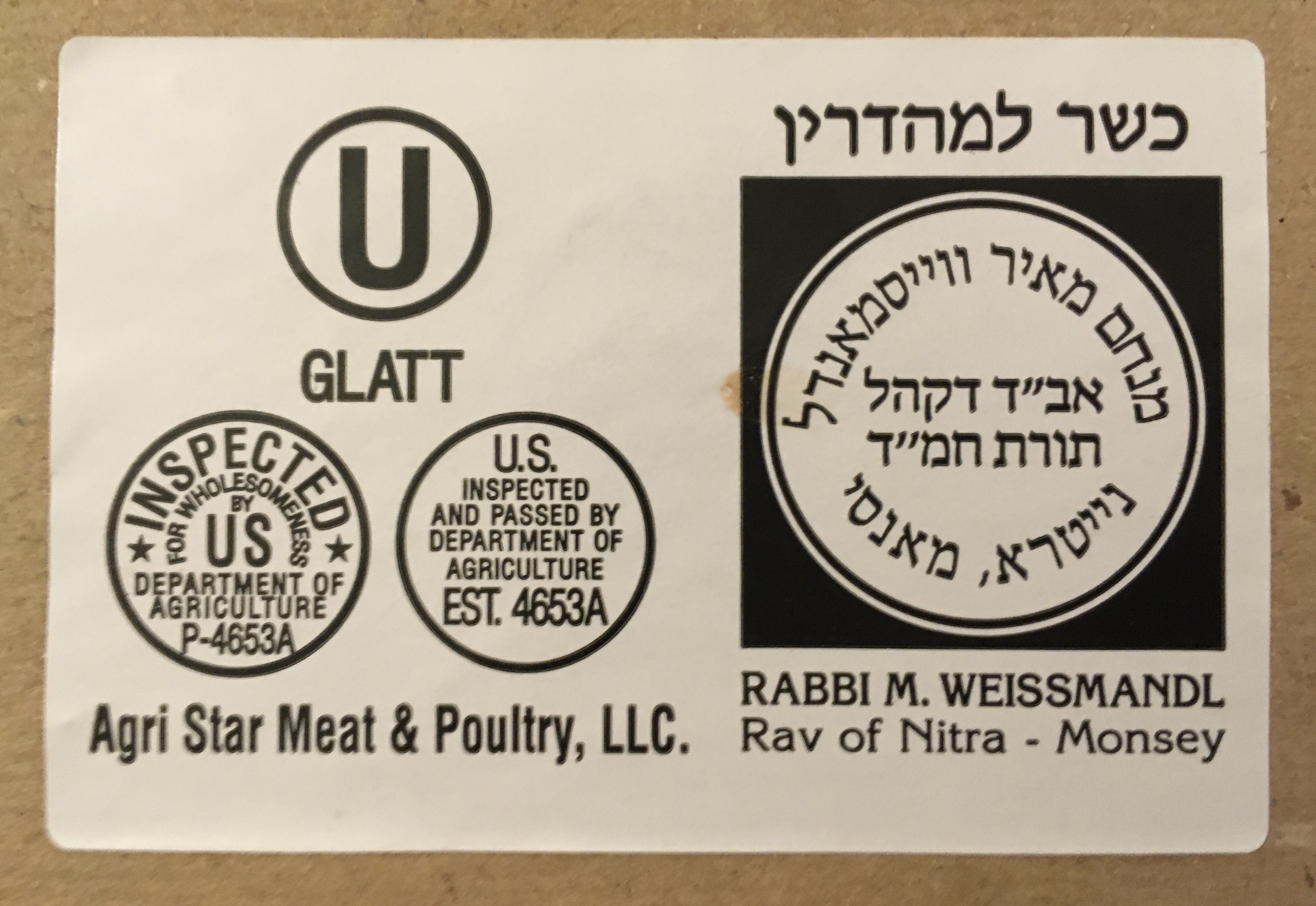
Various Kosher symbols on a package of Kosher meat

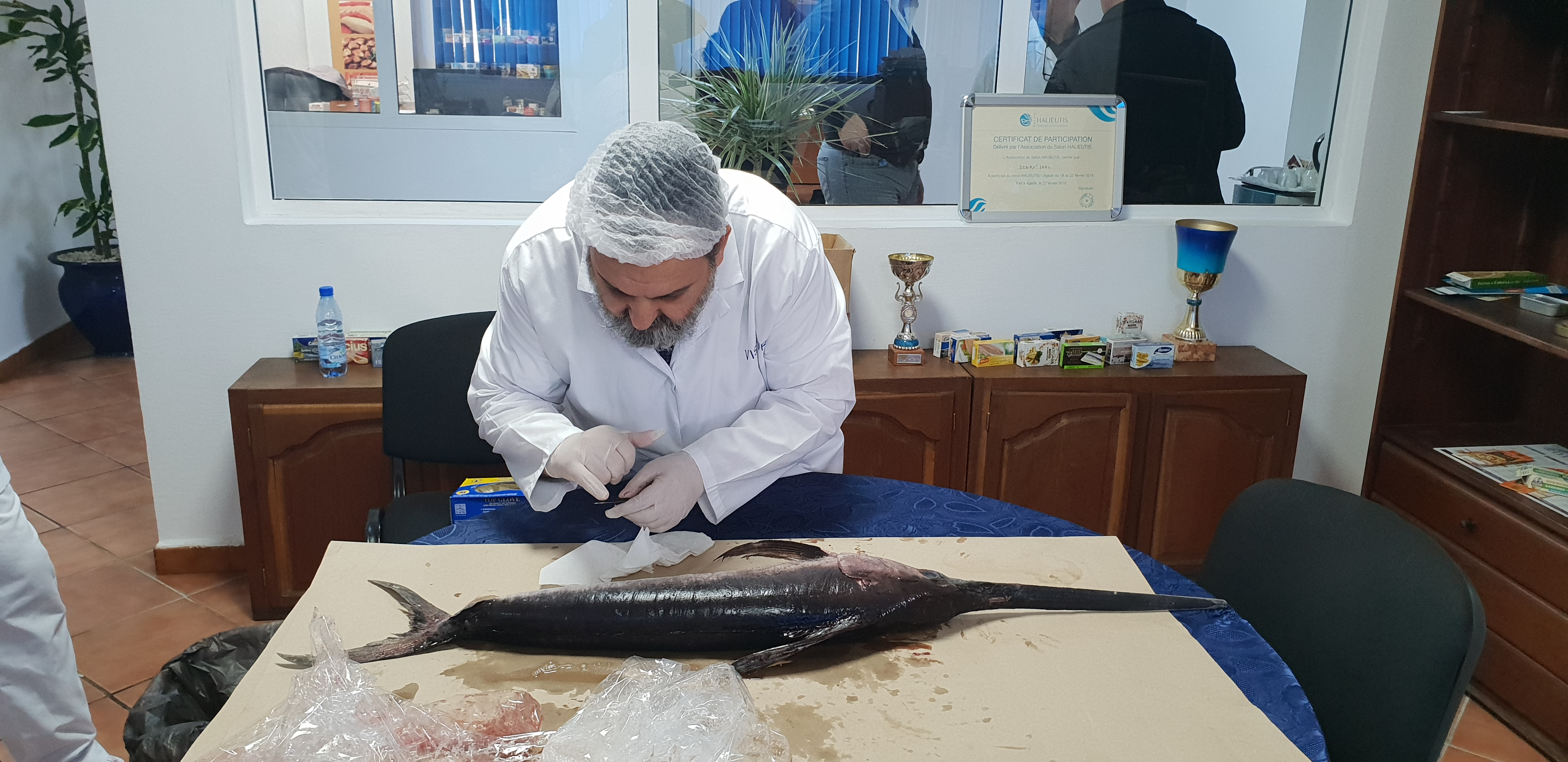
A rabbi searching for scales on the skin of a swordfish in Tétouan, Morocco

A mashgiach (Hebrew: משגיח, lit. "supervisor"; pl. משגיחים, mashgichim) or mashgicha (pl. mashgichot) is a Jew who supervises the kashrut status of a kosher establishment. Mashgichim may supervise any type of food service establishment, including slaughterhouses, food manufacturers, hotels, caterers, nursing homes, restaurants, butchers, groceries, or cooperatives. Mashgichim usually work as on-site supervisors and inspectors, representing a kosher certification agency or a local rabbi, who actually makes the policy decisions for what is or is not acceptably kosher. Sometimes certifying rabbis (רב המכשיר, Rav Hamachshir; pl., Rav Hamachshirim) act as their own mashgichim; such is the case in many small communities.

== Requirements ==
The requirements for becoming a mashgiach/mashgicha are being Jewish, being Sabbath-observant (shomer Shabbat), being Torah-observant (shomer mitzvot), and personally fulfilling the laws of kashrut (shomer kashrut). According to Rabbi Matisyahu Salomon, a senior Orthodox rabbi in the United States, the most important criterion is Yirat Shamayim (fear of Heaven).

Many AKO (Association of Kashrus Organizations) member organizations worldwide require mashgichim to complete the AKO Mashgiach Course, created by the Kosher Institute of America, and obtain a Mashgiach ID Card as a prerequisite to working as a mashgiach or mashgicha.

Most mashgichim are Orthodox. However, there are also Conservative and Reform mashgichim. In 2003, the Kosher Law Enforcement Division of the New York Department of Agriculture and Markets issued fines to two Long Island butchers, Jeff and Brian Yarmeisch, because they had employed a Conservative mashgiach. The United States Supreme Court upheld a ruling by lower courts that New York's 88 year old law regulating kashrut was unconstitutional because it favored an Orthodox interpretation of Jewish religious law. When New York state legislators and New York Governor George Pataki convened to consider new legislation, Conservative leaders complained that Orthodox Jews were being favored once again and that Conservative Jews were being excluded from the panel.

Rabbi Mary L. Zamore became the "first Reform mashgiach" when she supervised a kosher bakery in New Jersey from 1997 to 2001.

=== Gender ===
Although the vast majority of mashgichim are men, most supervising agencies employ women as mashgichot as well. While the profession has historically been very male dominated, an increasing number of women are becoming mashgichot. Shira Feder writing for The Forward has stated that in most kosher homes "you'll find a female mashgiach bustling about the kitchen — it is often women, after all, who are tasked with the job of maintaining a kosher kitchen... Yet this role rarely translates into the professional food industry." The greatest number of mashgichot work in the food services industry in the New York City and Los Angeles metropolitan regions. Women working as mashgichot sometimes report lower pay than male mashgichim, discriminatory hiring practices, and lack of respect from employers, coworkers, and customers.

The first training course for mashgichot was held in Baltimore in the fall of 2009, organized by Star-K.

In 2012, the Orthodox Jewish women's advocacy group Emunah petitioned the Supreme Court of Israel concerning the rights of women to serve as mashgichot. In 2013, the Chief Rabbinate of Israel voted to allow women to serve as mashgichot. In 2014, nine women took the Chief Rabbinate's kosher certification exam in Jerusalem. The liberal Orthodox Tzohar organization, which offers kosher certification independent of the Chief Rabbinate, employed 5 mashgichot as of 2019.

Rabbi Moshe Feinstein permitted women to serve as mashgichot. Rabbi Meir Amsel issued a rebuttal to Rabbi Feinstein, arguing that women serving as mashgichot could lead to women rabbis.

== Responsibilities ==
Depending on the assignment, mashgichim must be familiar with the halakhas of slaughtering meat, cooking meat and fish, and separating meat and dairy. They must be knowledgeable about the way boilers and shipping vessels work, since high temperatures and long storage times can affect the status of kosher foods. It has been said that in addition to knowledge of Jewish law, mashgichim must be familiar with "engineering, entomology, metallurgy, boiler treatment, food chemistry, and world market trends".

Mashgichim are required whenever meat or fish is prepared or cooked. They check fresh eggs for blood spots before they are used in cooking, and must inspect all vegetables for forbidden insects before use. They are responsible for performing the dough offering, the tithe of dough set aside for consumption by a kohen. Some perform this in the diaspora, whereas in Israel it is always burnt.

Mashgichim must also light pilot lights and turn on cooking and heating equipment to satisfy minimum requirements of bishul Yisrael (food cooked by a Jew) and pas Yisroel (bread baked by a Jew), in a way that a Jew must be involved in the cooking of any kosher food "fit for a king's table." To satisfy requirements for Sephardic Jews, the mashgiah may be required to play an even more active role in the cooking process.

Often, the primary responsibility of mashgichim is washing and inspecting produce to ensure there is no infestation. The skill of inspecting produce properly requires much training and expertise. One of the most pressing jobs of mashgichim, however, is the checking in and verification of shipments. Mashgichim must ensure that every food product that arrives at the facility has a reliable hekhsher (certification) before it is used. Suppliers often substitute products that are out of stock with non-kosher products. Non-kosher establishments would generally not mind these substitutions. For a kosher establishment, however, these substitutions can cause major problems. If a product arrives without a hekhsher, mashgichim must make sure the product is clearly marked as non-kosher and is not used, but returned to the supplier. Sometimes a product arrives that is purportedly kosher, but no hekhsher can be found. In this case, the mashgiach/mashgicha obtains a valid letter of certification from the certifying rabbi or kashrut agency, usually by contacting the manufacturer. In addition to checking hekhsherim, mashgichim must also check that all meat products that arrive are double sealed, usually by inner and outer plastic bags or an inner plastic bag and a sealed box, and that all wine is kosher wine.

Great strides, in the last several years, have been made towards ensuring that kosher products are transported only in kosher approved tanker trucks.

In many settings, mashgichim are merely responsible for making sure that the above tasks are performed by responsible, knowledgeable, and well-trained persons.

Mashgichim play social as well as technical roles in explaining kosher rules to the Jewish and non-Jewish community and forging close relationships with employees and customers.

== See also ==
- Kosher certification agency – Organization certifying that items are kosher
- Hechsher – Organization certifying that items are kosher
- Kashrut – Jewish dietary laws
- Shechita – Ritual slaughter of an animal in Jewish law
