= Temecula Valley Balloon & Wine Festival =

Annual event in Temecula, California, United States

Temecula Valley Balloon and Wine Festival
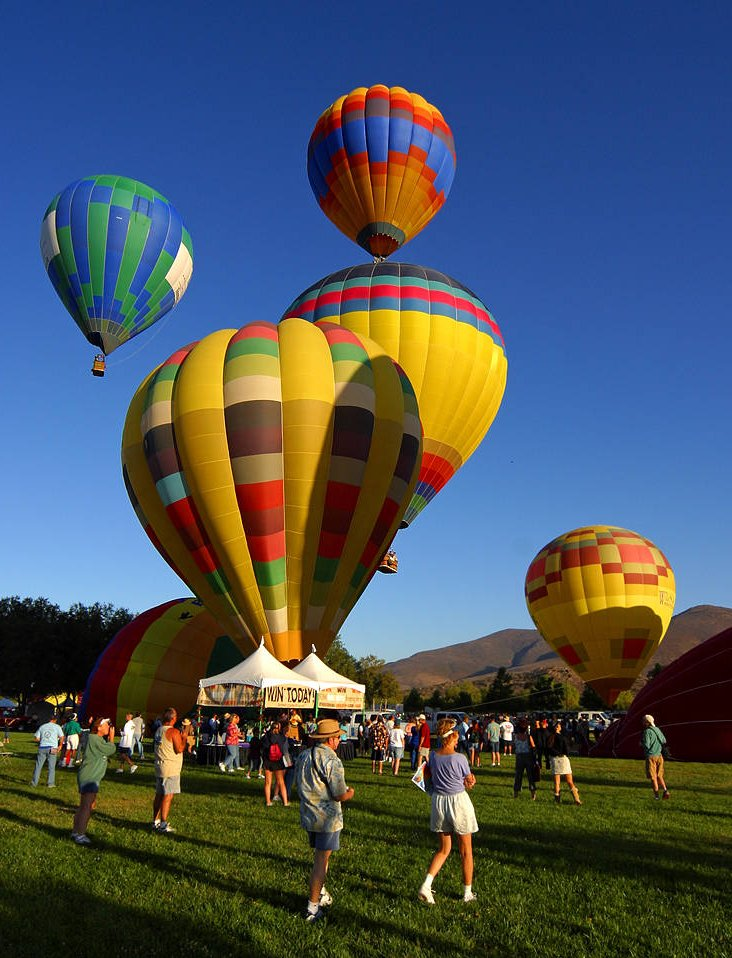
- Location: Temecula, California
- Years active: 1984–2019, 2022– (cancelled in 2020−21)
- Website: http://www.tvbwf.com/

The Temecula Valley Balloon and Wine Festival is held annually, the first weekend of June at Lake Skinner Recreation Area in the Temecula Valley AVA of Southern California. The event features morning balloon launches, evening balloon glows, wine tasting from more than 20 wineries, wine competition, food and wine pairing, concerts featuring country on Friday, Classic Rock and Rock on Saturday, and Jazz on Sunday. There is also a giant arts and craft faire, kids faire, and fine art paintings on exhibit within the wine gardens. In 2020 and 2021 it was not held due to the COVID-19 pandemic.

== History ==
The Temecula Valley Balloon and Wine Festival, then known as the Rancho California Balloon and Wine Festival, was started in 1983 by Walt Darren, a commercial airline pilot and avid balloonist and by Evelyn Harker a veteran event organizer and fundraiser. The seed money was provided by Kaiser Development Company and sponsors came from the local community giving what they could with many contributions consisting of in-kind services and products.

At this time, there were only six wineries in the region. (There are over 40 wineries in the region now.) The first Balloon and Wine Festival was launched in the Spring of 1984 and was a monumental success for a town of only 9,000 residents. More than 4,000 people were in attendance that year as 35 balloons were launched from the Rancho California Plaza area off Ynez Road (now Tower Plaza).

As the Festival grew, music was added and the event was moved to the Sports Park. In 1986 as the event continued to grow, it was moved to Cherry Street and the first ever poster contest was held. During 1987–1988, the Festival was moved back to the Sports Park and in 1989, it was moved to its current location at Lake Skinner. In 1988, the Festival featured live entertainment with the Coasters and Little Anthony & The Imperials. In 1991, the Beach Boys entertained.

== Modern history ==
Today's concerts are held on two stages. Recent years have included Third Eye Blind, 3 Doors Down, Lifehouse, Daughtry, Justin Moore, Chris Young, Blake Shelton, Kenny Loggins, Sugar Ray, Collective Soul, Gin Blossoms, James Otto, Peter Frampton and Five for Fighting.

In 1991 the Temecula Valley Balloon and Wine Festival Association was formed when the Chamber of Commerce ceased producing the event. The mission statement of this new non-profit charitable organization was (and still is) to enhance the charitable, cultural, educational and economic development of the region.

During the 1992–1993 Festival years, weather grounded the hot air balloon launch but a balloon glow was presented by Paradise Chevrolet in 1993. While the theme of hot air balloons and wine has always served to anchor the event, each year new attractions have been introduced.

The 2020 festival was first rescheduled for September, then scrapped for the year due to the COVID-19 pandemic. The 37th event was deferred to May 2022.

In 2021 the festival scheduled for May 21 to May 23 was also cancelled on February 24, by order of the Riverside County Public Health Officer, due to the pandemic.

== See also ==
- Hot air balloon festivals
- Boston wine festival
- Food Network South Beach Wine and Food Festival
- Tallahassee Wine and Food Festival
- San Diego Bay Wine & Food Festival
- Naples Grape Festival
