= Boston Wine Festival =

The Boston Wine Festival, founded by Chef Daniel Bruce in 1989 is held annually at the Boston Harbor Hotel, is one of the nation's longest-running wine and food pairing series. Spanning three and a half months and including multiple events each week, the Boston Wine Festival celebrated its twentieth anniversary in January 2009. Through the festival’s 20 plus year history more than 75,000 bottles of wine have been opened and Chef Bruce has never repeated a menu, totaling 3,000 different dishes at 750 dinners served.

== History ==
For each Boston Wine Festival event, Chef Bruce invites wine makers to bring their most exclusive wines. He prepares a unique multi-course meal designed to complement the wines being served. He has served as executive chef of the Boston Harbor Hotel since 1989. Before he assumed leadership of the hotel, Chef Bruce served as executive chef of 21 Club in New York City. He was the youngest executive chef in the restaurant's history. Some of the wineries that participated in the 2009 milestone year included Caymus, Shafer, Silver Oak and Chateau Palmer. Chef Bruce expanded the festival to the Maison Dupuy in New Orleans, resulting in the French Quarter Wine Festival. In 2010, he launched the Capital Wine Festival at The Fairfax at Embassy Row in Washington, D.C., and the Berkeley Wine Festival at the Claremont Hotel Club and Spa in Berkeley, California.

== See also ==
- Food Network South Beach Wine and Food Festival
- Tallahassee Wine and Food Festival
- San Diego Bay Wine & Food Festival
- Naples Grape Festival
- Temecula Valley Balloon & Wine Festival
