= Lee Brian Schrager =

American businessman

Lee Brian Schrager is an American businessman and the senior vice president of communications and corporate social responsibility for the Southern Glazer's Wine & Spirit of America. Schrager is known for his work with the Food Network South Beach and New York City Wine and Food Festivals.

== Early life ==
Schrager was born to Ken and Marlene Schrager and grew up in Massapequa, New York. He is the second in a family of three children with one younger and one older brother.

== Education ==
Schrager graduated from the Culinary Institute of America in the 1980s.

== Career ==
Schrager started an externship at Glorious Food, a catering company. In 1987, he started a gay bar named Torpedo in South Beach before becoming the catering director at Bahia Mar. He then worked for InterContinental Hotels Group across the US for 17 years where he started as a room service manager. Later, Schrager became IHG's vice president of food and beverage. Schrager was hired by Southern Glazer's Wine & Spirit in 2000 to improve a wine testing event to raise funds for the FIU School of Hospitality & Tourism Management. The wine testing event eventually became the Food Network South Beach Wine & Food Festival.

=== Festivals ===
==== South Beach Wine & Food Festival ====
Renamed from the Florida Extravaganza in 2002 by Schrager, the South Beach Wine & Food Festival was originally a one day wine tasting dinner held to raise funds for the FIU School of Hospitality & Tourism Management. The event takes place in Miami-Dade and Broward counties and lasts five days with more than 60,000 attendees. The festival is sponsored by Food Network.

==== New York City Wine & Food Festival ====
The New York City Wine & Food Festival was created in 2008 after the success of the South Beach Wine & Food Festival. It follows the same model and supports non-profit organizations like No Kid Hungry and Food Bank For New York City.

== Personal life ==
Schrager's husband is Ricardo Restrepo, a pediatric radiologist.

== Books ==
- America's Best Breakfasts: Favorite Local Recipes from Coast to Coast (with Adeena Sussman)
- Food Network South Beach Wine & Food Festival Cookbook: Recipes and Behind-the-scenes Stories from America's Hottest Chefs (with Julie Mautner)
- Fried & True: More than 50 Recipes for America's Best Fried Chicken and Sides (with Adeena Sussman, foreword by Whoopi Goldberg)
