= Naples Grape Festival =

Food festival in Naples, New York

Coordinates: 42.620227°N 77.399495°W

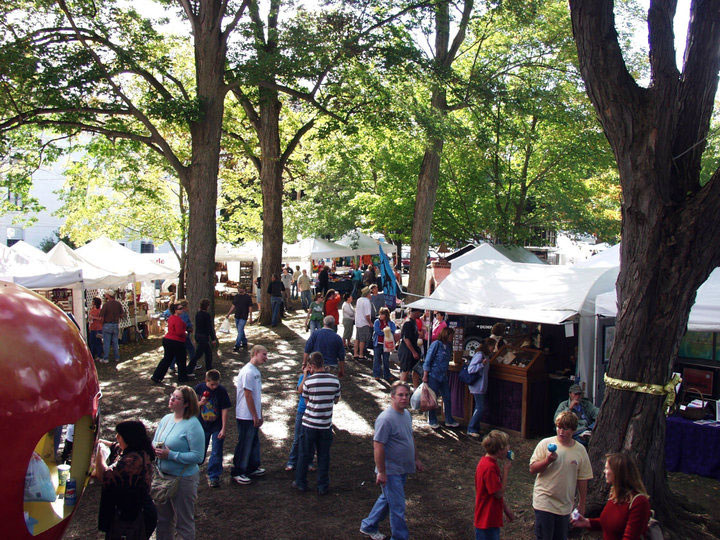
Naples Grape Festival

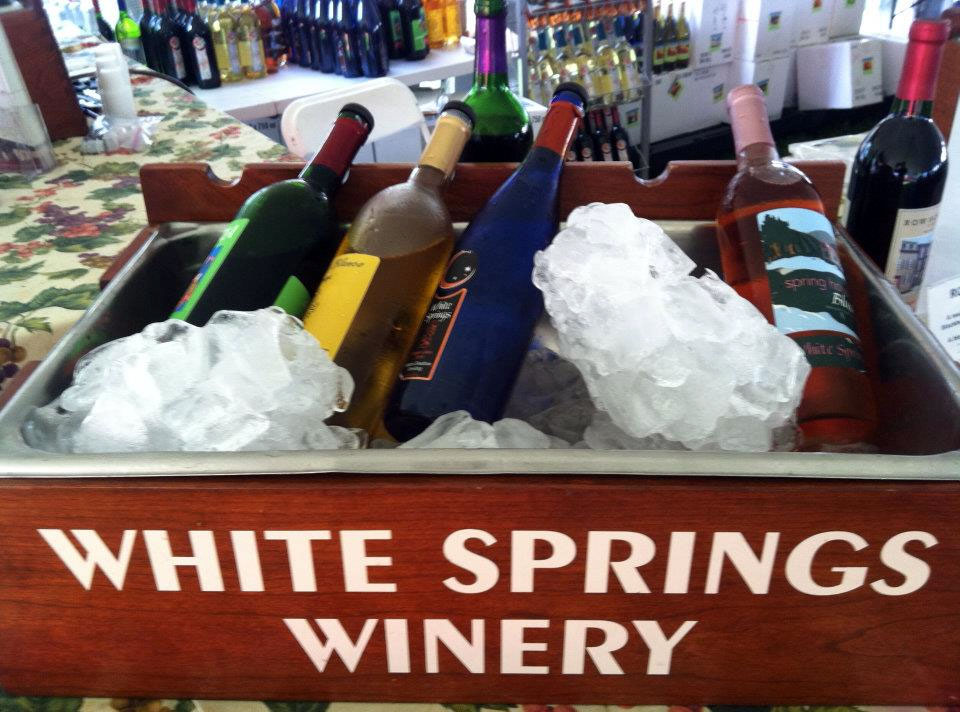
Finger Lakes wine tent participant

The Naples Grape Festival is an annual festival in Naples, New York, United States, dedicated to grapes. The town of Naples is in the center of Finger Lakes American Viticultural Area (AVA), a region known for grape-growing and wine making in the Finger Lakes area of Upstate New York. Around 80,000 people attend the festival each year.

The festival, which has been held since 1961, includes arts and crafts vendors, a wine-tasting tent, food, live music, and a grape pie contest. One festival casualty was in 2020, when the COVID-19 pandemic caused it to be cancelled.

== See also ==
- Boston wine festival
- Food Network South Beach Wine and Food Festival
- Tallahassee Wine and Food Festival
- San Diego Bay Wine & Food Festival
- Temecula Valley Balloon & Wine Festival
