= Naples (village), New York =

Naples, New York
- Village
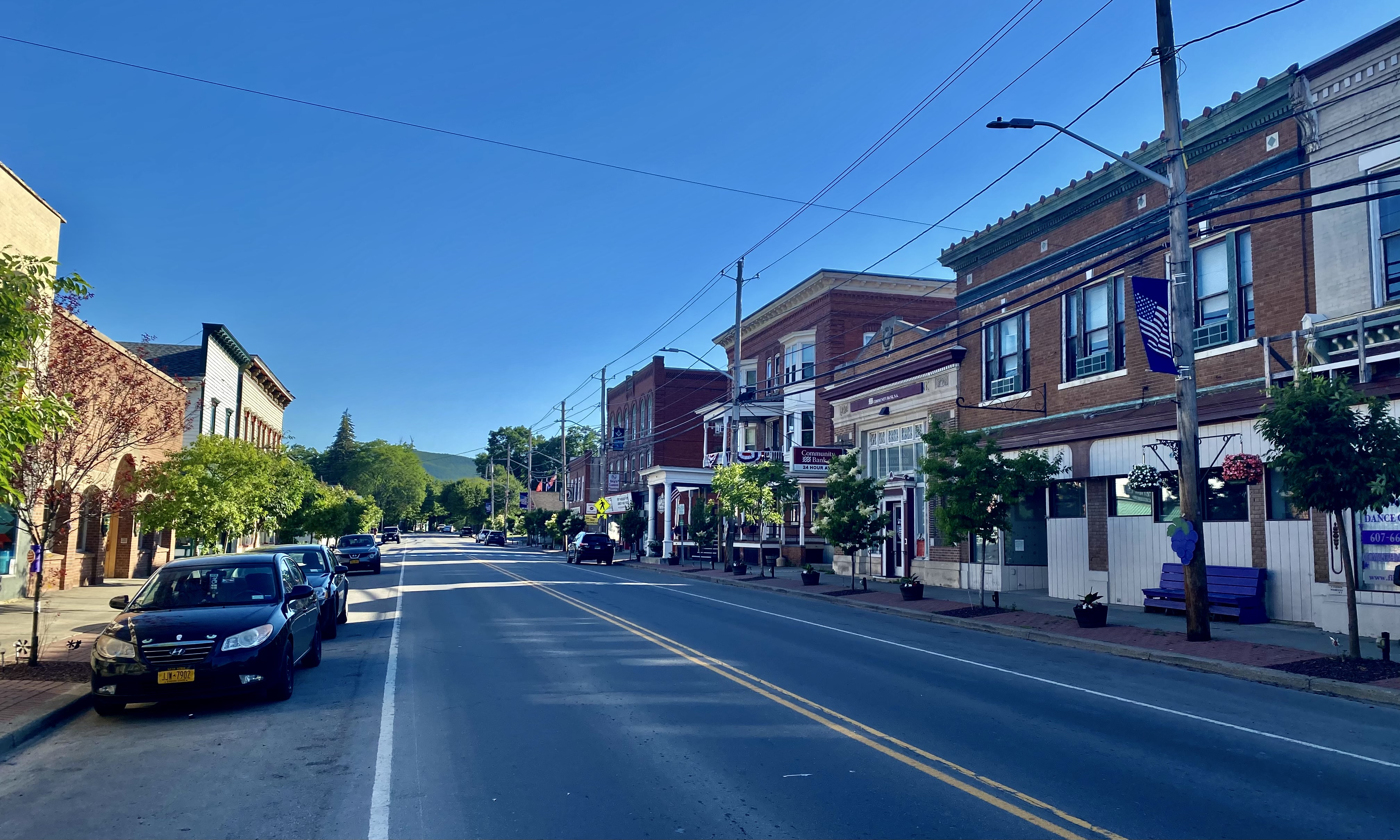
- South Main Street as seen in June 2021

- Location within the state of New York
- Coordinates: 42°36′58″N 77°24′9″W
- Country: United States
- State: New York
- County: Ontario

Area
  - Total: 0.97 sq mi (2.50 km^{2})
  - Land: 0.97 sq mi (2.50 km^{2})
  - Water: 0 sq mi (0.00 km^{2})
- Elevation: 804 ft (245 m)

Population (2020)
  - Total: 931
  - Density: 963.4/sq mi (371.99/km^{2})
- Time zone: UTC-5 (Eastern (EST))
  - Summer (DST): UTC-4 (EDT)
- ZIP code: 14512
- Area code: 585
- FIPS code: 36-49429
- GNIS feature ID: 0958258

Naples is a village in Ontario County, New York, United States. The population was 1,041 at the 2010 census. It is a part of the Town of Naples, known as an important grape-growing region.

== History ==
The village, one of the first places populated by pioneers, was first settled around 1790. The village was incorporated in 1894. The Village of Naples has had votes in 1994, 2001 and June 2005 respectively in reference to dissolving the village into the Town of Naples, with all three results going against the proposal. The Naples Branch of the Lehigh Valley Railroad terminated in the village.

The Ephraim Cleveland House, Naples Memorial Town Hall and Morgan Hook and Ladder Company are listed on the National Register of Historic Places.

== Geography ==
Naples is located at 42°36′57″N 77°24′9″W (42.616047, -77.402601).

According to the United States Census Bureau, the village has a total area of 1.0 square mile (2.5 km^{2}), all land, though nearby other important water sources, being southwest of Canandaigua Lake, one of the Finger Lakes, and nearby the Naples Creek towards the lake and Grimes Glen.

New York State Route 21, New York State Route 53, and New York State Route 245 converge on the village, along with County Roads 33 and 36.

== Demographics ==
Historical population
Census	Pop.	Note	%±
1870	902		—
1880	1,360		50.8%
1890	1,266		−6.9%
1900	1,048		−17.2%
1910	1,093		4.3%
1920	1,148		5.0%
1930	1,070		−6.8%
1940	1,152		7.7%
1950	1,141		−1.0%
1960	1,237		8.4%
1970	1,324		7.0%
1980	1,225		−7.5%
1990	1,237		1.0%
2000	1,072		−13.3%
2010	1,041		−2.9%
2020	931		−10.6%
U.S. Decennial Census

As of the census of 2000, there were 1,072 people, 453 households, and 284 families residing in the village. The population density was 1,097.3 inhabitants per square mile (423.7/km^{2}). There were 500 housing units at an average density of 511.8 per square mile (197.6/km^{2}). The racial makeup of the village was 98.60% White, 0.56% Asian, 0.47% from other races, and 0.37% from two or more races. Hispanic or Latino of any race were 1.21% of the population.

There were 453 households, out of which 31.6% had children under the age of 18 living with them, 45.3% were married couples living together, 13.0% had a female householder with no husband present, and 37.3% were non-families. 32.0% of all households were made up of individuals, and 15.7% had someone living alone who was 65 years of age or older. The average household size was 2.37 and the average family size was 2.98.

In the village, the population was spread out, with 26.8% under the age of 18, 5.4% from 18 to 24, 26.9% from 25 to 44, 25.0% from 45 to 64, and 16.0% who were 65 years of age or older. The median age was 39 years. For every 100 females, there were 94.2 males. For every 100 females age 18 and over, there were 83.4 males.

The median income for a household in the village was $34,219, and the median income for a family was $42,841. Males had a median income of $34,107 versus $21,563 for females. The per capita income for the village was $16,067. About 12.0% of families and 13.2% of the population were below the poverty line, including 18.0% of those under age 18 and 17.4% of those age 65 or over.

== Notable people ==
- Emory B. Pottle, former US Congressman
- Meghan Musnicki, American rower and two-time Olympic gold medalist
