= Bartenura =

Bartenura or variants may refer to:

- Obadiah ben Abraham of Bartenura, a 15th-century Italian rabbi
- Bartenura, an Italian wine brand
- Bertinoro, a town in Italy
