= Herzog Wine Cellars =

Kosher winery in Oxnard, California

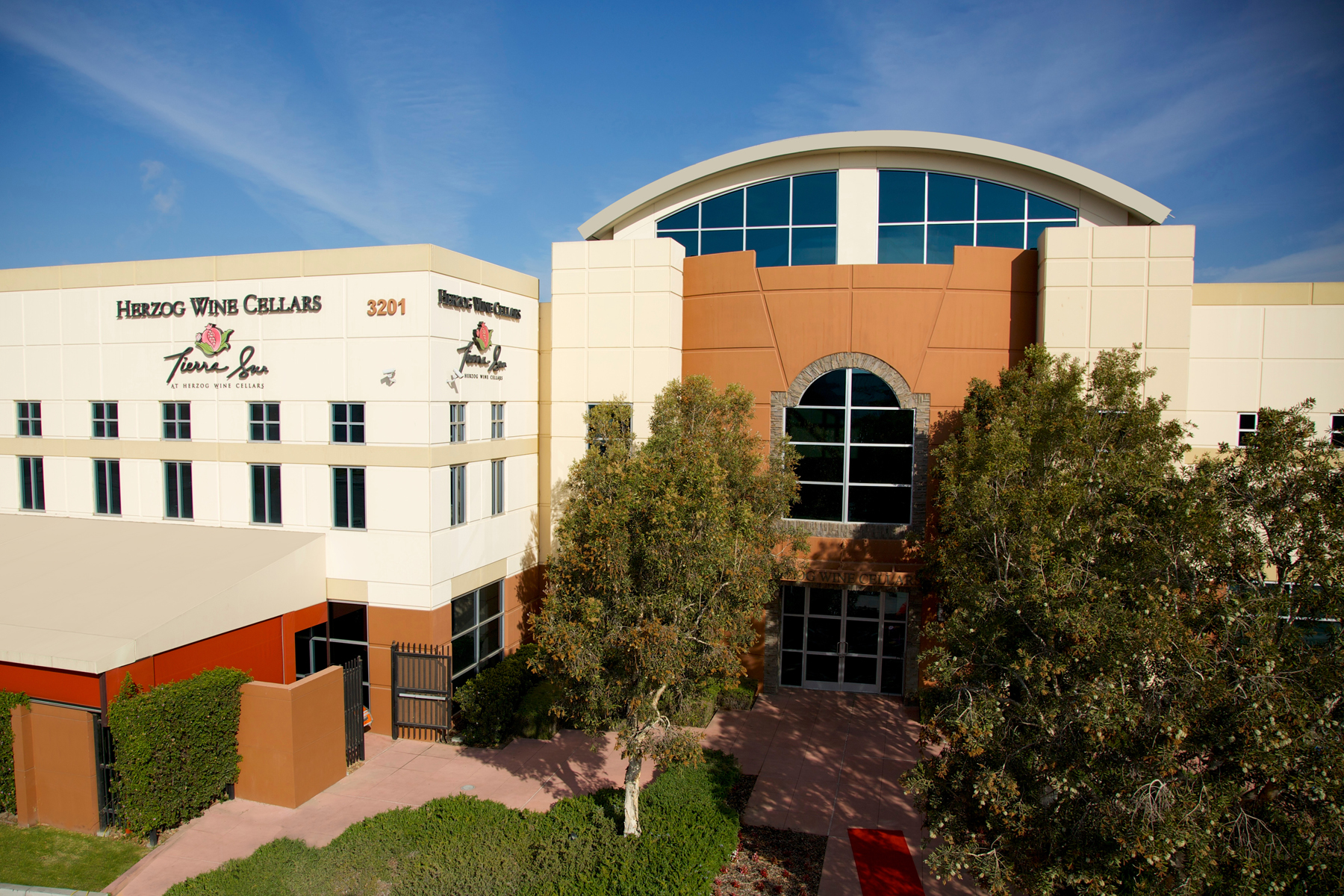
- Location: Oxnard, California, United States
- Coordinates: 34°12′20″N 119°07′50″W
- First vines planted: 1840
- Opened to the public: 2005
- Key people: Joseph Herzog (Partner, Vice President); David Galzignato (Director of Winemaking and Operations); Alicia Wilbur (Production Winemaker)
- Parent company: Royal Wine
- Cases/yr: 250,000
- Distribution: International
- Website: herzogwine.com

Herzog Wine Cellars is a kosher winery in Oxnard, California. The largest fully kosher winery in the United States, it produces approximately 250,000 cases of wine annually and is known for its high-quality kosher wines under various labels.

== History ==
Menahem Emanuel Herzog established a distillery, winery, and brewery in Vrbové, Slovakia in 1840. During the Austro-Hungarian Empire's period of growth, the Herzog wines gained the attention of Franz Joseph I of Austria who granted Phillip Herzog the title of baron and commissioned the family to produce wine for the royal court in 1876.

During the Nazi persecution of Jews, the winery was seized by the Nazis and Yohanan Herzog, Phillip's son, was killed in Auschwitz. Eugene Herzog, Phillip's grandson, survived the Holocaust and reclaimed the winery. However, during the rise of communism in Slovakia Eugene fled to the United States in 1948 and settled in New York City, where he worked for the Royal Wine Company, as a winemaker, sales manager, and truck driver. He was paid in company shares and eventually became the majority stockholder before buying the company in 1958. He renamed the company Kedem Winery and expanded the range of wines.

In 1985, under David Herzog, they launched the 'Baron Herzog' wine label, sourcing grapes from California's Napa Valley, Lodi, and Clarksburg regions. The first year they created five wines: Cabernet Sauvignon, Zinfandel, White Zinfandel, Chardonnay and Chenin Blanc. They started in Napa Valley, then moved to south of San Francisco before finally building their current winery in Ventura County, California in 2005.

The winery dropped the word "Baron" from their name, becoming Herzog Wine Cellars, after they began producing regional "Special Reserve" wines. Their wines scored 94 points in the Wine Spectator and Wine Enthusiast in the late 1990s, which were then the highest scores achieved by a kosher wine.

== Currently ==
The winery is currently led by Joseph Herzog, a grandson of Eugene, in its eighth generation of the Herzog family leadership. The director of winemaking and operations is David Galzignato, and Alicia Wilbur serves as production winemaker. They produce approximately 250,000 cases per year, ranging from $6 to $200. The labels include Herzog Lineage, Jeunesse, Baron Herzog, Variations, Special Reserve, Single Vineyard, Special Edition, and others, as well as the flagship Generation VIII. One of their most popular wines is the Bartenura Moscato, which at one stage was the top selling Moscato in the United States.

== See also ==
- Jewish cuisine
