= Dov Behr Manischewitz =

Lithuanian-American rabbi and businessman

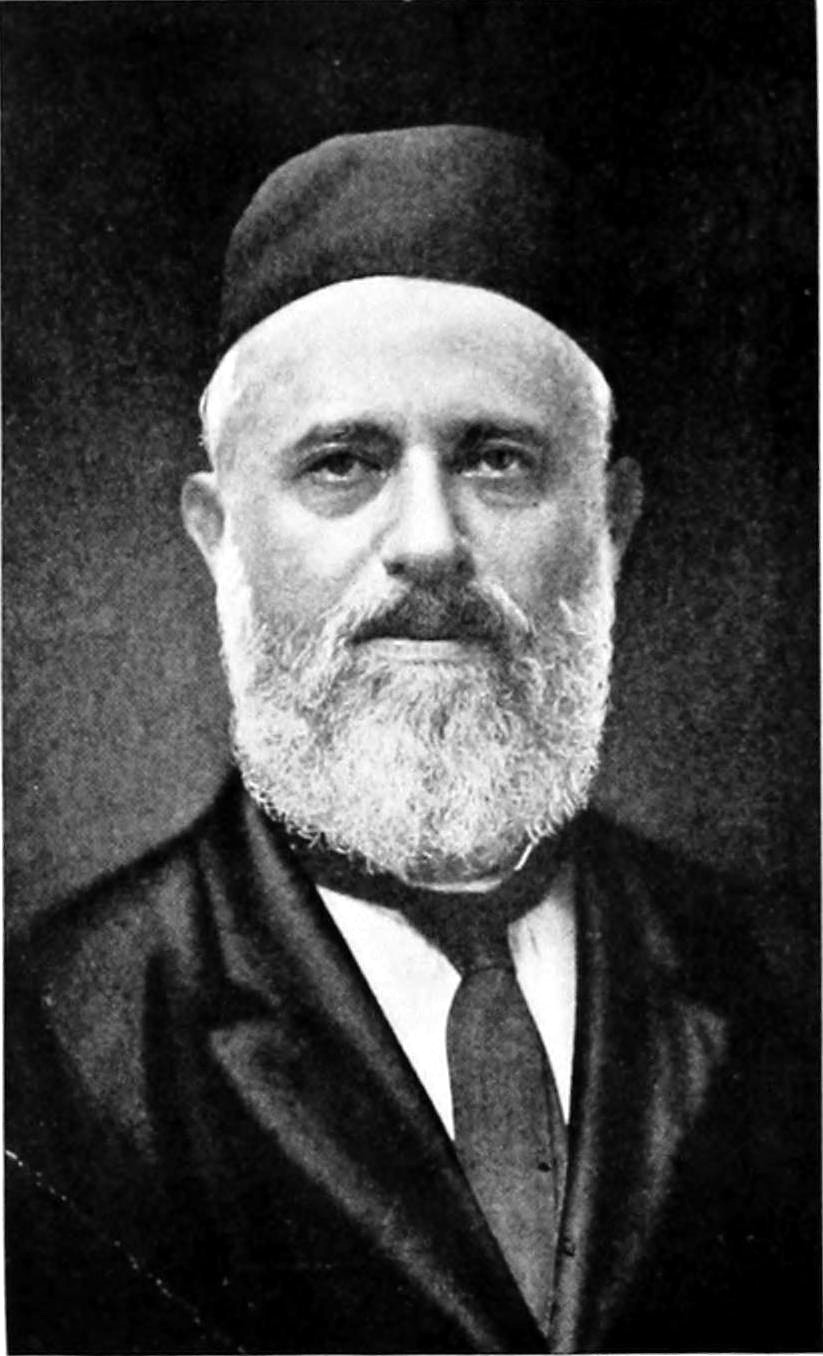
- Rabbi Manischewitz
- Born: Dov Behr Abramson c. 1857; Salantai, Kovno, Lithuania
- Died: March 8, 1914 (aged 56–57); Cincinnati, Ohio, United States
- Other names: Dov Ber, Dov Baer, Dov Bear, Dave Behr, David Behr
- Occupations: Rabbi, businessman
- Known for: Manufacture of matzah, and for his creation of the company bearing his name.

Dov Behr Manischewitz (1856 or 1857 or 1858 – March 8, 1914), also known as Dov Ber, Dov Baer, Dov Bear, Dave Behr, and David Behr, and born Dov Behr Abramson, was a Lithuanian-American rabbi and businessman, known for his innovations in the manufacture of matzah, and for his creation of the company bearing his name.

== Early life ==
Manischewitz was born and raised in Salant (Salantai), and studied under Rabbi Israel Salanter in Memel, where he trained as a shochet.

In 1885, he emigrated to the United States, using the identification documents of a dead man named "Manischewitz". Although he stated that he emigrated because he had been hired as a shochet by the Jewish community of Cincinnati, other reasons have been suggested, including that it was in response to the then-imminent expulsion of Jews from Memel, or that it was in order to avoid compulsory military service.

== Professional life ==
In Cincinnati, Manischewitz initially worked as a shochet and peddler; since matzah was not available, he made his own in his basement – originally for his circle of acquaintances, but later for Jews throughout the city.

Eventually his merchandise was successful enough that he undertook mass production, and shifted to new, mechanized methods, including gas stoves and the conveyor belt-based "traveling carrier bake-oven", which he patented. These methods were initially controversial, and questions were raised as to whether machine-made food complied with kashrut; however, Manischewitz argued his case with American rabbinical authorities, who decided in his favor (historian Zalman Alpert has noted that both Manischewitz and the American rabbinical authorities were of the Lithuanian Jewish tradition).

His matzah business was successful enough that in 1913, he was able to move to the upscale Cincinnati neighborhood of Walnut Hills. As well, he sponsored the creation of the Manischewitz yeshiva in what was then Palestine; decades later, his sons argued in court that their continued funding of the yeshiva was a business expense, as its graduates would help to spread the idea that machine-made matzah could still be kosher.

== Death ==
Manischewitz died in 1914, and is buried in Beth Hamedrash Hagodol cemetery, Covedale.
