= Streit's =

American kosher food producer

Aron Streit, Inc.
- Type: Private
- Industry: Food
- Founded: Manhattan, New York City, U.S. (1916)
- Founder: Aron Streit
- Headquarters: Orangeburg, New York, United States
- Area served: United States Other International Cities
- Products: Kosher Food Products
- Website: StreitsMatzo.com

Aron Streit, Inc. (sold under the name Streit's) is a kosher food company founded in Manhattan, New York City, best known for its matzo. It is the only family-owned and operated matzo company in the United States, and distributes matzo in select international markets. Streit's and its major competitor, New Jersey–based Manischewitz, together hold about 40 percent of the US matzo market.

The factory follows strict kosher laws. Only shomer Shabbat (Sabbath-observing) Jews are allowed to touch the dough. However, once the dough is baked, people of any religion and non-shomer Shabbat Jews are allowed to touch the matzo. The entire process of making the matzo is under Rabbinic supervision. During Passover, Jews are not allowed to eat leavened bread, so the dough must be baked within 18 minutes before it has had time to rise. If the dough sits for longer than this, it is considered chametz – no longer kosher for Passover – and must be discarded.

== History ==
The company was founded in 1916 by Aron Streit, a Jewish immigrant from Austria who had made matzo there in the late 1800s. Its first factory was on Pitt Street on the Lower East Side of Manhattan. There, Streit and his business associate Rabbi Weinberger made each piece of matzo by hand. In 1925, with the growing number of Jewish immigrants congregating on the Lower East Side, Streit, along with his two sons, Jack and Irving, moved his business to nearby 150 Rivington Street. Soon thereafter they bought the adjacent buildings, where the company operated for 90 years, before moving in 2015.

== Lower East Side factory ==
Streit's 47,000-square-foot (4,400 m^{2}) matzo factory, along with Katz's Delicatessen and Yonah Schimmel's Knish Bakery, was a surviving piece of the Lower East Side's Jewish heritage. At the turn of the 20th century, Jews, along with other European immigrants, were crammed into the many unsanitary tenements of the Lower East Side. In 1915 they made up 60 percent of the Lower East Side population. Because of the large Jewish presence, Jewish-centric businesses like Streit's opened and flourished. However, because of the poor living conditions, as soon as they financially could, many Jewish families moved out of the tenements to other areas in New York City, namely uptown and Brooklyn, slowly making Streit's a relic of the past.

Streit's Lower East Side matzo factory usually baked about 16,000 pounds (7,300 kg) of matzo each day. In preparation for Passover the factory ran 20 hours a day, testing its 30,000 pounds (14,000 kg) per day capacity.

== New factory ==
Since the 1980s the Lower East Side has experienced hyper-gentrification. The neighborhood is now a burgeoning area with rising rents. The Streit family even considered at one point opening a café or bar that serves matzo, to go with the Lower East Side's new nightlife scene.

On December 20, 2007, it was announced that the factory had been listed for sale for $25 million. The Streit's family cited noise complaints, congested streets, and their desire to modernize its equipment as the reasons for their eventual move. Its realtor, Massey Knakel Realty Services, commented "the building will most likely be torn down and converted into luxury condominiums."

Midtown East-based Cogswell Realty bought the factory for $30.75 million in 2015. Cogswell closed on the properties, which together span roughly 50,000 square feet, in May 2015. Cogswell Lee Development and Gluck+, which is also the project's architect, are developing the condo building, and plan to festoon the lobby with Streit's memorabilia

The new Streit's factory at 171 Route 303, Orangeburg, New York, replaced the factory in Manhattan and warehouse and dry pack facility in Moonachie, New Jersey. Bag-and-box mixes like the matzo ball and soup mix, potato pancake mix, and most of the other side items had been made in New Jersey for years.

== Products ==
Besides matzo, Streit's produces many other kosher products under its name. They also operate a separate label of foods called Ethnic Delights, which is mainly condiments and seasonings.

== See also ==
- Yehuda Matzos
- Manischewitz
