= Manischewitz =

American brand of kosher products

The Manischewitz Company
- Type: Privately held company
- Industry: Kosher Foods
- Founded: 1888; 138 years ago in Cincinnati, Ohio
- Founder: Dov Behr Manischewitz
- Headquarters: 80 Avenue K, Newark, New Jersey, United States
- Area served: Nationwide
- Products: Matzo; Kosher wine; Kosher Foods
- Owner: Kayco Kosher & Beyond - Bayonne, NJ
- Website: manischewitz.com

Manischewitz (/ˌmænɪˈʃɛvɪts/; Hebrew: מנישביץ) is a brand of kosher products founded in 1888 in Cincinnati, Ohio, and best known for its matzo and kosher wine. It became a public corporation in 1923 but remained under family control until January 1991, when it was bought out by a private equity firm. On April 7, 2014, Sankaty Advisors, an arm of the private equity firm Bain Capital, bought the company from a group that included the investment firm Harbinger. It is the world's largest matzo manufacturer, one of America's largest kosher brands, and the first American exporter of matzo.

== History ==
Because matzo must go from mixing to baking in a very short period of time to prevent the possibility of the dough rising, before the mid-1800s, matzo was typically baked in purpose-built ovens located in synagogues. Starting in the mid-1800s, it was typically baked in small bakeries with specialized machines. It was often not easily accessible to non-wealthy families.

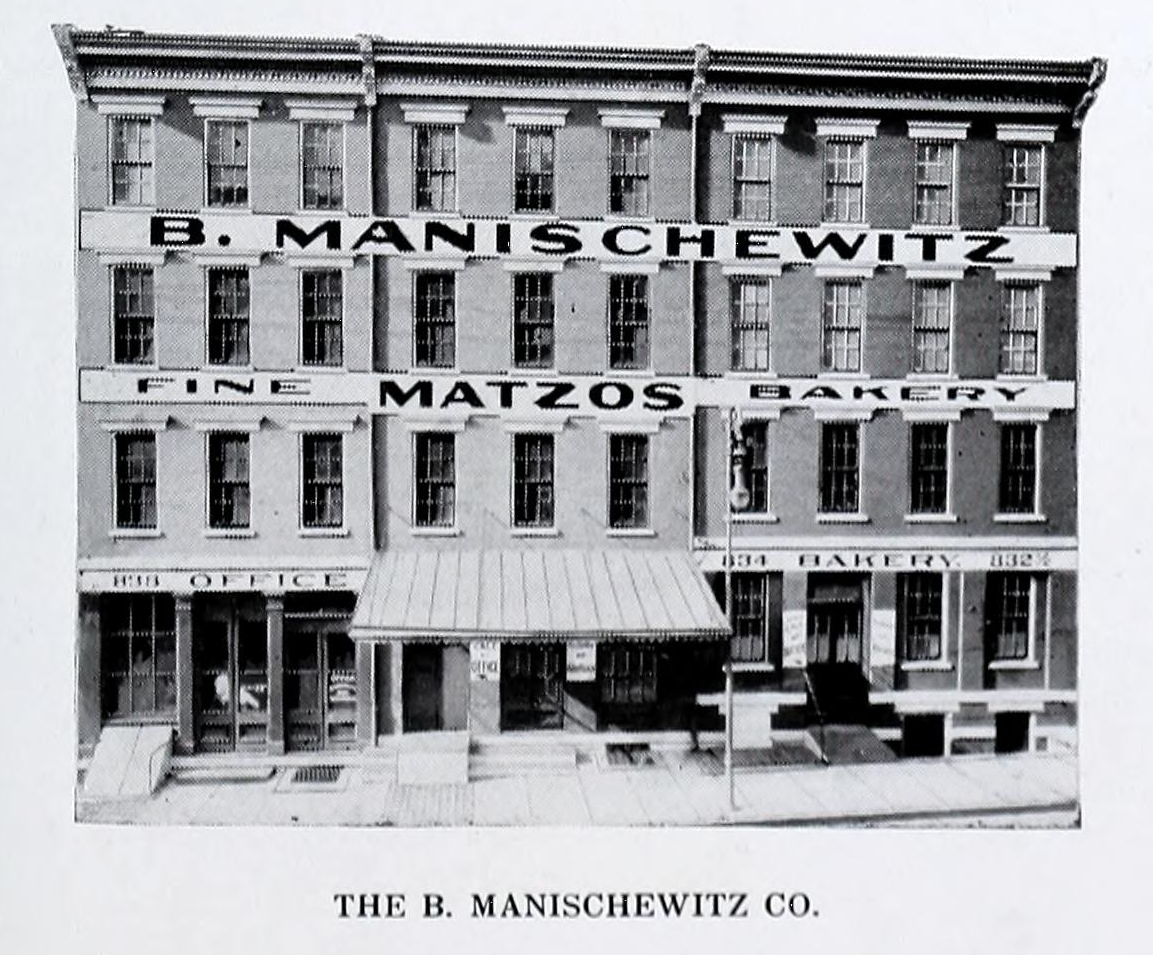
One of the locations the company held in Cincinnati in its formative years, 1926

The B. Manischewitz Company, LLC was founded by Rabbi Dov Behr Manischewitz, in 1888 in Cincinnati, Ohio. Manischewitz designed a machine that could cut and bake matzo in a form that was easily packaged and shipped, which made producing it less expensive and so more available to most US Jews. The company went public in 1923 and remained a public corporation until it was taken private in a management buyout led by Kohlberg & Company in 1990 for $42.5 million. By 1926, the Cuvier Press Club described it as the largest firm of matzo bakers in the world, and the first American exporter of the flatbread.

In the 1930s, in order to produce their products all year round, the company created Tam-Tam crackers, which are small hexagonal matzos, according to a recent book Manischewitz: The Matzo Family, written by the founder's great-granddaughter, Laura Manischewitz Alpern (though the modern Tam Tam is quite different from matzo). Their original product, the square matzo, revolutionized matzo-making, which until the family's production process, used to consist of rolling the matzo and trimming the edges by hand. It was also considered quite revolutionary to make matzos by machine. The company built a second production site on Bay Street in Jersey City, New Jersey, in 1932, to better serve the large Jewish community of the New York metropolitan area, and the Cincinnati facility was eventually closed in 1958.

In 1990, a $1 million fine was levied against the company for price fixing with its two main competitors at the time, Streit's and Horowitz-Margareten. In 1998, Richard A. Bernstein purchased the company from KKR. In 2004 its name was changed to the R.A.B. Food Group, LLC and today it is known as The Manischewitz Company.

From 2007 to 2014, Manischewitz was owned by the hedge fund Harbinger Capital. Manischewitz remains the world's top matzo manufacturer and one of America's top kosher brands. On June 14, 2011, a new 200,000-square-foot (19,000 m^{2}) facility opened at 80 Avenue K in the East Ward of Newark, New Jersey, serving as both a plant and corporate headquarters for the company. In July 2017 the company closed the facility in favor of another New Jersey location, cutting 169 jobs.

== Foods ==
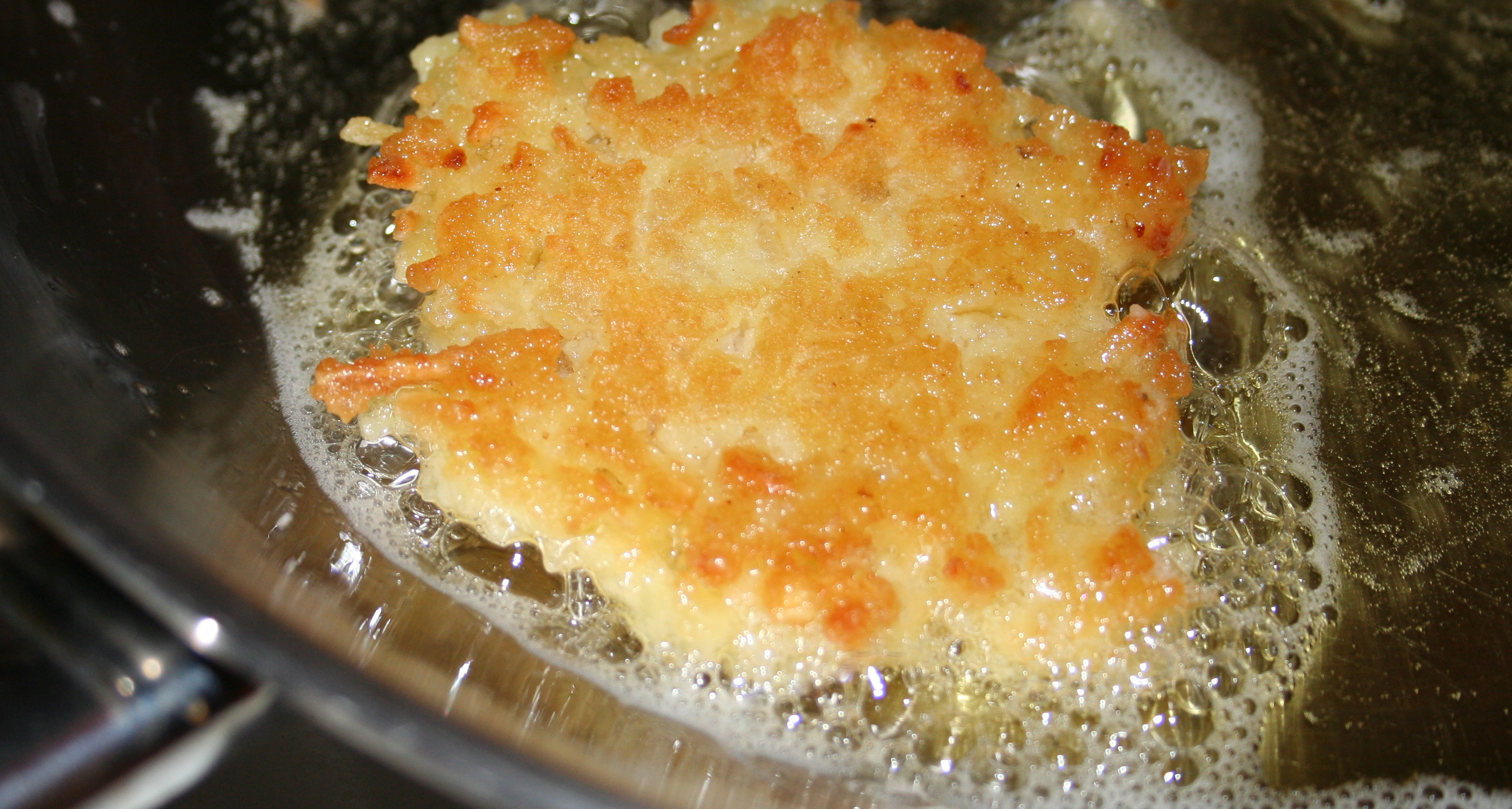
Potato latke made from Manischewitz brand mix frying in hot olive oil.

Package of Goodman's macaroons, a Manischewitz product

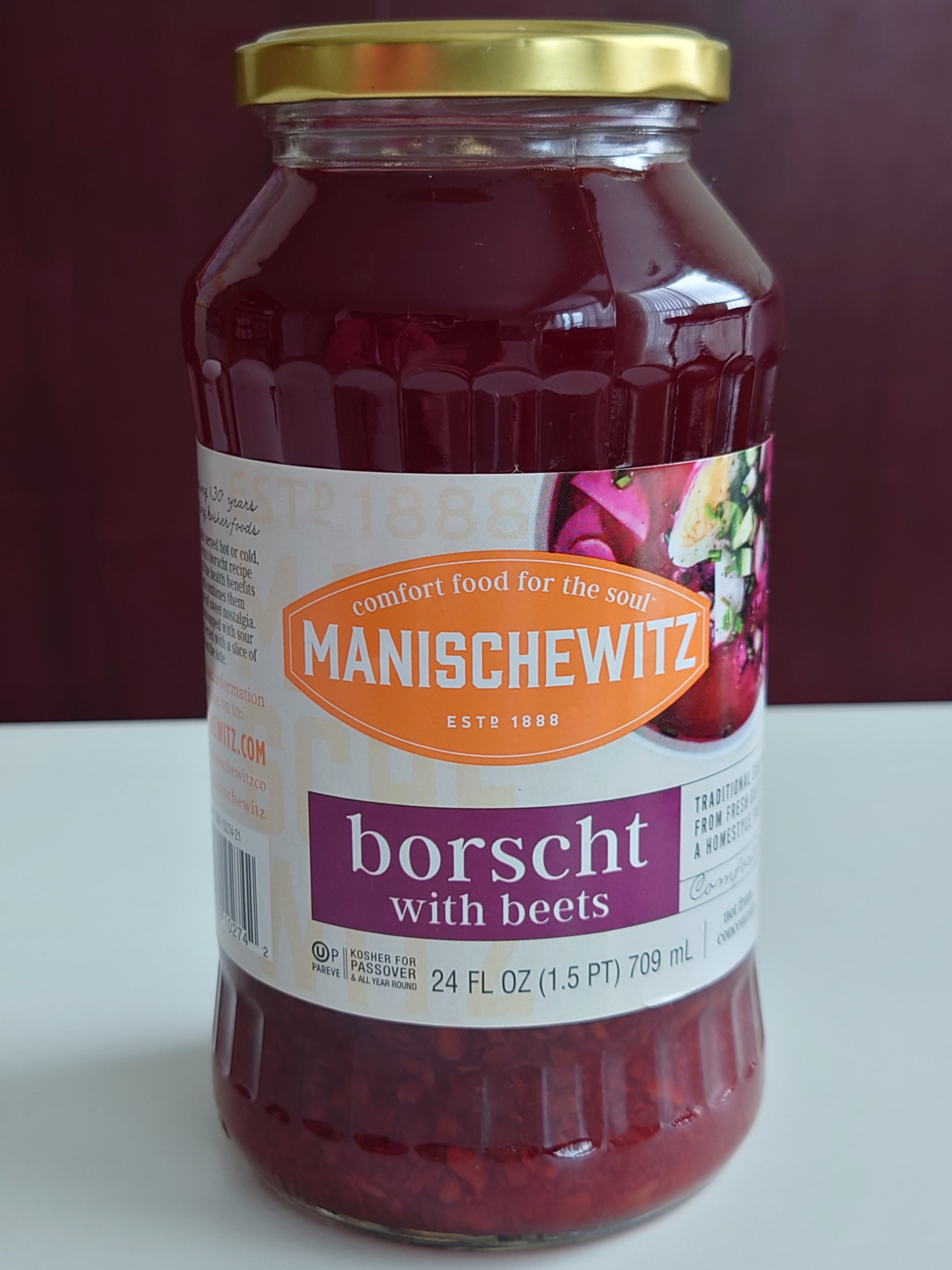
Borscht with beets

Manischewitz's main innovation - making matzos with machines instead of by hand - aroused some initial controversy. Some rabbis of the era claimed that in order to be acceptable for religious use, the matzo had to have been made by a man and not a machine. Manischewitz was ultimately able to overcome these concerns, in part by demonstrating meticulous adherence to the halakha (religious rules). During the Passover season, the company has reported producing up to 851,000 matzos per day.

In 1984, Manischewitz acquired Horowitz-Margareten Matzo and manufactures Goodman matzo and macaroons. In addition to matzo, Manischewitz-labeled foods include cookies, macaroons, pasta, and soups. Other well-known kosher brands associated with R.A.B. include Carmel, Elite, Mother's, Rokeach, Mrs. Adler's, and Tradition; many of these were acquired by R.A.B. after successful runs as independent kosher labels.

However, R.A.B. is not involved with Manischewitz wine, except in name. Beginning in 1986, it licensed the Manischewitz brand name to the Manischewitz Wine Company, a subsidiary of Canandaigua Wine Company (now Constellation Brands). In 2021, the brand was acquired by E & J Gallo Winery.

== Wine ==
The Manischewitz winery is located in Canandaigua, New York. It is the property of E & J Gallo, which continues to license the Manischewitz name from R.A.B. Foods. The winery was founded by Leo Star and run by the Star family since 1927.

The Manischewitz winery is best known for its budget concord wine, which is widely available in much of North America. Made from labrusca grapes, it is combined with a large amount of residual sugar. Because concord was popularized by the U.S. media over the years as being the kosher wine, it is often the wine that is used to celebrate Passover. However, Manischewitz's sweet Concord contains corn syrup, a sweetener derived from corn, which is forbidden during Passover among Ashkenazi Jews. Manischewitz produces special Kosher for Passover bottling of its wines, which are sweetened with cane sugar as opposed to the corn syrup that is used throughout the year.

The sweetness of Manischewitz wine and other kosher wines is often the fodder of jokes. However, Kosher wine does not have to be sweet. One of the reasons for the prevalence of sweet kosher wine in the U.S., and in the Americas generally, dates back to the early days of Jews in America, when they needed to locally produce kosher wine for the Kiddush ritual that is performed on the Shabbat and holidays. The combination of a limited choice of grape varieties that could grow in the areas where Jews had settled, along with the limited amount of time that was available to produce the wine and a market that was dominated by hard cider, yielded a bitter wine that had to be sweetened in order to make it palatable.

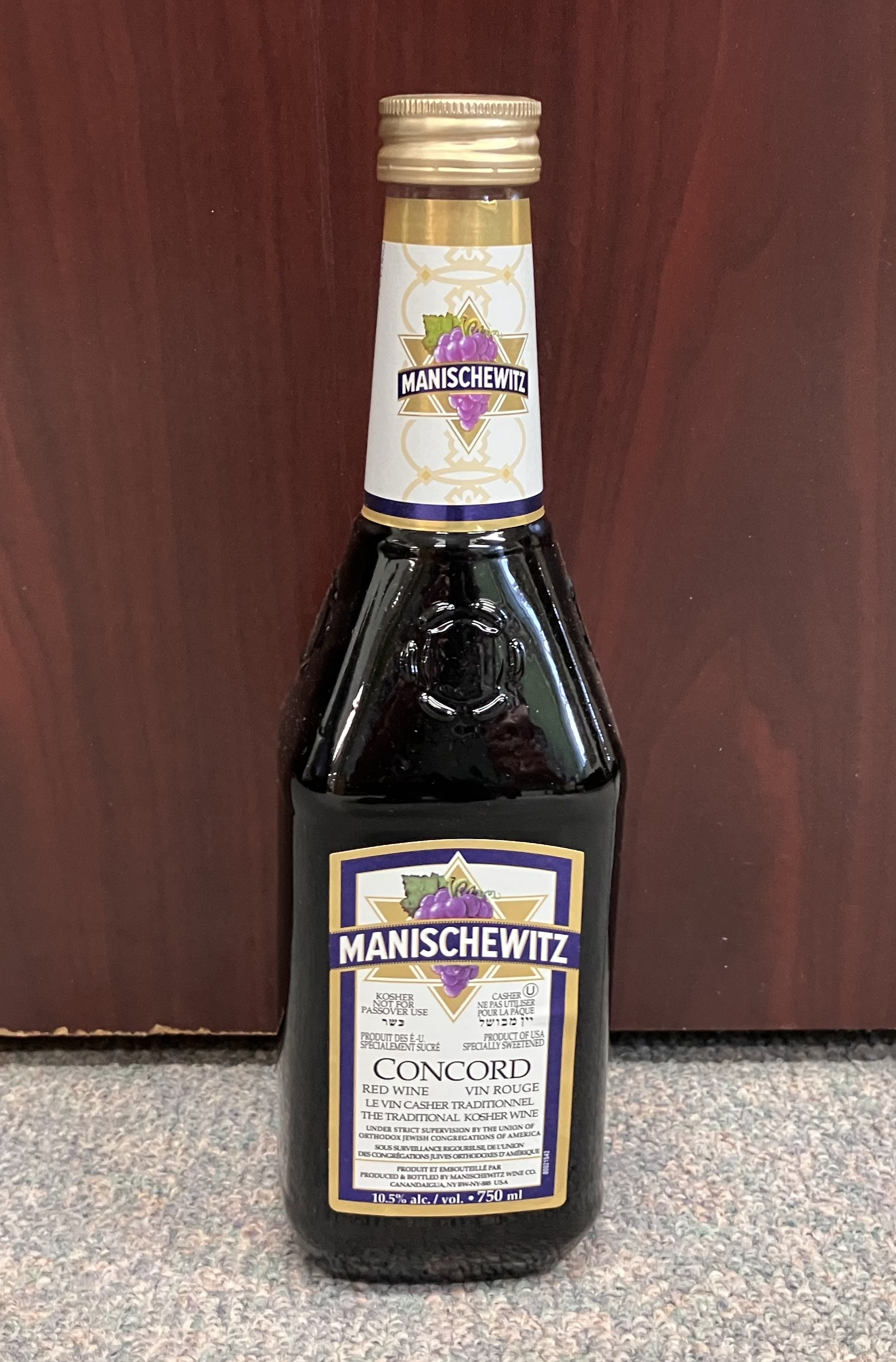
Manischewitz Concord Red Wine

Because the sweet Manischewitz variety of wine is well known in the U.S., the existence of a kosher wine industry that is anchored by vineyards in France and Israel along with a growing U.S. industry is often a surprise to Americans who are not used to taking kosher wine seriously.

=== Advertising ===
The company has used the slogan "Man-O-Manischewitz What a Wine!" for advertising. The company and the advertising campaign are fictionally represented in season five of Mad Men as a new account.

== Controversies ==
- The company was fined $1 million in 1991 for price fixing. Between 1982 and 1986, Manischewitz colluded with two other matzo producing companies to fix the price of their product during the Passover season.

== See also ==
- Kedem Winery
- Herzog Wine Cellars
- Streit's
- Yehuda Matzos
