= Kedem Winery =

American kosher beverages company

- Industry: Food
- Headquarters: Bayonne, New Jersey, U.S.
- Products: Kosher food and beverage

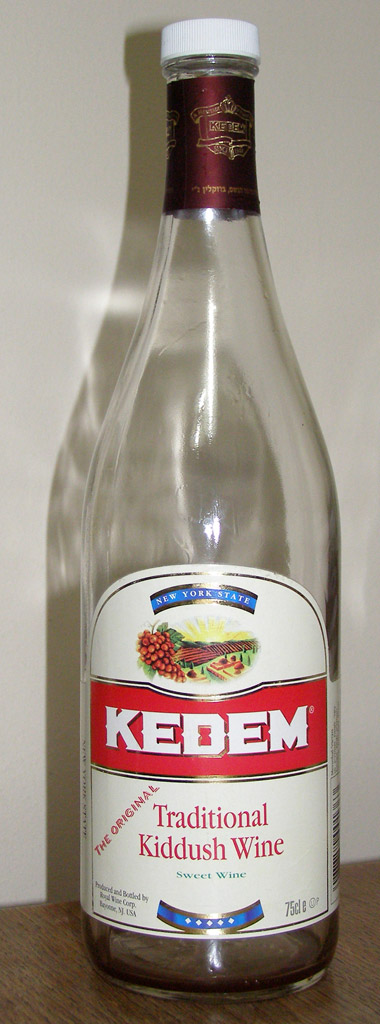
Traditional Kiddush Wine

Kedem Winery is a kosher food and beverage manufacturing and distribution company, incorporated in the United States since 1958, established as Royal Wine Corporation in June 1948 and run by the Herzog family since 1958.

Kedem currently sells over a million cases of kosher wine and grape juice annually, in sixteen countries worldwide. Formerly headquartered in New York City, it is now based in Bayonne, New Jersey. Vineyards for wine and grape juice are located in Marlboro, New York. It is especially known for its grape juice and NY state wines, as well as Kedem Tea Biscuits.

Kedem Foods is a sister brand that also produces other food products, and has merged with Kenover Marketing and B&W Foods to form the largest kosher food conglomerate, Kayco Kosher, which in turn owns other kosher food brands, such as Manischewitz, Hadar, and Gefen.

== History ==
The Herzog family first operated a winery in Czechoslovakia. The winery was the exclusive wine supplier to Emperor Franz Joseph I of Austria, who granted Philip Herzog (1843–1918) the title of baron. Though the wines for the emperor were not necessarily kosher wines, all of the other wines were produced under the full scrutiny of kosher law.

During World War II, the Herzog winery was seized by the Nazis. The Herzogs, who stayed in hiding, immigrated to the United States after the 1948 Czechoslovak coup d'état. Living in New York City, Eugene Herzog—Philip's grandson—began working for the Royal Wine Corporation and part of his salary was paid in company shares. By 1958, he was a majority stockholder and purchased the company and started doing business under the name Kedem. The current CEO of Royal Wine Corporation is Mordechai Herzog.

Kedem wines are part of the Royal Wine Corporation, the largest importer of Israeli wines and spirits in the US., which is in turn owned by KayCo, the largest Kosher food distributor.

== See also ==
- Bartenura wine
- Herzog Wine Cellars
