= Naples, New York =

Town in the United States

Naples
- Town
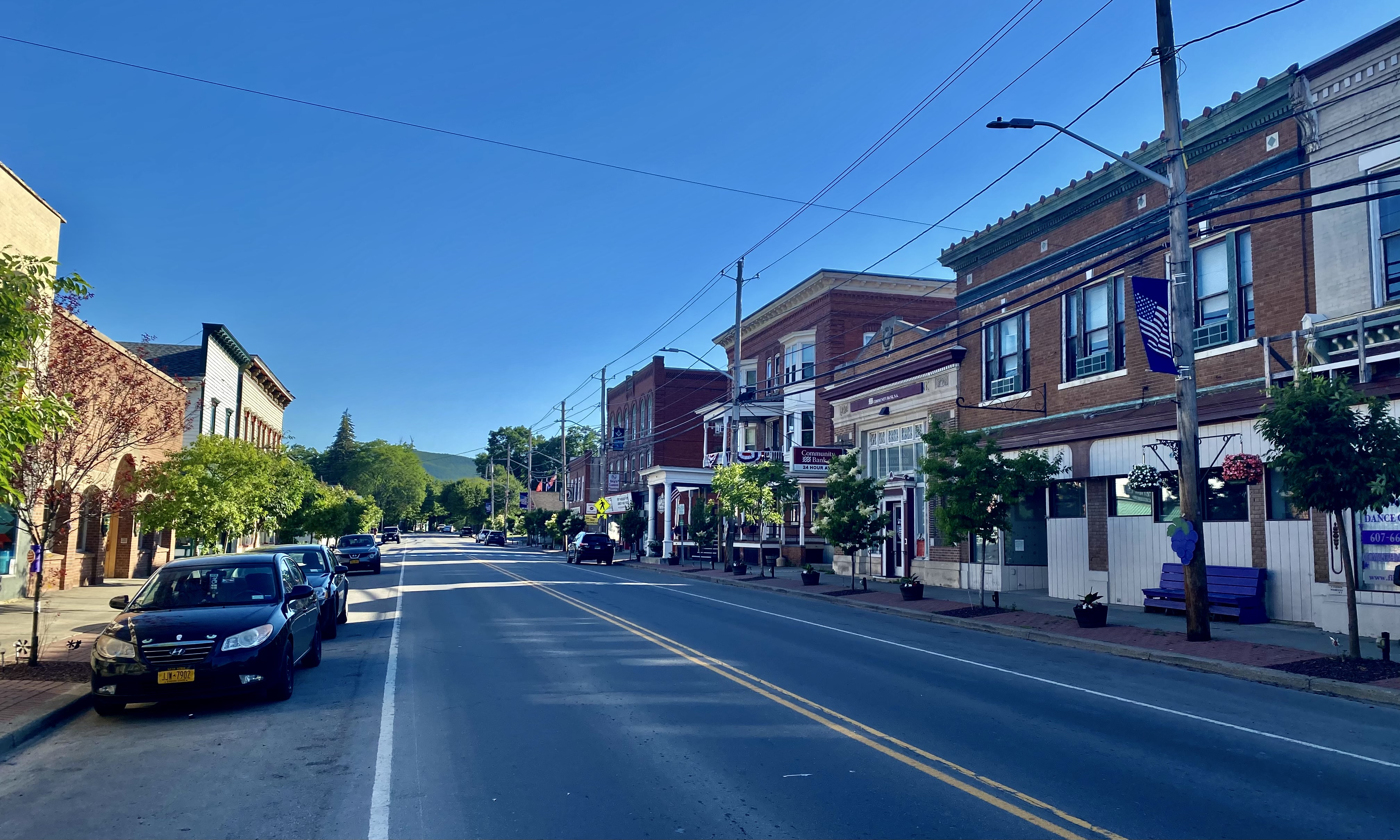
- South Main Street in the village center, as seen in June 2021

- Location within New York Location within the United States
- Coordinates: 42°36′58″N 77°24′9″W
- Country: United States
- State: New York
- County: Ontario

Government
  - Town Supervisor: Frank G. Duserick (D, R) Town Council: Gary Schenk (D, R); Robert Trischler (D, R); Kathleen S. Riesenberger (D, R); Mary F. Mueller (D, R)

Area
  - Total: 39.68 sq mi (102.78 km^{2})
  - Land: 39.68 sq mi (102.78 km^{2})
  - Water: 0 sq mi (0.00 km^{2})

Population (2020)
  - Total: 2,417 ▼
  - Estimate (2021): 2,405
  - Density: 62.4/sq mi (24.08/km^{2})
- Time zone: EST
  - Summer (DST): EDT
- FIPS code: 36-069-49440

Naples is a town in Ontario County, New York, United States. The population was 2,417 at the 2020 census.

The Town of Naples contains a village, also called Naples. The town is located in the southwestern corner of Ontario County. It is located in the Finger Lakes region of New York.

The annual Naples Grape Festival is held in September, and the area is known for its wineries and grape pie.

== History and other information ==
Naples was part of the Phelps and Gorham Purchase.

The town was established in 1789 along with Ontario County, on the old Native American village Nundawao, and settlement began the following year. The town was also part of the Underground Railroad, with old houses still having hiding spots to this day. The town, known in 1789 as "Watkinstown" (after Captains Nathan and William Watkins, Revolutionary War veterans and early settlers) and in 1796, they called the town "Middletown". And then, finally, the town was given the name "Naples" in 1808. Naples was not quickly settled due to its rough terrain. Part of the new town was used to form the Town of Italy in 1815, and another part was used to form part of the Town of Springwater in 1816.

Grapes, first planted in the 1860s, led to the modern grape and wine industry of the town and also led to the annual grape festival which began in 1961, one of which was broadcast on the World Food Network.

The village is home to St. Januarius Catholic Church, a unique architectural design by James Johnson. With the local grape industry as inspiration, much of the church was designed with grapes in mind.

The Widmer's Winery produces Manischewitz wine.

Naples Academy was founded in 1860. The main building of the current Academy was built during the New Deal program during the Great Depression by one of the public works programs set out by FDR. The school district currently serves grades Pre-K through 12, with grades Pre-K through 6 being in the Elementary School and grades 7 through 12 in the Jr/Sr High School across the street.

== Notable people ==
- Myron Holley Clark (1806-1892), New York governor and Prohibitionist.
- Meghan Musnicki (b. 1983), Olympic Athlete
- Lyman H. Smith (1918–1996), justice on the New York Supreme Court

== Geography ==
According to the United States Census Bureau, the town has a total area of 39.5 square miles (102.3 km^{2}), all land.

The very hilly land, once thought to be nearly worthless, was sold to the original settlers for twelve cents an acre (which is $3.88 in 2024 dollars).

The western town line is the border of Livingston County, and the southern town line is the border of Steuben County. The east town line is the border of Yates County.

New York State Route 21 and New York State Route 245 intersect at Naples village. New York State Route 53 is a north-south highway in the south part of Naples.

The town is southwest of Canandaigua Lake, one of the Finger Lakes. Naples Creek flows past the village to a lake known by locals as the Digger. Grimes Glen is a hiking trail near the Village of Naples. It features numerous waterfalls. Grimes Glen officially became a public park in 2008.

== Demographics ==
Historical population
Census	Pop.	Note	%±
1820	1,038		—
1830	1,943		87.2%
1840	2,345		20.7%
1850	2,376		1.3%
1860	2,067		−13.0%
1870	2,188		5.9%
1880	2,690		22.9%
1890	2,455		−8.7%
1900	2,370		−3.5%
1910	2,349		−0.9%
1920	2,122		−9.7%
1930	1,933		−8.9%
1940	1,972		2.0%
1950	1,906		−3.3%
1960	1,955		2.6%
1970	2,236		14.4%
1980	2,338		4.6%
1990	2,559		9.5%
2000	2,441		−4.6%
2010	2,502		2.5%
2020	2,417		−3.4%
2021 (est.)	2,405	▼	−0.5%
U.S. Decennial Census

As of the census of 2000, there were 2,441 people, 986 households, and 674 families residing in the town. The population density was 61.8 inhabitants per square mile (23.9/km^{2}). There were 1,112 housing units at an average density of 28.2 per square mile (10.9/km^{2}). The racial makeup of the town was 97.91% White, 0.25% Black or African American, 0.08% Native American, 0.49% Asian, 0.25% from other races, and 1.02% from two or more races. Hispanic or Latino of any race were 0.66% of the population.

There were 986 households, out of which 31.0% had children under the age of 18 living with them, 54.8% were married couples living together, 10.2% had a female householder with no husband present, and 31.6% were non-families. 26.0% of all households were made up of individuals, and 12.0% had someone living alone who was 65 years of age or older. The average household size was 2.46 and the average family size was 2.95.

In the town, the population was spread out, with 26.1% under the age of 18, 4.3% from 18 to 24, 27.6% from 25 to 44, 27.0% from 45 to 64, and 15.0% who were 65 years of age or older. The median age was 40 years. For every 100 females, there were 92.4 males. For every 100 females age 18 and over, there were 87.9 males.

The median income for a household in the town was $36,813, and the median income for a family was $42,566. Males had a median income of $34,508 versus $23,333 for females. The per capita income for the town was $17,944. About 8.9% of families and 10.5% of the population were below the poverty line, including 12.9% of those under age 18 and 14.2% of those age 65 or over.

== Communities and locations in the Town of Naples ==
- Garlinghouse – A hamlet in the west part of the town.
- High Tor Wildlife Management Area – A conservation area partly in the east of Naples.
- Hunt Hollow – A hamlet in the northwest corner of the town on County Road 36.
- Naples – The Village of Naples, on NY-21.
- Semans Corners – A hamlet in the northeast corner of the town, west of Woodville.
- Woodville – A hamlet at the northeast corner of the town at the foot of Canandaigua lake on NY-21.
