= Grape pie =

Fruit pie made from Concord grapes

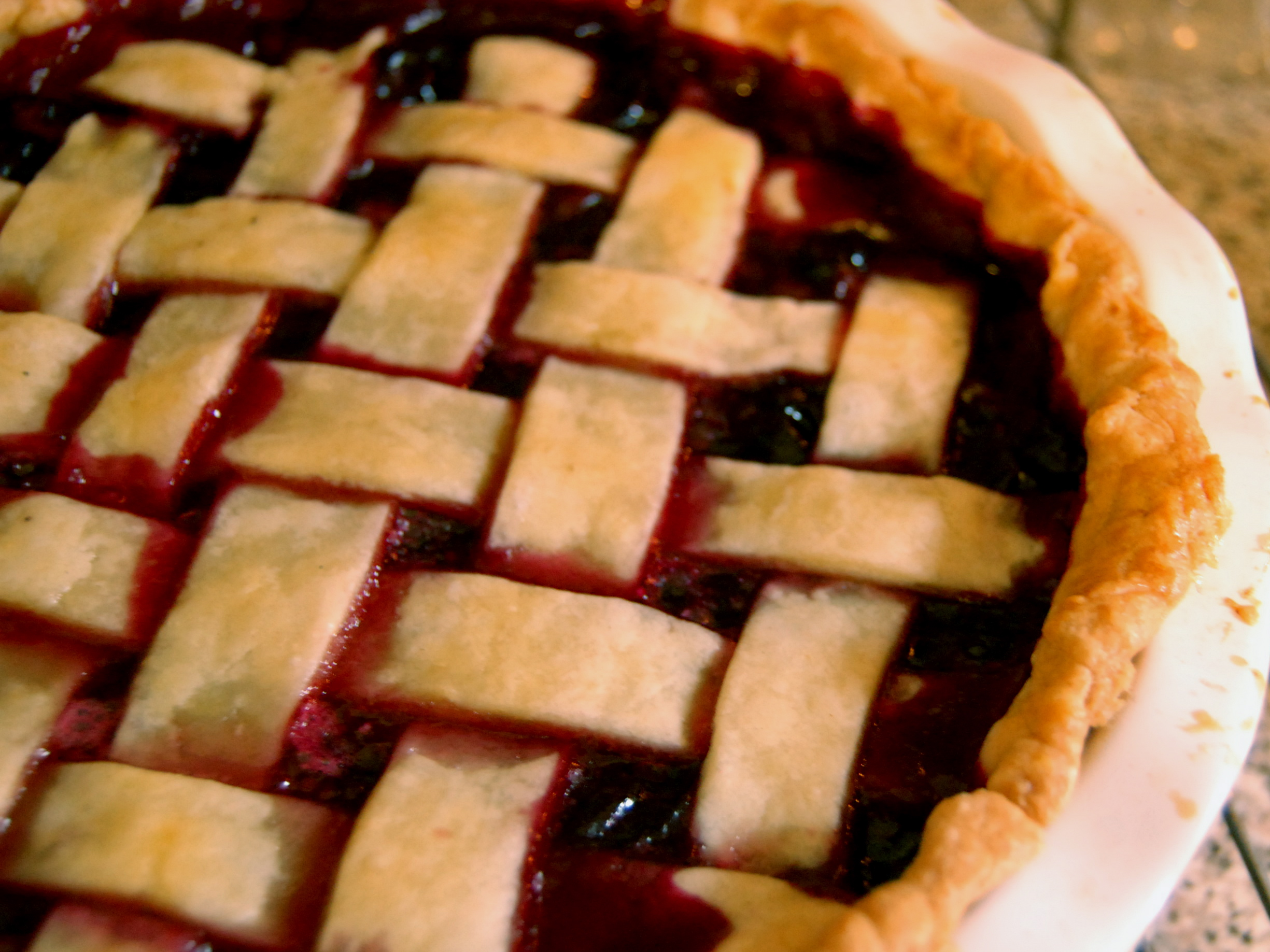
- A Concord grape pie
- Type: Pie
- Place of origin: Naples, New York
- Region or state: New York
- Main ingredients: Concord grapes

Grape pie is a type of fruit pie made from Concord grape and is part of harvest time traditions in the Finger Lakes region of New York in the United States. It is particularly sought after at the Naples Grape Festival, and the Geneva Grape Jamboree, and can be found at various shops around town.

== Concord grape pie ==
Grape pie made with Concord grapes is a regional specialty of Western New York, the Finger Lakes region, Pennsylvania and other areas of the United States where the grape is grown as well as Ontario, Canada. Vineyards that grow the grape, which was developed in the U.S., stretch from Western New York across Pennsylvania and into Ohio and Michigan as well as Washington state. Grape pie is a specialty and tradition of Naples, New York, host of the Naples Grape Festival and home to Angela Cannon-Crothers, author of Grape Pie Season.

The traditional recipe, using Concord grapes, is said to taste like wine due to the inclusion of tannins. Variants on the dessert use other grape types and various other ingredients. Concord grapes are structurally referred to as 'slip-skin' grapes, meaning the skin easily separates from the pulp during this labor-intensive preparation process required to make the pie filling.

The grape pie is part of the traditional cuisine of German immigrants to the region. This tradition is represented at Old Economy, home of a group of communal German immigrants founded in 1824. The pie-making is a "very long process" and includes "skinning the grape, cooking the pulp and separating out the seeds." Home baker Irene Bouchard, who became locally known as 'the grape pie lady,' historically expanded her seasonal production from 700 pies in 1964 to baking upwards of 300 pies per day during peak harvest seasons by 1980.

== Food chemistry research ==
Food chemistry research on Concord grape pomace—the skins and seeds left over during the pie-making process—shows that the fruit's total phenolic content and overall antioxidant capacity remain highly stable and do not easily degrade under elevated baking temperatures of 80 °C.

== See also ==
- List of grape dishes
