= Food Network South Beach Wine and Food Festival =

Food and drink festival in Miami, Florida

- Status: active
- Genre: festival
- Locations: Miami, Florida
- Country: United States
- Inaugurated: 1994

The Food Network South Beach Wine & Food Festival is an annual four-day event in Miami, typically in mid-February. The event showcases wine, spirits, chefs, and culinary personalities. The four-day event consists of dinners, wine seminars, tasting and demos, brunches and lunches, walk-around tastings, family events, fitness, and late-night parties. The event is hosted by Florida International University.

There was no festival in 2021.

== See also ==
- Boston wine festival
- Naples Grape Festival
- North Carolina Wine Festival
- San Diego Bay Wine & Food Festival
- Simply Wine Festival
- Tallahassee Wine and Food Festival
- Temecula Valley Balloon & Wine Festival
