= Naples Memorial Town Hall =

- U.S. National Register of Historic Places
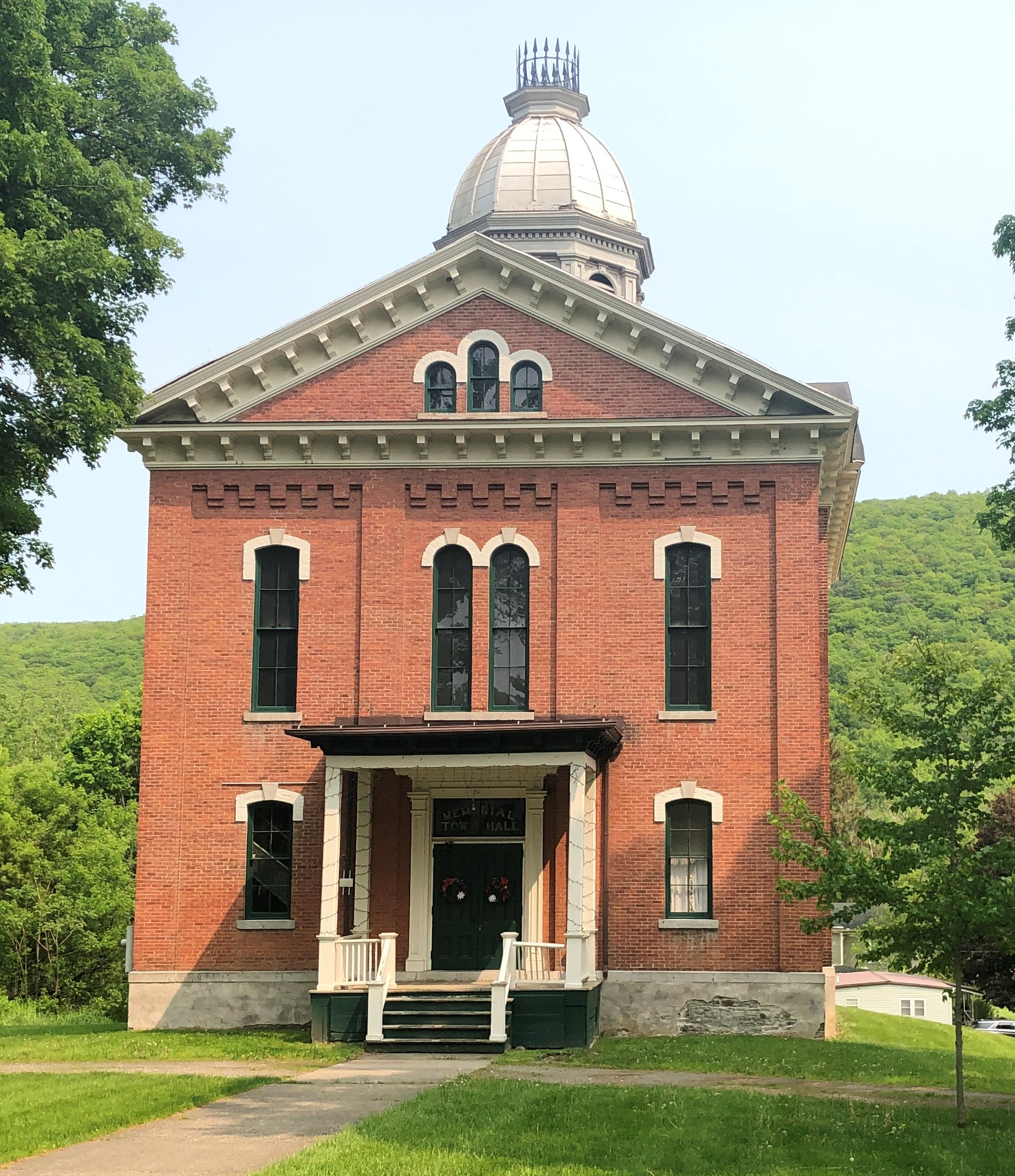
- Naples Memorial Town Hall, May 2023

- Location within New York Location within the United States
- Location: N. Main St., NE corner of jct. of N. Main and Monier Sts., Naples, New York
- Coordinates: 42°37′2″N 77°24′2″W
- Area: 2.2 acres (0.89 ha)
- Built: 1870-72
- Built by: E. W. Buck; Seymour H. Sutton
- Architect: A. J. Warner & Company
- Architectural style: Italianate
- NRHP reference No.: 96000482
- Added to NRHP: May 13, 1996

Naples Memorial Town Hall is a historic town hall located at Naples in Ontario County, New York. It was built in 1870–72 and is a lavish and imposing, two story rectangular brick building in the Italianate style. It was designed by A. J. Warner & Company, the Rochester partnership of A. J. Warner and Charles Coots. The town hall served as the center of the village and town's social and recreational activities until World War II. Between 1942 and 1972, the building was in private hands and served a variety of commercial and light industrial uses. In 1972, it was reacquired by the town and serves as a community center and host site for the annual Naples Grape Festival.

It was listed on the National Register of Historic Places in 1996.

== Gallery ==
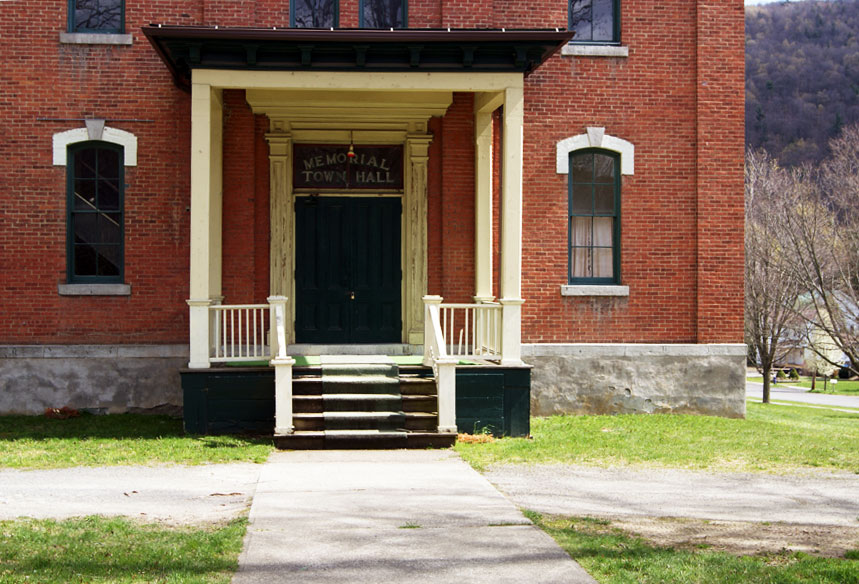
Entrance detail, Memorial Town Hall in Naples, NY, April 2012
