= Morgan Hook and Ladder Company =

- U.S. National Register of Historic Places
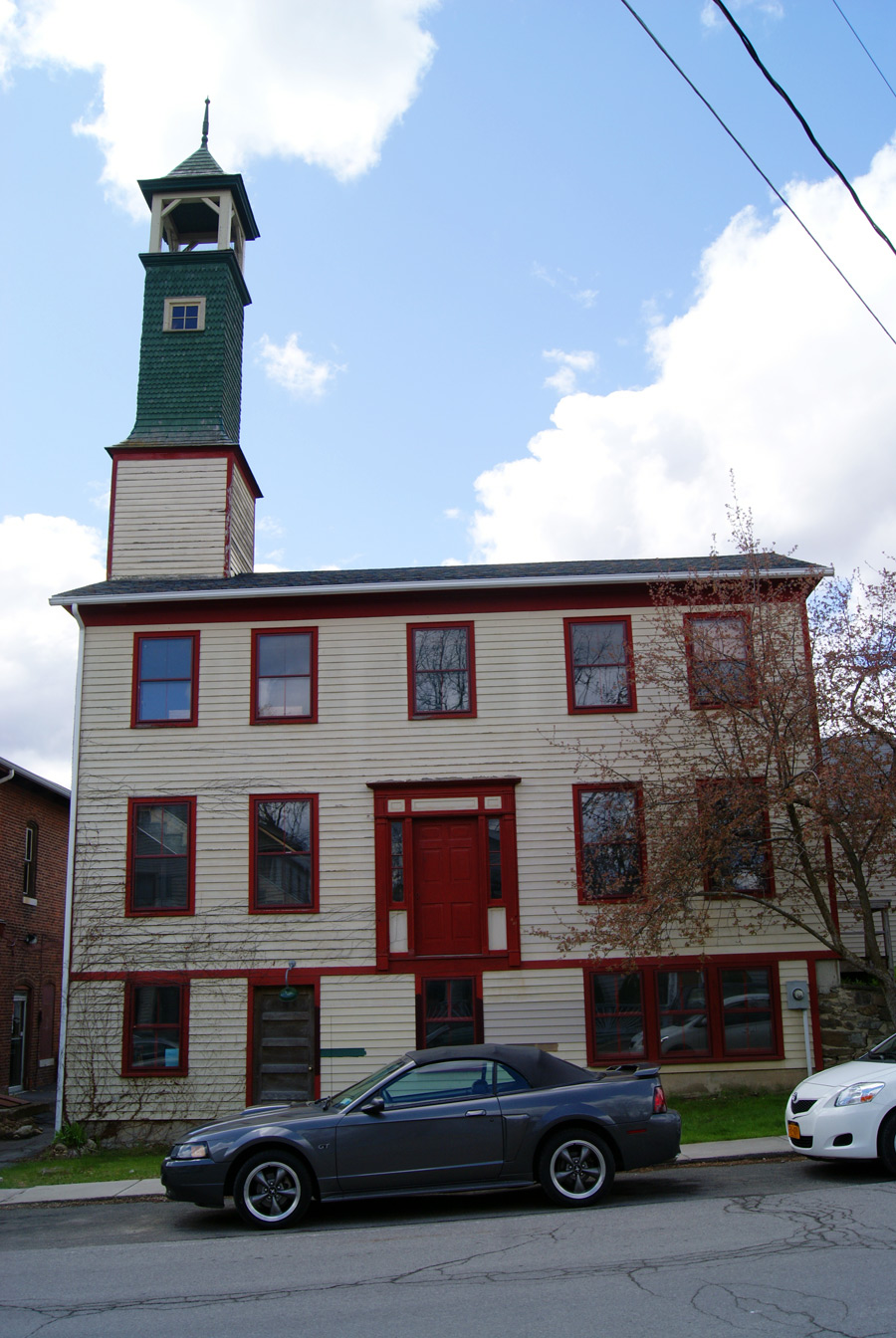
- Morgan Hook and Ladder Company building, April 2012

- Location within New York Location within the United States
- Location: 18-20 Mill St., Naples, New York
- Coordinates: 42°36′55″N 77°24′13″W
- Area: less than one acre
- Built: 1830
- Architectural style: Federal, Late Victorian
- NRHP reference No.: 95000668
- Added to NRHP: June 02, 1995

Morgan Hook and Ladder Company is a historic fire station located at Naples in Ontario County, New York. The original part of the two story, frame structure was built about 1830 as a Federal style dwelling and later expanded and converted to a fire station in 1891 or 1892. It features a prominent hose drying / bell tower. It ceased being used as a fire station in 1926.

It was listed on the National Register of Historic Places in 1995.
