= Ephraim Cleveland House =

Historic house in New York, United States

- U.S. National Register of Historic Places
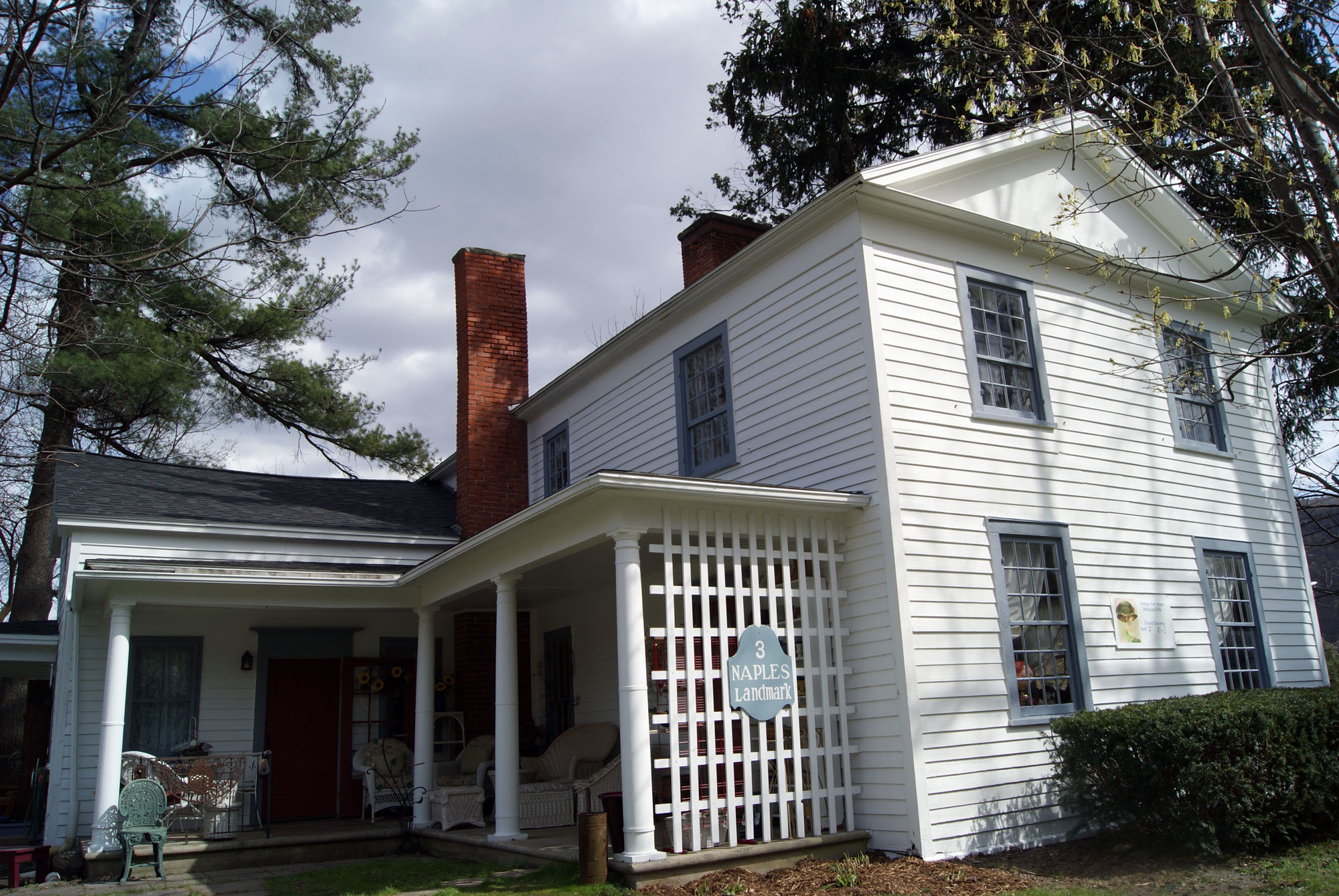
- Ephraim Cleveland House

- Location within New York Location within the United States
- Location: 201 N. Main St., Naples, New York
- Coordinates: 42°37′34″N 77°23′41″W
- Area: less than one acre
- Architectural style: Federal, Vernacular Federal
- NRHP reference No.: 94000047
- Added to NRHP: February 18, 1994

Ephraim Cleveland House is an American historic home in the town of Naples in Ontario County, New York. It was built in the vernacular Federal style around 1794, and was expanded in the 1840s and '50s. It is a two-story, five-bay dwelling, and possesses a distinctive Federal-style entrance, featuring a paneled door with half sidelights and a blind elliptical fanlight.

It has been listed on the National Register of Historic Places since 1994.

== Gallery ==
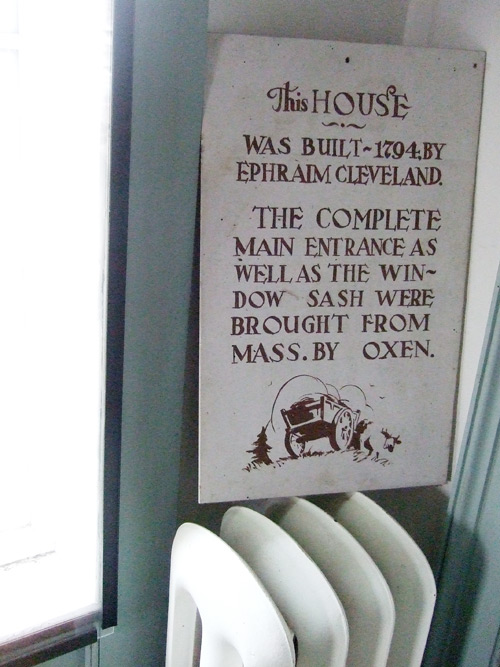
Ephraim Cleveland descriptive sign
