= Tallahassee Wine and Food Festival =

Coordinates: 30.438509°N 84.290119°W

Logo of the Tallahassee Wine and Food Festival

The Tallahassee Wine and Food Festival is an annual two-day charitable event held in November in Tallahassee, Florida, United States which began in 1995.

This festival was held virtually in 2020.

== Non-profit affiliations ==
The TWFF benefits the March of Dimes to improve the health of babies by preventing birth defects, preterm birth, and infant mortality.

== Events within the larger event ==
The TWFF as a whole is a combination of several smaller events which include: A wine dinner reception, wine dinner, celebrity chef, VIP reception at wine tasting, festival shoppe, wine auction, silent auction, press and media party, golf tournament, and meélange market.

== Sponsors ==
The TWFF is sponsored at-large by insurance companies in the categories of diamond, platinum, gold, silver and bronze. Each of the festival's separate events shown above are sponsored by local businesses.

Media sponsors include some of Tallahassee's print media such as the Tallahassee Democrat, Tallahassee Magazine as well as broadcast media such as Comcast and Clear Channel Communications.

== See also ==
- Boston wine festival
- Food Network South Beach Wine and Food Festival
- San Diego Bay Wine & Food Festival
- Naples Grape Festival
