= Lyman H. Smith =

American judge (1918–1996)

Associate Justice, New York Supreme Court
- In office September 25, 1973 – March 9, 1983

County, Family, and Surrogate Courts Judge, Yates County, New York
- In office 1964–1973

Personal details
- Born: Lyman Herbert Smith Jr. January 10, 1918 Naples, New York, U.S.
- Died: November 3, 1996 (aged 78) Dundee, New York, U.S.
- Resting place: Fulkerson Cemetery, Dundee, New York
- Profession: Lawyer

Lyman Herbert Smith Jr. (January 10, 1918 – November 3, 1996) was an American attorney and justice of the New York Supreme Court. He was a County, Family, and Surrogate Courts judge in Yates County, New York from 1964 to 1973. Before that, he was a country attorney for Yates County from 1948 to 1964.

== Early life ==
Lyman Herbert Smith Jr. was born in a log cabin in Naples, New York on January 10, 1918. His parents were Cora Mae (née Dailey) and Lyman H. Smith Sr., a rural mail carrier. He graduated from Naples High School. Next, he attended Cornell University, graduating with a Bachelor of Arts in 1940 and a Bachelor of Letters in 1942. While there, he was a member of Alpha Chi Rho fraternity.

During World War II, he served as a first lieutenant and a company tank commander with the United States Army 9th Armored Division. He saw action during the Battle of the Bulge and the recapture of Remagen Bridge, receiving a Bronze Star for the latter.

== Career ==
Smith started a private law practice in Penn Yan, New York in 1946. He was elected county attorney in 1948, serving until 1964 when he became a judge with the county, Family, and Surrogate Courts in Yates County. He was a judge in Yates County for fifteen years. In June 1968, he was approved to practice before the Supreme Court of the United States.

Governor Nelson Rockefeller appointed Smith to serve as a judge on the Seventh Judicial District New York Supreme Court on September 25, 1973. This position which ran until December 21, 1974, was created to support new anti-drug laws. When his appointed term was up, Smith successfully ran for election to the New York Supreme Court and served for fourteen years. One of his noted cases was a special grand jury investigation into political corruption in Onondaga County. He retired on March 9, 1983, after serving 38 years in law.

Smith taught at the New York State School for the Judiciary (now the New York State Judicial Institute) in Crotonville, New York. He also chaired the Committee on Criminal Jury Instructions. He was a member of the American Bar Association, the National Prosecutors' Association, the New York State Bar Association, the New York State District Attorney's Association.

== Personal life ==
Smith first married Catherine Strong. Their children were Patricia D. Smith, Scott C. Smith, Catherine B. Smith, and Dion C. Smith. His second wife was Mary Elizabeth "Polly" Marks. They lived in Glenora, New York.

Smith was a golfer, sailor, and vineyardist. He was a vestryman at St. Mark's Episcopal Church in Penn Yan. He was president of the Penn Yan Rotary Club, the Yates County Red Cross, and the Yates County Community Chest. He was a Republican.

Smith died on November 3, 1996, in Dundee, New York. He was buried in the Fulkerson Cemetery in Dundee.
