= Rowes Wharf =

Building in Massachusetts, United States

Coordinates: 42°21′22.29″N 71°02′59.36″W

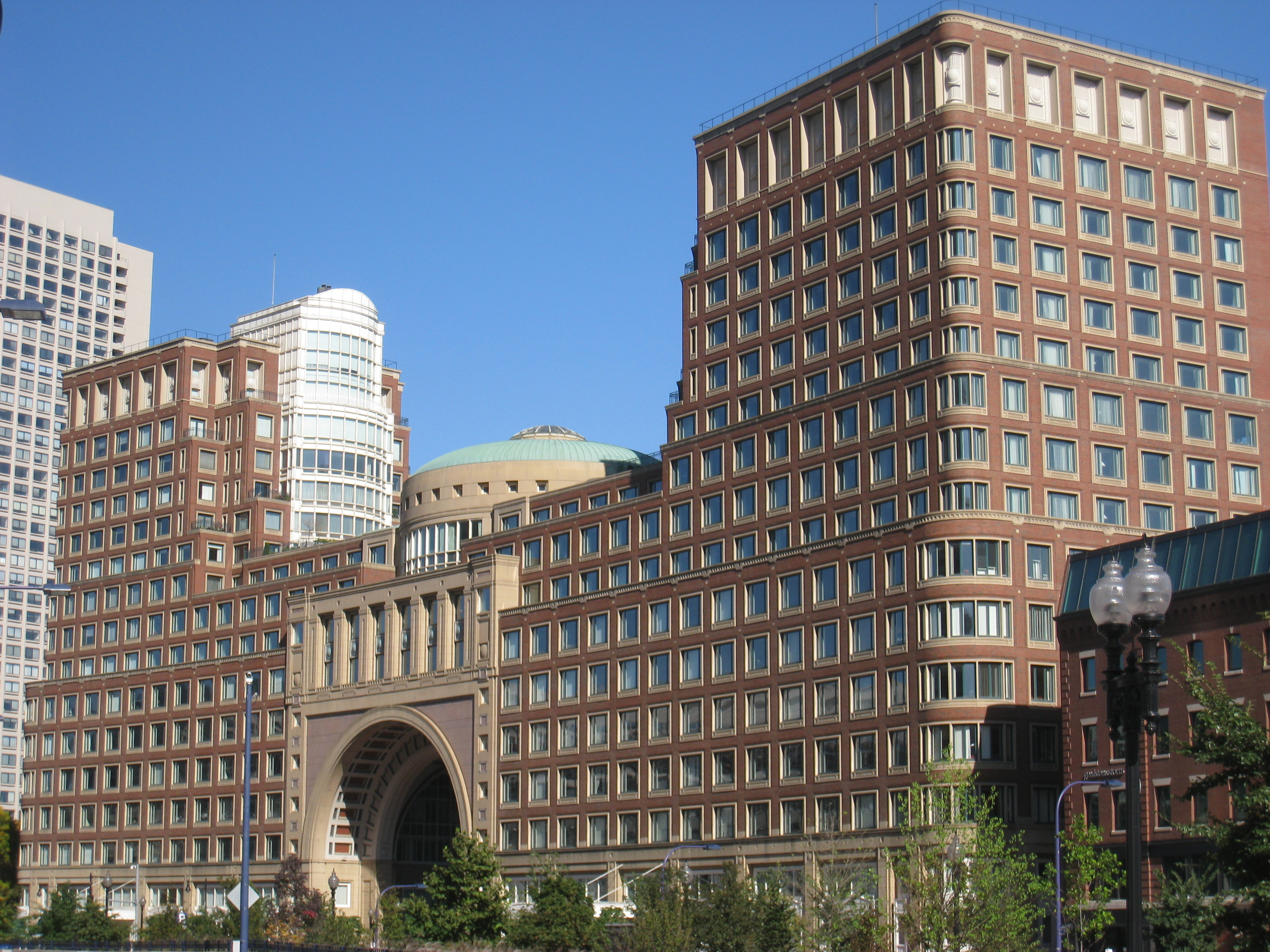
Rowes Wharf, Boston, 2008 (looking across the Rose Fitzgerald Kennedy Greenway)

The current incarnation of Rowes Wharf (built 1987) is a modern development in downtown Boston, Massachusetts. It is best known for the Boston Harbor Hotel's multi-story arch over the wide public plaza between Atlantic Avenue and the Boston Harbor waterfront. Along the waterfront can be found a marina, restaurants, a water transportation terminal, and a floating stage offering free concerts and movies during the summer.

MBTA ferry service links the wharf to Hingham, while water taxis operate to and from Logan International Airport. Cruise boats also operate from the wharf.

== History ==
=== 18th century ===
In 1666 a protective battery called the "Sconce", or the "South Battery", was built at the foot of Fort Hill in the area now known as Rowes Wharf. In peacetime, the Battery had a company assigned to it in case of invasion, but had only one gunner. During the 1740s, the Battery was extended into the harbor and was defended by thirty-five guns. In 1764, John Rowe bought the land and built the first Rowes Wharf, which extended a short distance into Boston Harbor, and in 1765 Foster's Wharf was built on the site of the old Battery. His wife, Hannah Rowe, inherited the property upon his death in 1787 and continued to grow the family business.

Foster's Wharf was originally called "Apthorp's Wharf". Charles Ward Apthorp was a staunch Tory and backed the losing side in the American Revolution; it was his confiscated land and wharf that merchant William Foster bought for 6,266 pounds, 12 shillings in May 1782. Rowes Wharf, however, has carried its original builder's name since its inception. For the next 150 years or so, commercial shipping continued to be a main user of the area.

=== 19th-20th century ===
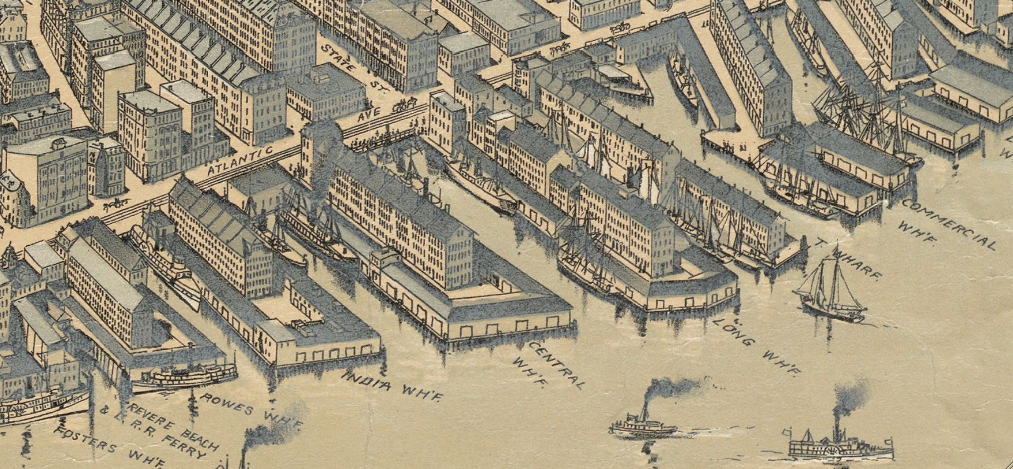
Detail of 1899 map of Boston, showing Rowes Wharf

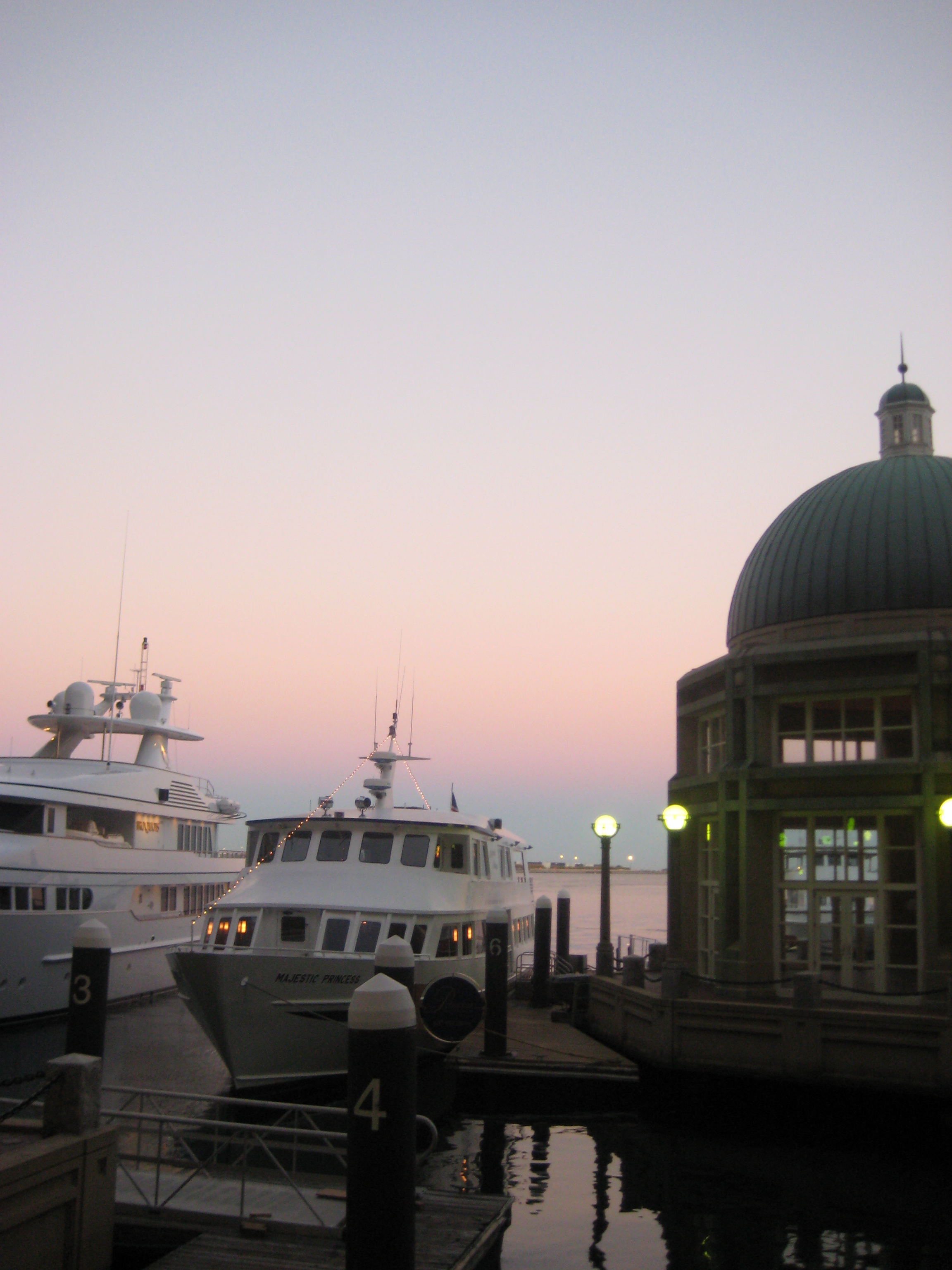
Yachts moored at Rowes Wharf, 2007

With the opening of the Boston, Revere Beach and Lynn Railroad in 1875, a ferry connection was established from Rowes Wharf to the railroad's southern terminus in East Boston. With the construction of the Atlantic Avenue Elevated in 1901, a station at Rowes Wharf connected the wharf to Boston's elevated and subway rail system. However, by the middle of the 20th century, both the railroad - and by October 1938, the elevated railway - had closed, and the wharf had become dilapidated, the victim of changing patterns in shipping. This remained the case until the 1980s, when the current development was constructed.

The Boston Harbor Hotel is the principal occupant of the current Rowes Wharf building, which was completed in 1987, and designed by Adrian Smith while he was working for Skidmore, Owings and Merrill (SOM).

== See also ==
- John Rowe (merchant)
