= Yehuda Matzos =

Israeli matzo company

Yehuda Matzos Moshe Ludmir & Sons Ltd.
- Native name: מצות יהודה משה לודמיר ובניו בע"מ
- Industry: Food manufacturing
- Founded: 1921; 105 years ago
- Founders: Ludmir family
- Headquarters: Jerusalem, Israel

Yehuda Matzos Moshe Ludmir & Sons Ltd. (Hebrew: מצות יהודה משה לודמיר ובניו בע"מ), or simply Yehuda Matzos (Hebrew: מצות יהודה, romanized: Matzot Yehuda), is a large Israeli matzo company based in Jerusalem which is a large local matzo company and leading exporter to the United States, Canada, and other countries.

== History ==
The factory was founded in 1921, by the Ludmir family from Safed, with the support of local rabbis who called for the purchase of matzah in order to support the Safed factory that provided a livelihood for the residents of the area.

In 1949, they moved to Jerusalem and moved with them to the factory where it still sits today in the industrial area of Givat Shaul. During the year the factory produces matzah, matzah flour, cookies and biscuits. For Passover, the factory produces reserved matzahs (under the Jerusalem Matzah brand), regular matzahs, rich matzahs and other kosher products for Passover.

The plant is under the supervision of the Chief Rabbinate of Jerusalem and the Haredi community and the products comply with the international standards ISO 9001 and HACCP. Some of their matzo (which is labeled as such) is kosher for passover and supervised by the Chief Rabbinate of Jerusalem. Yehuda Matzo offers gluten-free matzo. The company also produces matzo, matzo flour, cookies, and biscuits, year-round.

In 2019, Yehuda had become the leading Israeli matzah brand sold in the United States and was also the top-selling brand in the five-pound box category.

== See also ==
- Streit's
- Manischewitz
