= Boston Harbor Hotel =

Luxury hotel in Boston, Massachusetts

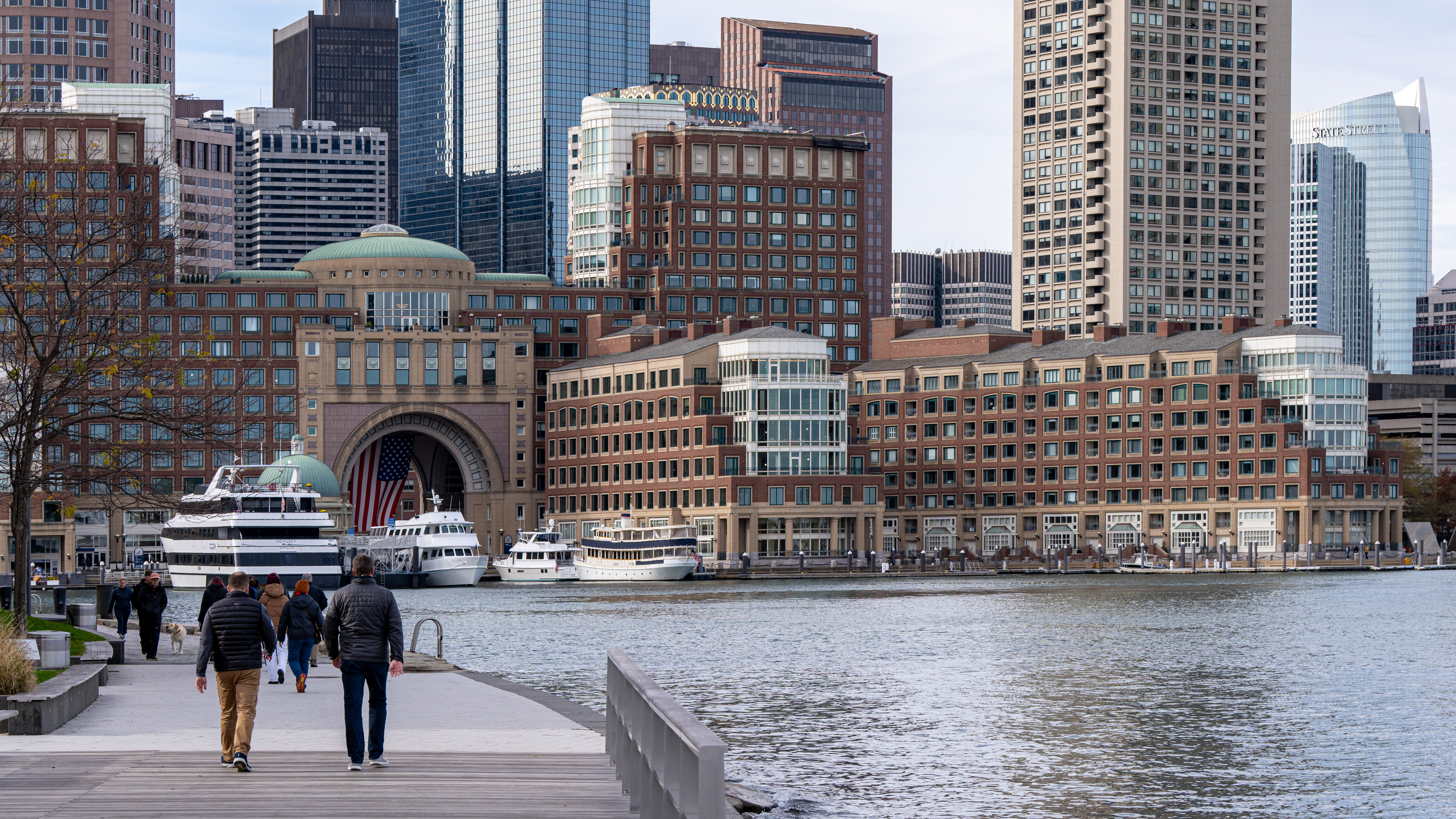
- The Boston Harbor Hotel and Rowes Wharf

- Location within Massachusetts

General information
- Location: 70 Rowes Wharf, Boston, Massachusetts, U.S.
- Coordinates: 42.3569°N 71.0502°W
- Owner: Morgan Stanley
- Operator: HHM Hotels

Other information
- Number of rooms: 232
- Number of suites: 26
- Number of restaurants: 2

Website
- bhh.com

The Boston Harbor Hotel is a luxury hotel overlooking Boston Harbor and the Rose Kennedy Greenway. A member of Preferred Hotels & Resorts Worldwide, the hotel is owned by Morgan Stanley.

The hotel is the principal occupant of the Rowes Wharf building, completed in 1987, and designed by Adrian Smith while he was working for Skidmore, Owings and Merrill (SOM). The building is an example of postmodernist architecture.

It has been operated by HHM Hotels since 2025.
