= Bartenura wine =

Royal Wine Company

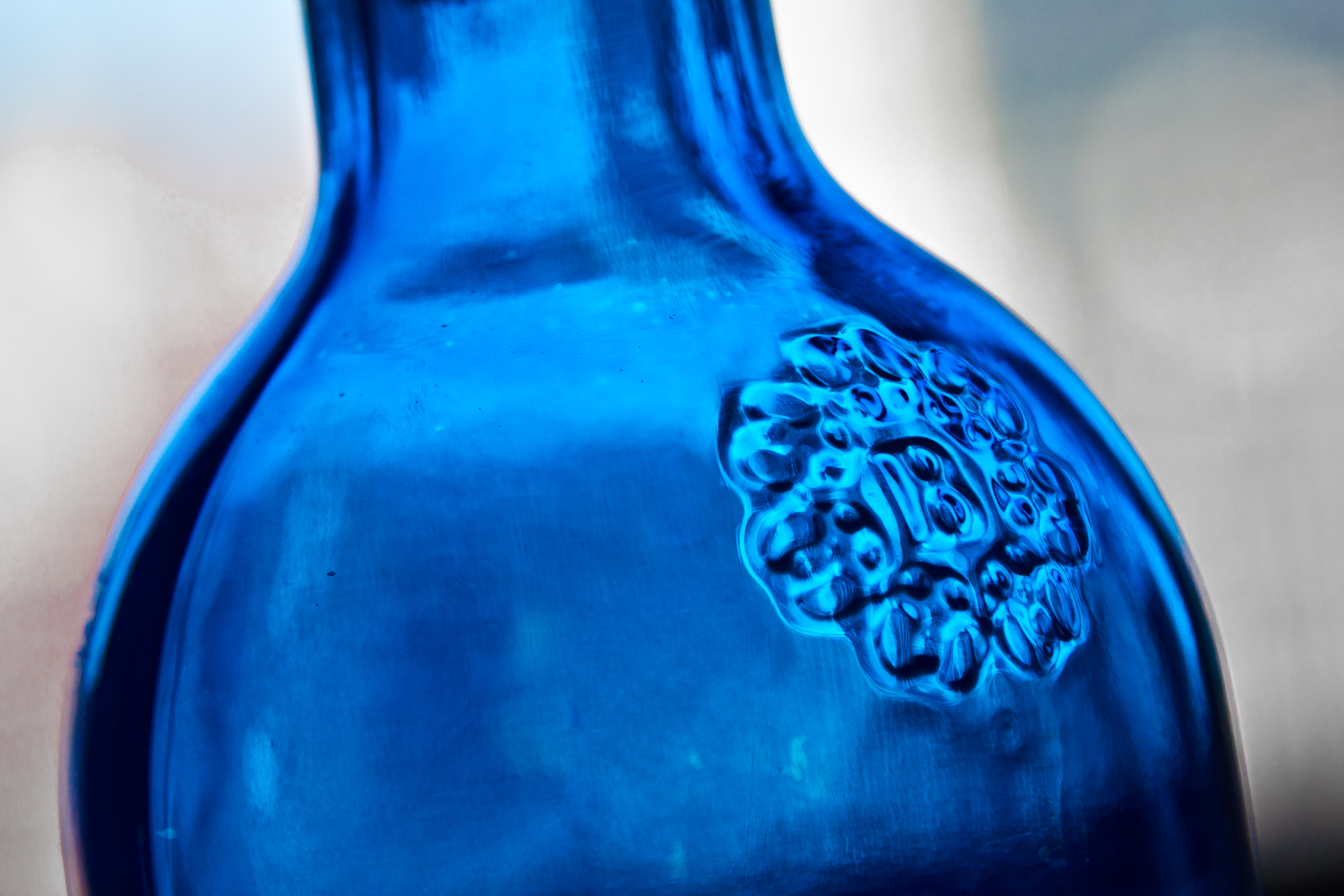
The B emblem on a Bartenura Moscato wine bottle

Bartenura is an international brand of the Royal Wine Company, a kosher wine manufacturer. The wine is sourced from the province of Pavia, Italy, and is named for Rabbi Ovadia ben Avraham of Bertinoro (known as The Bartenura), the 15th century Italian rabbi.

This wine was the first to sell in a blue glass bottle. In 1992, it became the largest-selling wine in the kosher sector, and is the single most successful kosher Italian wine brand. It is exported to 32 countries.

The Moscato of Bartenura was mentioned by Lil’ Kim in a song in 2005, which generated popularity among other singers. In May 2020, it became the second kosher wine to be made available in a can. The first being Rosé by J.Folk in 2020.

== Awards and recognition ==
Bartenura wine was featured in the 2018 Vivino's Wine Style Awards.

The wine was featured at the Vinexpo in Hong Kong in 2018.
