= San Diego Bay Wine & Food Festival =

The San Diego Bay Wine & Food Festival is an international showcase of wine and spirits, chefs and culinary personalities, and gourmet foods, held annually in San Diego, California. It is produced by World of Wine Events, LLC. Attendees are able to take cooking classes, sample food from celebrity chefs and local restaurants, and participate in wine tastings from various wineries, breweries and spirit booths. The festival takes place in November and has been held annually since 2004.

== History ==
The San Diego Bay Wine & Food Festival was created in 2004 by co-producers Ken Loyst and Michelle Metter. Proceeds from the auctions benefit the American Institute of Wine & Food Culinary Arts Scholarship programs for students in San Diego.

COVID-19 pandemic restrictions required 2020's 17th annual festival to be deferred to 2021.
