= Hashachar Ha'ole =

Israeli chocolate spread

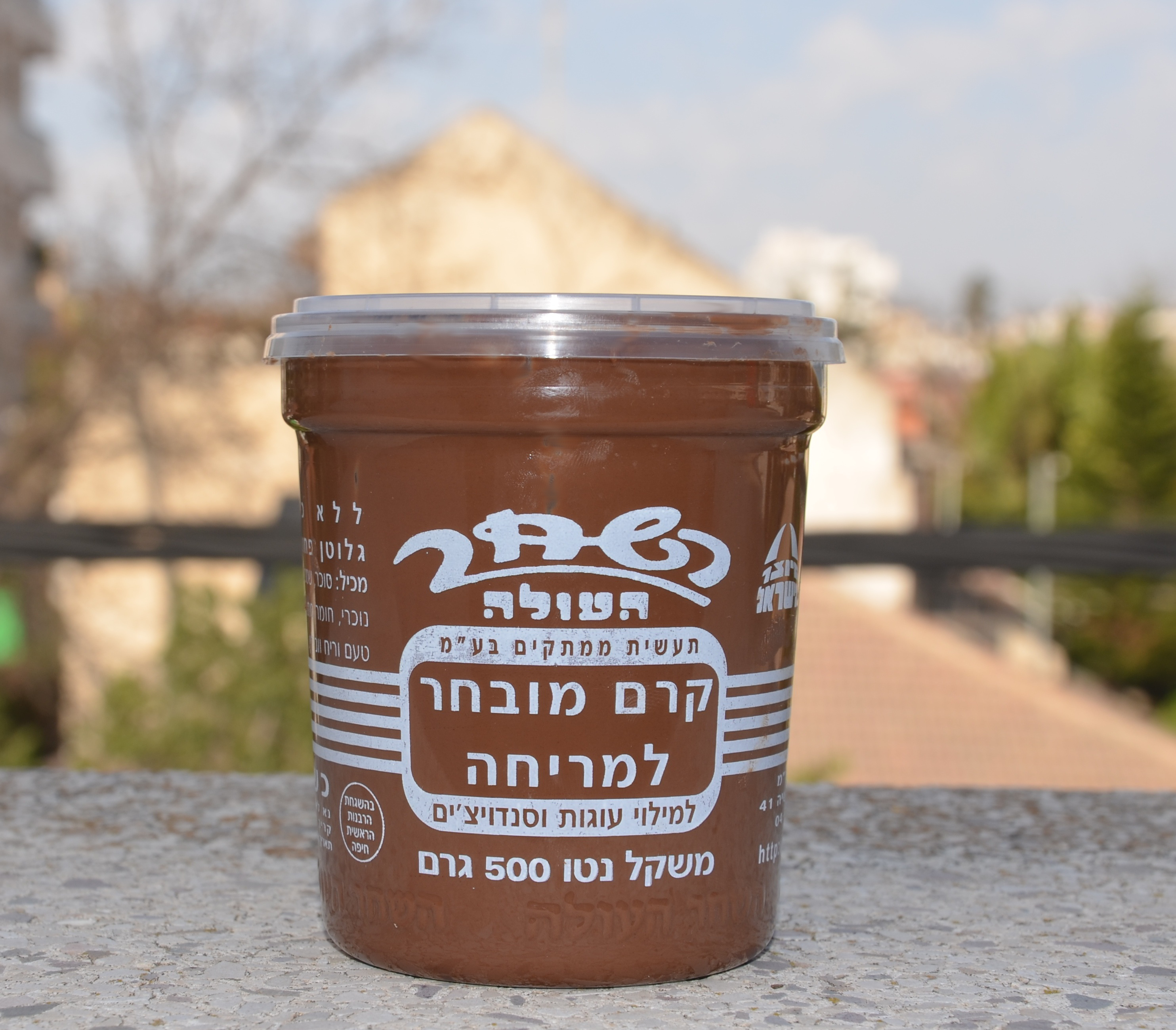
- Type: Spread
- Place of origin: Israel
- Region or state: Haifa
- Created by: Weidberg family
- Main ingredients: Sugar, palm oil, cocoa powder, milk powder (not in pareve version)
- Variations: Pareve (non-dairy/vegan version), dark chocolate, white chocolate, nougat, halva

Hashachar Ha'ole (Hebrew: השחר העולה; "The Rising Dawn") is a brand of sweetened cocoa-flavoured spread popular in Israel and the Jewish diaspora, and was invented in 1948.

== Etymology ==
The name Hashachar Ha'ole translates to "The Rising Dawn" or alternatively "The Bright Morning" in Hebrew, in reference to it mainly being used in the morning and spread on something such as on toast, pita, or bread such as challah, or malawach for breakfast.

== History ==
In 1948, 5 brothers, who were all members of the Weidberg family, started a small factory manufacturing chocolate and other confectionery products including their eponymous chocolate spread, in 1948 outside the city of Haifa. In 1950 Levkowich family joined the company. Seeing a need for a new product in the Israeli market, Hashachar Ha’ole stopped producing their other products to exclusively focus the production of its chocolate spread in 1955, which was 9 years before the similar Italian product Nutella was launched in 1964; possibly making Hashachar the world's first chocolate spread.

== Overview ==
Hashachar Ha'ole has become one of Israel’s best-known foods. It is even called the most successful chocolate spread in Israel and has become a symbol of Israeli cuisine. There are two different versions of it: halavi (dairy) and parve (non-dairy). This is because Jewish law prohibits mixing milk with meat-based foods, thus the parve version allows kosher-observers to include the spread in dessert after a meat-based meal. For many years, Hashachar Ha'ole was the only chocolate cream available on the Israeli market. Nowadays you can also find brands like Elite and Nutella. Until the 2010s Hashachar had never been advertised in the mass media. Its original logo has been retained and remained the same since its launch in 1948.

== Varieties ==
Hashachar Ha'ole is available in a number of flavors including milk chocolate, pareve chocolate, dark chocolate, white chocolate, nougat, halva, chocolate halva, and milk chocolate mixed with tehina among others. It is sold in tubs, individual cups, and tubes. It is also available as a chocolate bar.

== See also ==
- Babka
- Cow Chocolate
- Krembo
- Klik
- Nutella
