= Babka =

Eastern European sweet yeast viennoiserie cake or bread

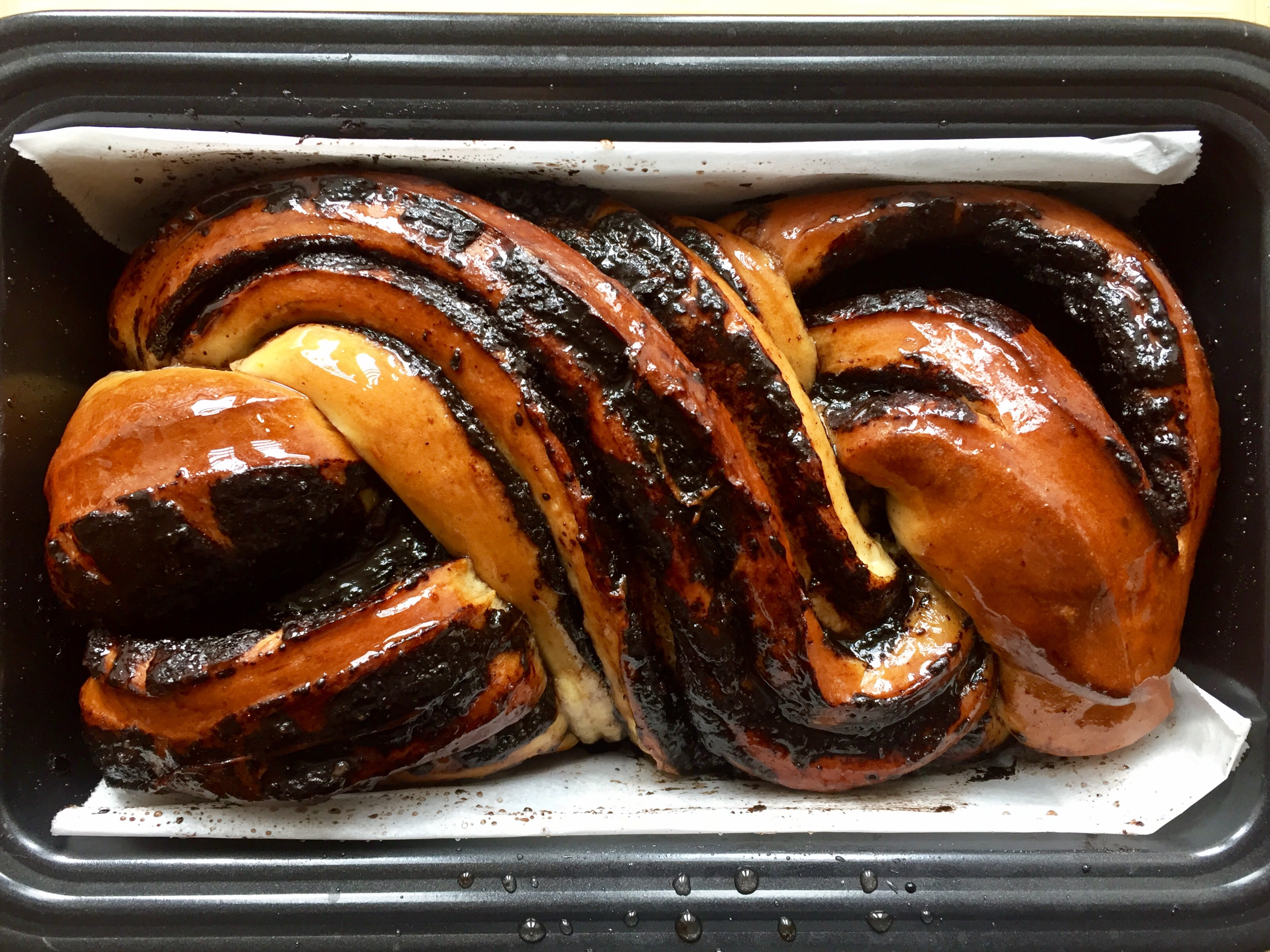
- Chocolate babka
- Alternative names: Ugat Shmarim
- Type: Viennoiserie
- Place of origin: Jewish communities of Poland and western Ukraine
- Variations: Chocolate babka, cinnamon babka, sweet cheese babka

Babka is a sweet braided cake or viennoiserie that originated in the Jewish communities of Poland and Western Ukraine. It is prepared with a yeast-leavened dough that is rolled out and spread with a filling, then rolled up and braided before baking. Traditionally fillings included jam or nuts, though now include chocolate, cinnamon, fruit, or cheese. It can be made with butter, or to remain pareve it can be made with olive oil.

It is popular in Jewish communities worldwide, where it is also known as yeast cake or Ugat Shmarim (עוגת שמרים).

The cake is also the forerunner of the French baba au rhum (and Neapolitan babbà) via Polish king Stanisław Leszczyński's exile in Wissembourg, Lorraine, France, in the 18th century.

== History ==
Babka was developed in the early 19th century by the Jewish communities of Poland and Central and Eastern Europe. Extra challah dough was rolled up with fruit jam or cinnamon and baked as a loaf alongside the challah. Chocolate was not originally used, as it was not generally available; the chocolate babka was likely a mid-20th century American development. To be pareve, traditional recipes used olive oil instead of butter.

Its name (though not necessarily the dish itself) may be related to a type of Easter cake popular in Poland and Ukraine known as baba or the diminutive babka, which means "grandmother".

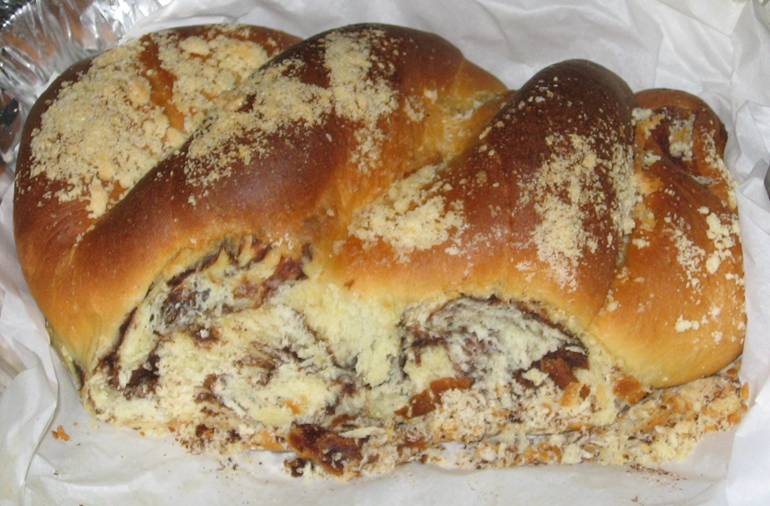
A chocolate babka made with a dough similar to challah, and topped with streusel, a late addition to babka tradition

Although the Polish and Ukrainian babka are mutually synonymous with their Jewish counterparts, the appearance and preparation of each babka is drastically different. The Eastern European babka is known for its tall, stout, fluted sides formed in a traditional pan, and reminiscent of a grandma's skirt. In comparison, the variant introduced by émigrés to New York consists of strands of rich yeasted dough interwoven and baked in a loaf tin.

The Jewish babka was mostly unheard-of outside the Polish Jewish community until the latter part of the 20th century. European-style bakeries started to offer it in the late 1950s in Israel and the United States. In addition to chocolate, various fillings including poppy seeds, almond paste, cheese, and others became popular, and some bakers began to top it with streusel. In the 21st century it has found more popularity with non-Jewish communities.

== Preparation ==
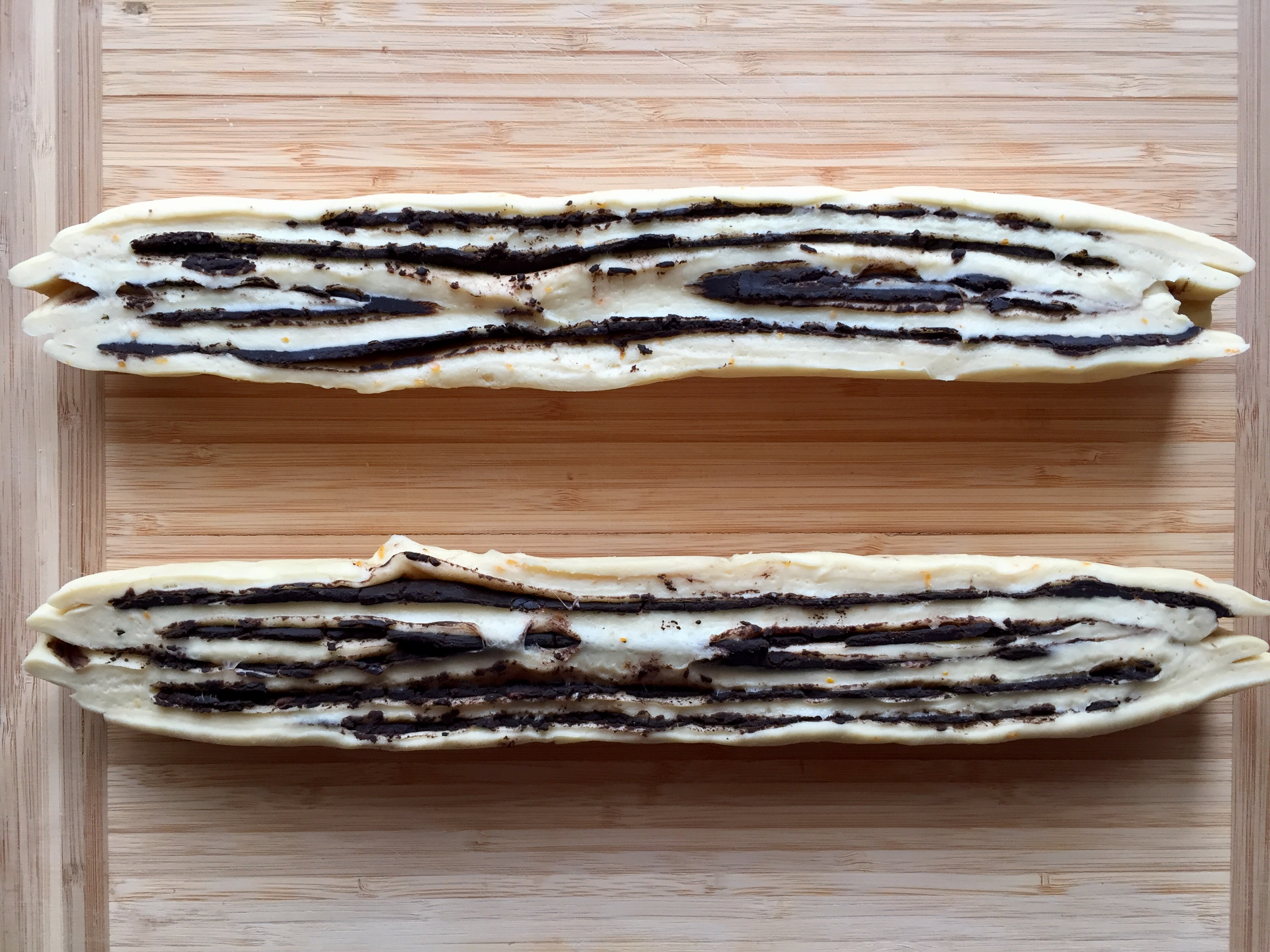

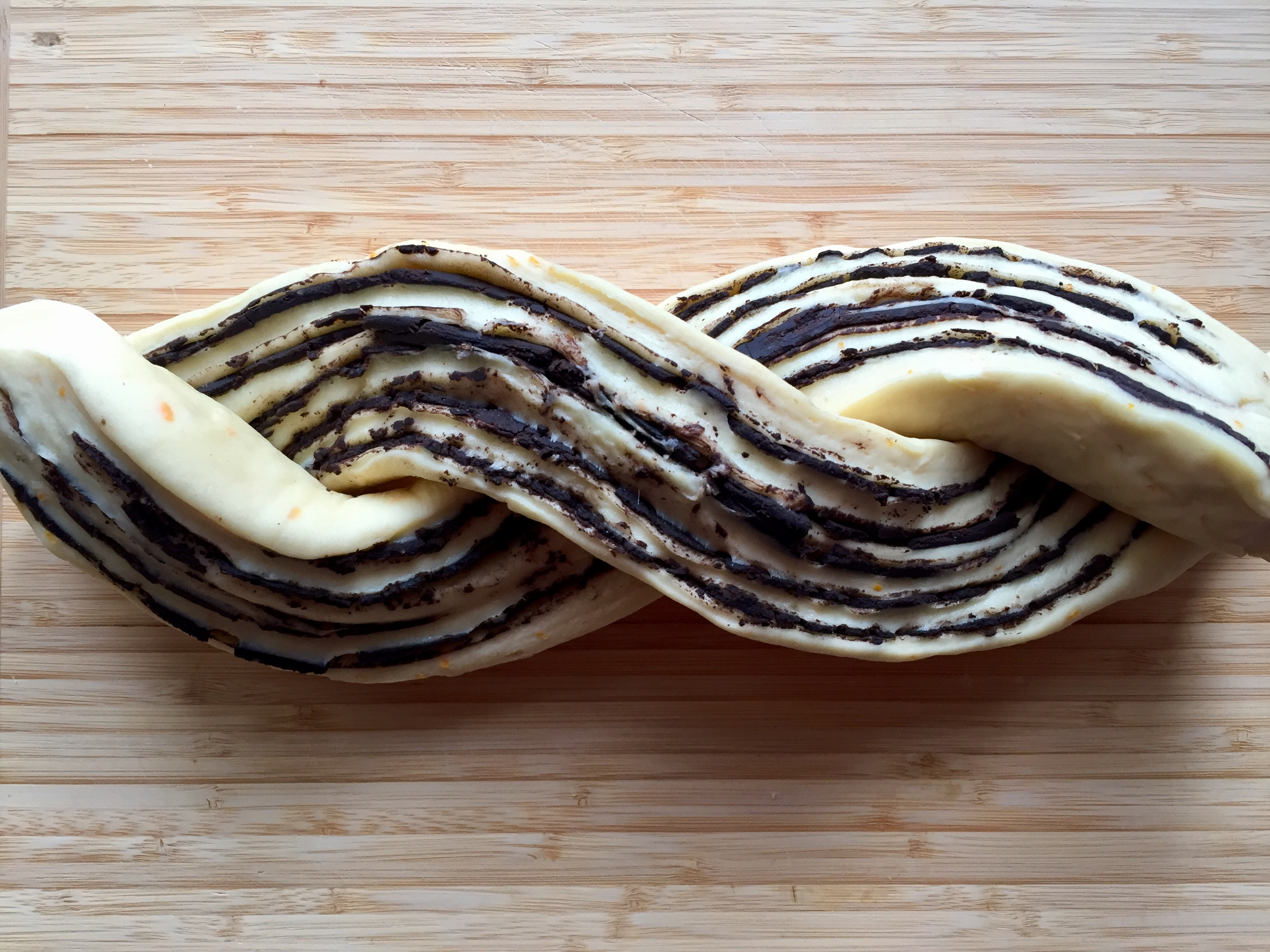
Babka dough is rolled, split into halves and then braided to create the layers of bread and fillings.

It consists of either an enriched dough, similar to challah, or a laminated dough, similar to croissants. The dough is then rolled out and spread with a variety of sweet fillings such as chocolate, cinnamon sugar, apples, sweet cheese, mohn, or raisins, which is then braided either as an open or closed plait and topped with a sugar syrup to preserve freshness and make the bread more moist. It is sometimes topped with a streusel topping.

=== Variations ===
Israeli style babka (עוגת שמרים) is made with a wider array of fillings. The most popular fillings are chocolate, which is commonly paired with Hashachar Ha'ole, mohn, and sweet cheese typically made with gvina levana. It is typically sweet; however, savory versions are also popular, often containing labneh and za'atar. It is also often baked into individual pastries shaped to resemble roses.

Potato babka (babka ziemniaczana), created after potatoes became a staple in the 19th century, is the most famous dish in the Polish region of Podlachia, and is widely popular in both Poland and Belarus.

== In popular culture ==
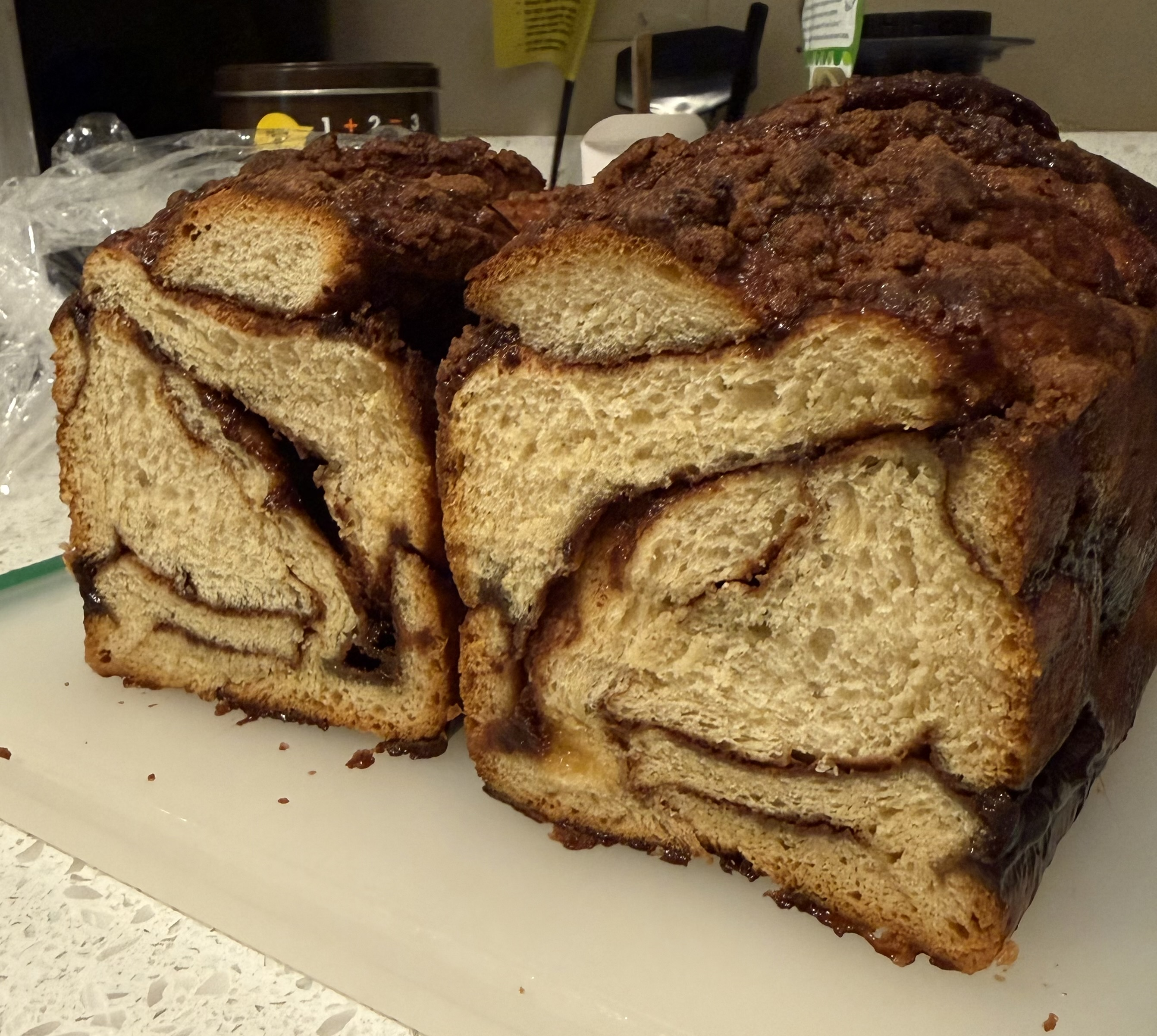
Cinnamon babka

The Seinfeld episode "The Dinner Party" references both chocolate and cinnamon babka extensively, with the character Elaine Benes expressing dismay over cinnamon's status as "the lesser babka," to which Jerry Seinfeld exclaims "cinnamon takes a backseat to no babka!". The scene is often referred to by food critics when talking about babka, especially quoting Elaine's "you can't beat a babka".

Baker Shimi Aaron was called "the future babka king" by Bill Addison of The Los Angeles Times in 2020. Aaron's innovations included adding orange peel and rose petals, and bringing his Egyptian, Iraqi and Yemeni heritage to his recipes for savory babkas.

== See also ==
- Jewish cuisine
- Polish cuisine
