= Kutach =

Ancient Babylonian food

- Alternative names: Kutach HaBavli
- Type: Condiment
- Region or state: Babylonia

Kutach is a dairy-based dip that was commonly eaten with bread in Ancient Babylonian cuisine.

== History ==
Kutach is mentioned in a variety of Jewish sources.

The Mishnah mentions it in Pesachim 3:1, as an example of chametz.

The Mishneh Torah mentions it in a few discussions, as an example of chametz and as an example of dairy in discussions regarding the prohibition of eating meat with milk.

The Shulchan Aruch also mentions it in a discussion regarding the prohibition of eating meat with milk as an example of dairy

== See also ==
- Fermented milk products
- Kashk
