= Margarine =

Semi-solid oily spread often used as a butter substitute

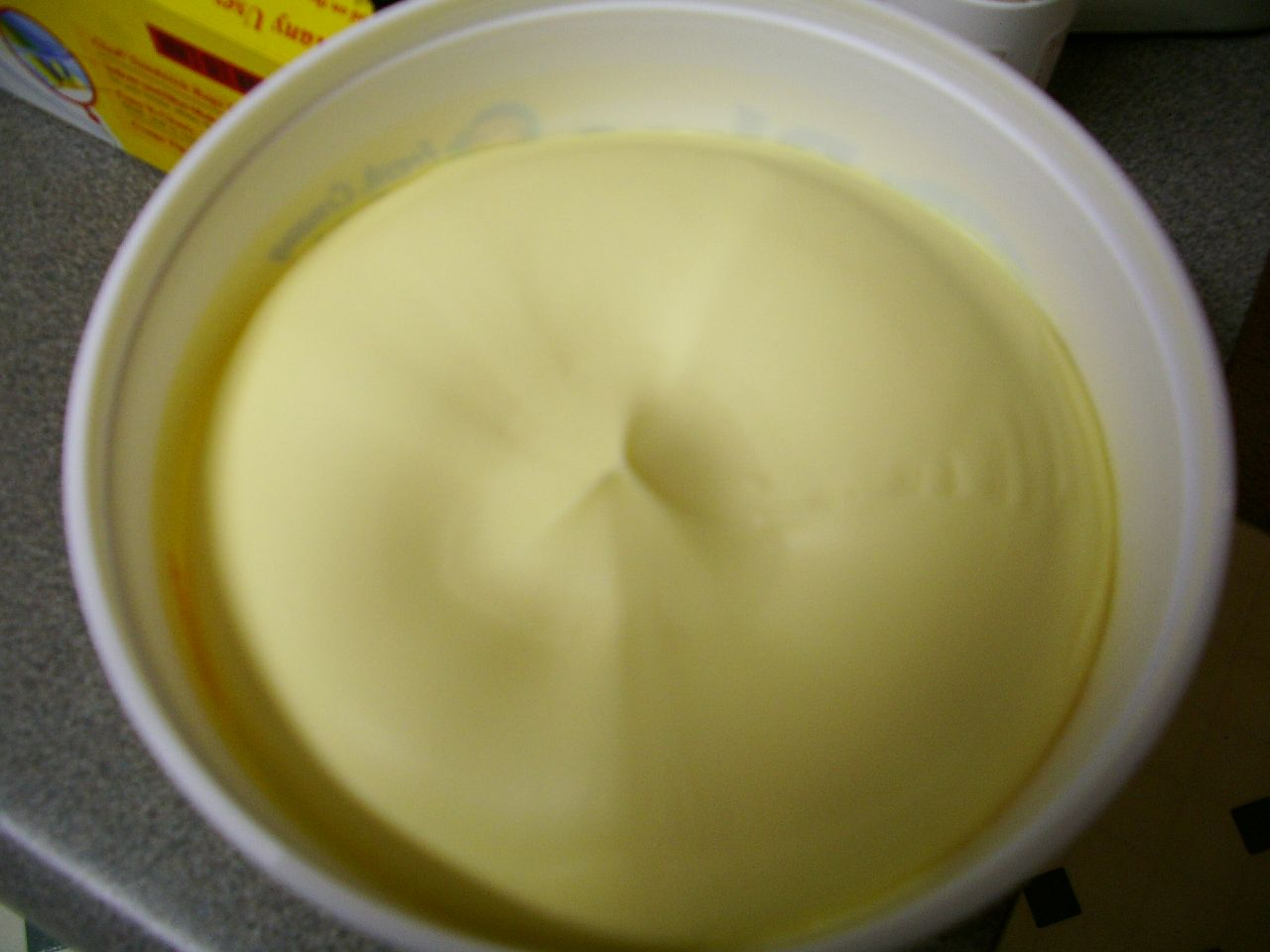
- Margarine in a tub
- Alternative names: Marge, oleo, oleomargarine, buttery spread
- Type: Spread
- Place of origin: France
- Created by: Hippolyte Mège-Mouriès
- Main ingredients: Vegetable oils

Margarine (Note: /ˈmɑːrdʒəriːn/, also UK: /ˈmɑːrɡə-, ˌmɑːrɡəˈriːn, ˌmɑːrdʒə-/, US: /ˈmɑːrdʒərɪn/) is a spread used for flavoring, baking, and cooking. It is most often used as a substitute for butter. Although originally made from animal fats, most margarine consumed today is made from vegetable oil. The spread was originally named oleomargarine from the Latin oleum ("olive oil") and Greek margarite ("pearl", indicating luster). The name was later shortened to margarine, or sometimes oleo (particularly in the Deep South region of the United States).

Margarine consists of a water-in-fat emulsion, with tiny droplets of water dispersed uniformly throughout a fat phase in a stable solid form. While butter is made by concentrating the butterfat of milk through centrifugation, modern margarine is made through a more intensive processing of refined vegetable oil and water.

Margarine can be used as an ingredient in other food products, such as pastries, doughnuts, cakes, biscuits and cookies.

== History ==
=== Invention and early distribution ===
External audio
- “Butter vs. Margarine”, Distillations Podcast, Science History Institute

French chemist Michel Eugène Chevreul in 1813 discovered margaric acid. Scientists at the time regarded margaric acid, like oleic acid and stearic acid, as one of the three fatty acids that, in combination, form most animal fats. In 1853, the German structural chemist Wilhelm Heinrich Heintz analyzed margaric acid as simply a combination of stearic acid and the previously unknown palmitic acid.

After the French Emperor Napoleon III issued a challenge to create a butter-substitute from beef tallow for the armed forces and lower classes, Hippolyte Mège-Mouriès invented margarine in 1869. Mège-Mouriès patented the product, which he named "oleomargarine", and expanded his initial manufacturing operation from France, but had little commercial success. In 1871, he sold the patent to the Dutch company Jurgens, which subsequently became part of Unilever. In the same year a German pharmacist, Benedict Klein from Cologne, founded the first margarine factory in Germany, producing the brands Overstolz and Botteram.

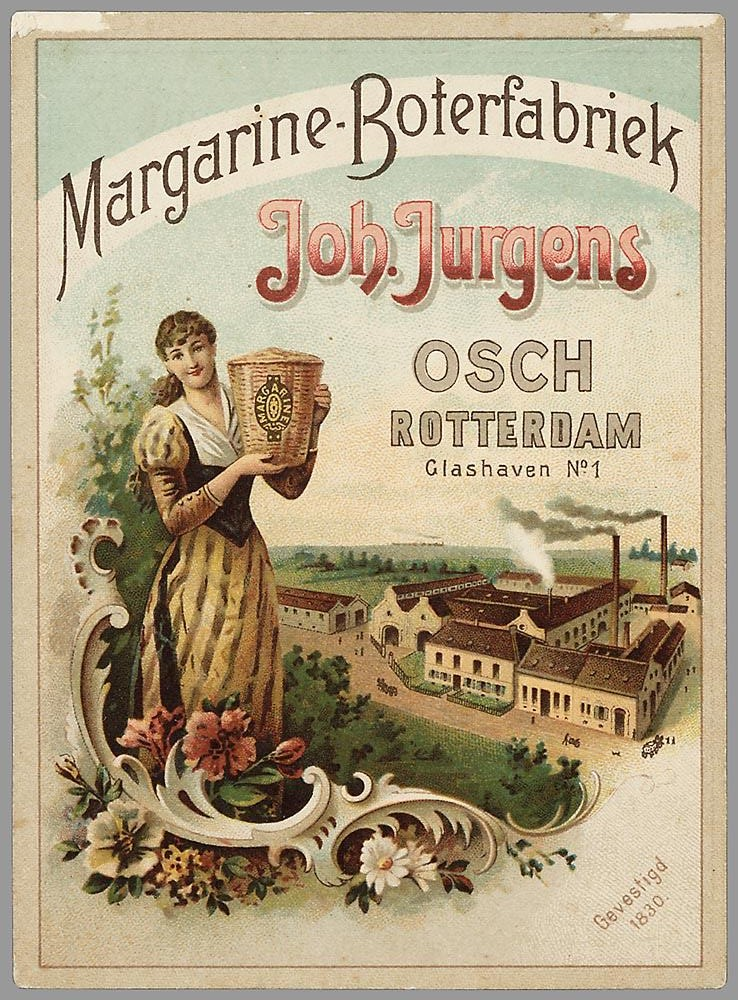
Dutch margarine advertising, 1893

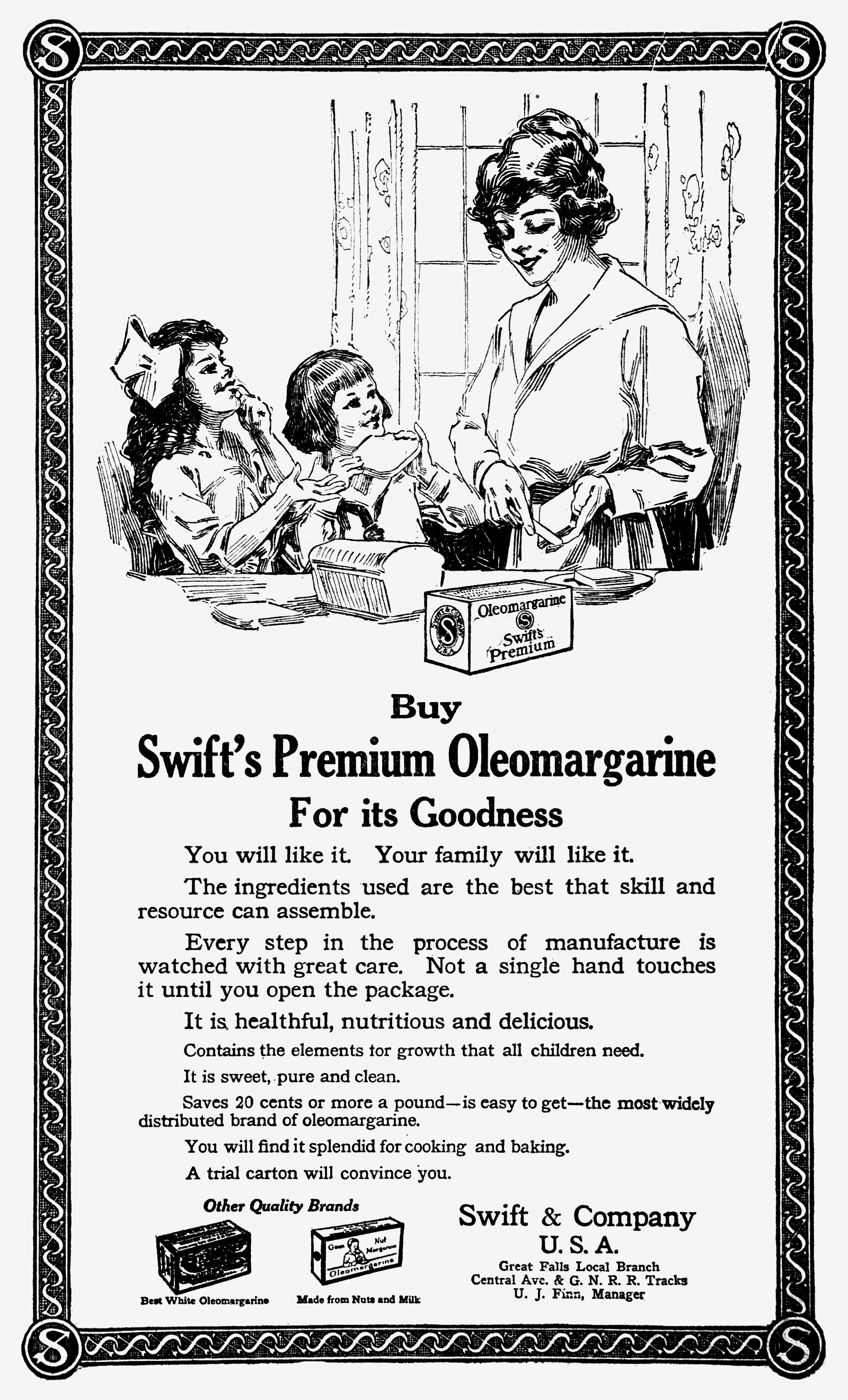
Newspaper ad for an American oleomargarine product, 1919. Product made by the American company Swift & Company from by-products of the animal processing business.

The principal raw material in the original formulation of margarine was beef fat. In 1871, Henry W. Bradley of Binghamton, New York, received US Patent 110626 for a process of creating margarine that combined vegetable oils (primarily cottonseed oil) with animal fats. In 1874, the first commercial cargo arrived in the UK. By the late-19th century, some 37 companies were manufacturing margarine in the US, in opposition to the butter industry, which protested and lobbied for government intervention, eventually leading to the 1886 Margarine Act imposing prohibitive taxes and fees against margarine manufacturers.

Shortages in beef fat supply, combined with advances by James F. Boyce and Paul Sabatier in the hydrogenation of plant materials, soon accelerated the use of Bradley's method, and between 1900 and 1920, commercial oleomargarine was produced from a combination of animal fats and hardened and unhardened vegetable oils. The Great Depression, followed by rationing in the United States and in the United Kingdom, among other countries, during World War II, led to a reduction in supply of animal fat and butter, and, by 1945, "original" margarine had almost completely disappeared from the market. In the United States, problems with supply, coupled with changes in legislation, caused margarine manufacturers to switch almost completely to vegetable oils and fats by 1950, spurring new product development.

=== Color debate ===
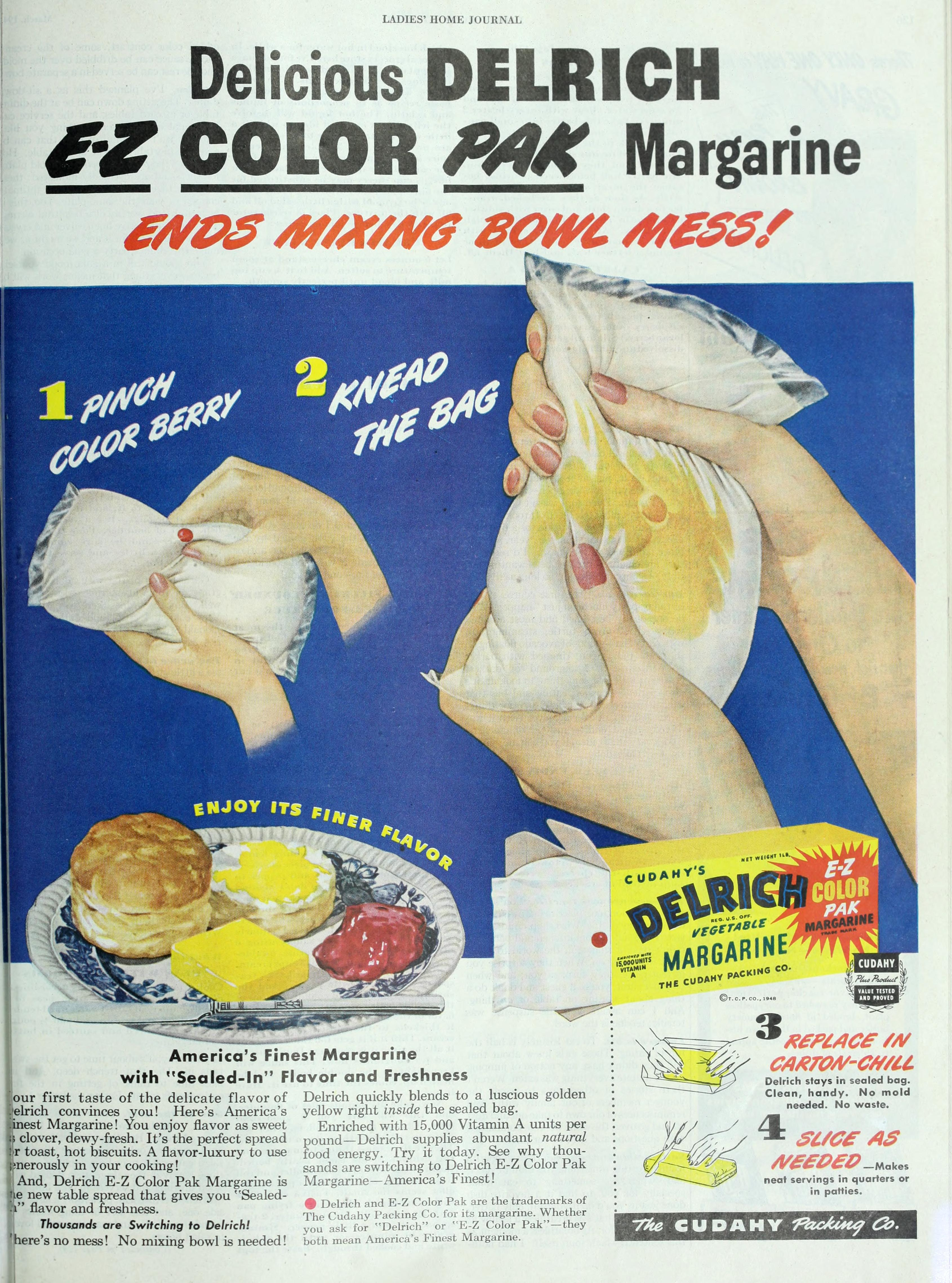
A 1948 advertisement for margarine with instructions for mixing the color inside a sealed bag.

Carotene in the milk of grass-fed cows gives butter produced from such milk a slightly yellow color. However, being a synthetic product, margarine has a white color resembling lard, which many people found unappetizing. Around the late 1880s, manufacturers began coloring margarine yellow to improve sales.

Dairy firms, especially in Wisconsin, became alarmed at the potential threat to their business, and succeeded in getting legislation passed to prohibit the coloring of the stark white margarine by 1902. In response, margarine companies distributed margarine together with a packet of yellow food coloring. The product was placed in a bowl and the coloring mixed in manually, taking some time and effort, especially if the mixing needed to be done by hand—typically the case at the time since domestic electric mixers were rarely used before the 1920s. It was therefore not unusual for the final product to be served as a light and dark yellow, or even white, striped product. During World War II, butter and margarine were both in short supply and subject to rationing in the United States, but butter required more points, causing margarine to gain popularity. In 1951, the W. E. Dennison Company received US Patent 2553513 for a method to place a capsule of yellow dye inside a plastic package of margarine. After purchase, the capsule was broken by pressing on the outside of the package, and the package was kneaded to distribute the dye.

The artificial coloring laws began being repealed around 1955, and margarine could once again be sold colored like butter in most states. The final hold out was Wisconsin, which finally repealed its restrictions in 1967.

=== Coal butter ===
Around the 1930s and 1940s, Arthur Imhausen developed and implemented an industrial process in Germany for producing edible fats by oxidizing synthetic paraffin wax made from coal. The products were fractionally distilled and the edible fats were obtained from the C_{9}–C_{16} fraction which were reacted with glycerol such as that synthesized from propylene. Margarine made from them was found to be nutritious and of agreeable taste, and it was incorporated into diets contributing as much as 700 calories per day. The process required at least 60 kilograms of coal per kilogram of synthetic butter. That industrial process was discontinued after WWII due to its inefficiency.

=== Post-WWII ===
During the Second World War and immediate post-war years amid rationing in the United Kingdom, only two types of margarine were available: a premium brand and a budget brand with whale oil being used in its manufacture. With the end of rationing in 1955, the market was opened to the forces of supply and demand, and brand marketing became prevalent. The competition among the major producers was given further impetus with the beginning of commercial television advertising in 1955 and, throughout the 1950s and 1960s, competing companies vied to produce the margarine that tasted most like butter.

=== Spread products ===
In the mid-1960s, the introduction of two lower-fat blends of butter oil and vegetable oils in Scandinavia, called Lätt & Lagom and Bregott, clouded the issue of what should be called "margarine" and began the debate that led to the introduction of the term "spread". In 1978, an 80% fat product called Krona, made by churning a blend of dairy cream and vegetable oils, was introduced in Europe and, in 1982, a blend of cream and vegetable oils called Clover was introduced in the UK by the Milk Marketing Board. The vegetable oil and cream spread I Can't Believe It's Not Butter! was introduced into the United States in 1981, and in the United Kingdom and Canada in 1991. In the US, products with less than 80% fat can be labeled spreads, but they can not be called margarine. Since the word margarine is less popular with consumers, manufacturers developed some products to have slightly less than the minimum amount of fat, so that they can legally avoid labeling their products as margarine.

In the 21st century, margarine spreads had many developments to improve their consumer appeal. Most brands phased out the use of hydrogenated oils and became trans fat free. Many brands launched refrigerator-stable margarine spreads that contain only one-third of the fat and calorie content of traditional spreads. Other varieties of spreads include those with added omega-3 fatty acids, low or no salt, added plant sterols (claimed to reduce blood cholesterol), olive oil, or certified vegan oils. In the early 21st century, manufacturers provided margarines in plastic squeeze bottles to ease dispensing and offered pink margarine as a novelty.

== Manufacturing process ==
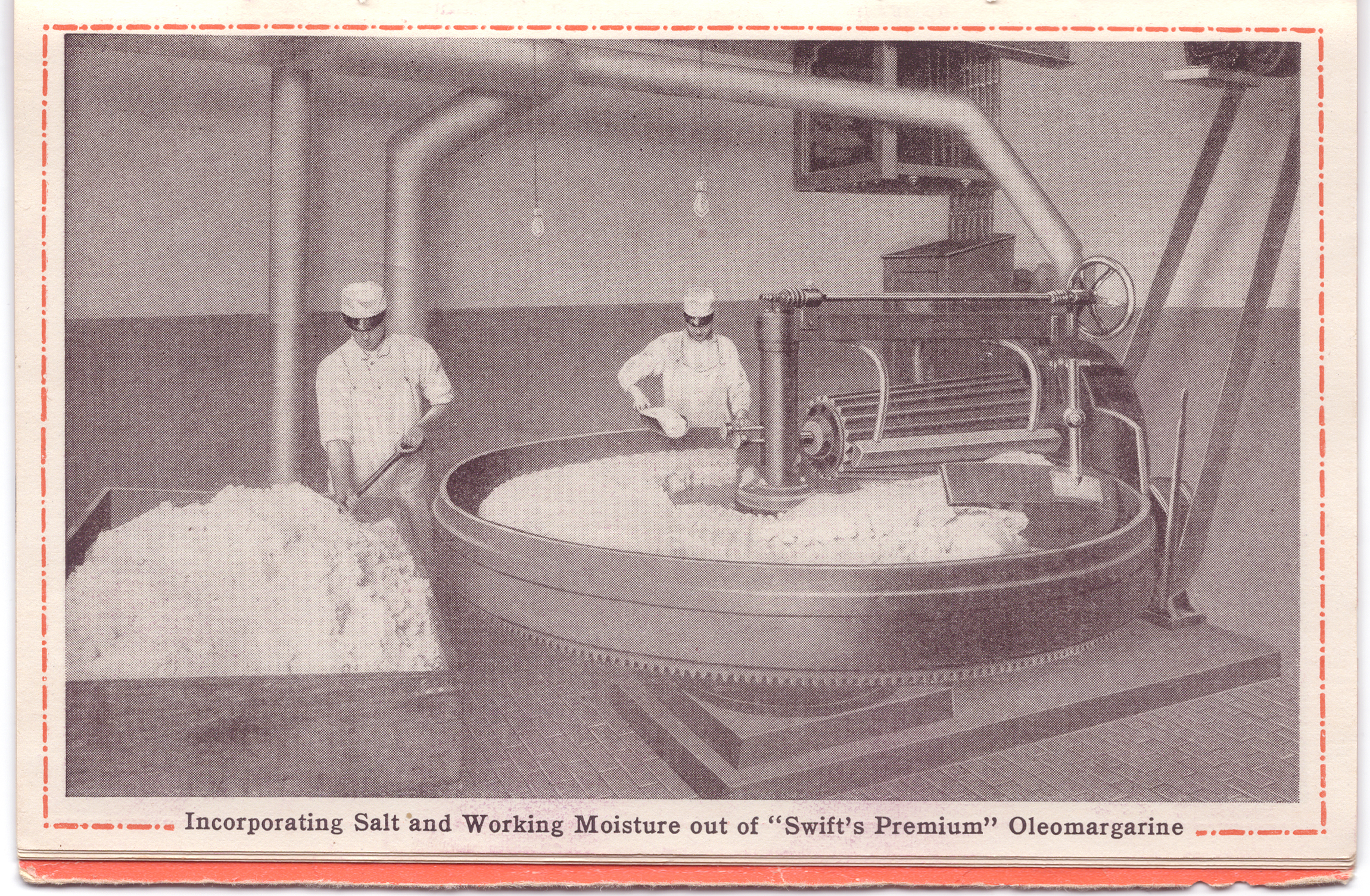
Postcard of "Incorporating Salt and Working Moisture out of "Swift's Premium" Oleomargarine", undated

The basic method of making margarine today consists of emulsifying a blend of oils and fats from vegetable and animal sources, which can be modified using fractionation, interesterification or hydrogenation, with skimmed milk which may be fermented or soured, salt, citric or lactic acid, chilling the mixture to solidify it, and working it to improve the texture. Margarines and vegetable fat spreads found in the market can range from 10% to 90% fat, depending on dietary marketing and purpose (spreading, cooking or baking). The softer tub margarines are made with less hydrogenated and more liquid oils than block margarines.

Three types of margarine are common:

- Bottled liquid margarine to cook or top dishes.
- Soft vegetable fat spreads, high in mono- or polyunsaturated fats, which are made from safflower, sunflower, soybean, cottonseed, rapeseed, or olive oil.
- Hard margarine (sometimes uncolored) for cooking or baking.

To produce margarine, first oils and fats are extracted, e.g. by pressing from seeds, and then refined. Oils may undergo a full or partial hydrogenation process to solidify them. The milk/water mixture is kept separate from the oil mixture until the emulsion step. The fats are warmed so that they are liquid during the mixing process. The water-soluble additives are added to the water or milk mixture, and emulsifiers such as lecithin are added to help disperse the water phase evenly throughout the oil. Other water-soluble additives include powdered skim milk, salt, citric acid, lactic acid, and preservatives such as potassium sorbate. The fat soluble additives are mixed into the oil. These include carotenoids for coloring and antioxidants. Then the two mixtures are emulsified by slowly adding the oil into the milk/water mixture with constant stirring. Next, the mixture is cooled. Rapid chilling avoids the production of large crystals and results in a smooth texture. The product is then rolled or kneaded. Finally, the product may be aerated with nitrogen to facilitate spreading it.

Production of margarine

Per capita production of margarine

=== Hydrogenation ===
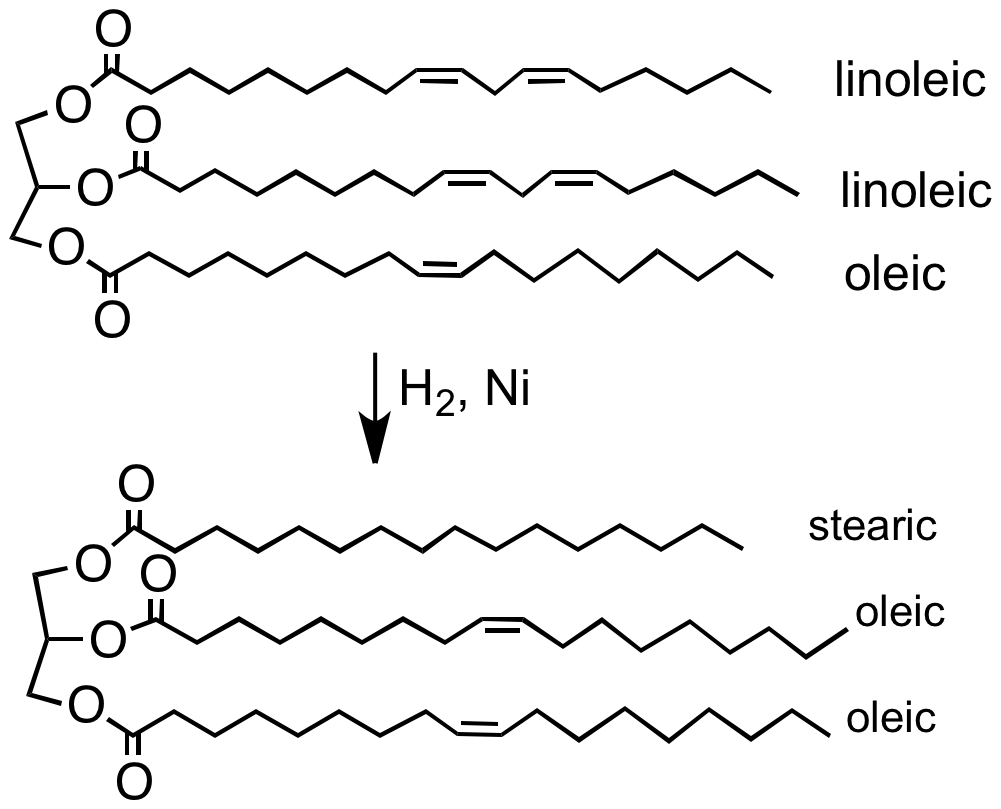
Partial hydrogenation of a typical plant oil to a typical component of margarine. Most of the C=C double bonds are removed in this process, which elevates the melting point of the product.

Vegetable and animal fats are similar compounds with different melting points. Fats that are liquid at room temperature are generally known as oils. The melting points are related to the presence of carbon–carbon double bonds in the fatty acids components. A higher number of double bonds gives a lower melting point. Oils can be converted into solid substances at room temperature through hydrogenation.

Commonly, natural oils are hydrogenated by passing hydrogen gas through the oil in the presence of a nickel catalyst, under controlled conditions. The addition of hydrogen to the unsaturated bonds (alkenic double C=C bonds) results in saturated C–C bonds, effectively increasing the melting point of the oil and thus "hardening" it. This is due to the increase in van der Waals' forces between the saturated molecules compared with the unsaturated molecules. However, as there are possible health benefits in limiting the amount of saturated fats in the human diet, the process is controlled so that only enough of the bonds are hydrogenated to give the required texture. Margarines made in this way are said to contain hydrogenated fat. This method is used today for some margarines although the process has been developed and sometimes other metal catalysts are used such as palladium. If hydrogenation is incomplete (partial hardening), the relatively high temperatures used in the hydrogenation process tend to flip some of the carbon–carbon double bonds into the "trans" form. If these particular bonds are not hydrogenated during the process, they remain present in the final margarine in molecules of trans fats, the consumption of which has been shown to be a risk factor for cardiovascular disease. For this reason, partially hardened fats are used less and less in the margarine industry. Some tropical oils, such as palm oil and coconut oil, are naturally semi-solid and do not require hydrogenation.

== Nutrition ==
Margarine, soybean oil spread, 70% fat
Nutritional value per 100 g (3.5 oz)
- Energy: 2,627 kJ (628 kcal)
- Carbohydrates: 1.5 g
- Fat: 70.2 g
- Protein: 0.3 g
Vitamins and minerals
Vitamins	Quantity %DV^{†}
Vitamin A	3571 IU
Thiamine (B1)	4% 0.052 mg
Riboflavin (B2)	2% 0.025 mg
Pantothenic acid (B5)	0% 0.001 mg
Vitamin B6	0% 0.003 mg
Folate (B9)	0% 1 μg
Vitamin C	0% 0 mg
Vitamin E	37% 5.6 mg
Minerals	Quantity %DV^{†}
Calcium	1% 7 mg
Iron	1% 0.12 mg
Magnesium	0% 2 mg
Manganese	1% 0.014 mg
Phosphorus	1% 10 mg
Potassium	2% 46 mg
Sodium	30% 700 mg
Zinc	1% 0.06 mg
- Other constituents: Quantity
- Water: 26.2 g
- Link to USDA Database entry
- ^{†}Percentages estimated using US recommendations for adults, except for potassium, which is estimated based on expert recommendation from the National Academies.

Margarine manufactured from soybean oil and pasteurized is 70% fat (14% saturated fat), 2% carbohydrates, 26% water, and contains negligible protein (table). In a reference amount of 100 g (3.5 oz), margarine provides 628 calories and is a rich source (20% or more of the Daily Value, DV) of vitamin E (37% DV) and sodium (30% DV; salt added for flavor; table). Unless fortified with micronutrients during manufacturing, there are no other nutrients in significant content.

By comparison, butter (also manufactured with added salt) is 81% fat (51% saturated fat), 16% water, 1% protein, and contains negligible carbohydrates. In a reference amount of 100 g (3.5 oz), salted butter supplies 717 calories and 76% of the DV for vitamin A, 15% DV for vitamin E, and 28% DV for sodium, with no other micronutrients in significant content. In 100 grams, salted butter contains 215 mg of cholesterol. The small traces of lactose in butter are unlikely to cause symptoms for lactose intolerant people, but people with milk allergies may prefer margarine because butter contains enough of the allergy-causing proteins to cause reactions.

=== Amount of fat ===
The roles of butter and traditional margarine (80% fat) are similar with respect to their energy content, but low-fat margarines and spreads are also widely available. Of the 81 g (2.9 oz) of total fat in butter, saturated fat is 51 g, monounsaturated fat is 21 g, polyunsaturated fat is 3 g, trans fat is 3 g, and trans fat designated as "18:1 t" is 3 g, for a total of 81 g (source for table).

=== Saturated fat ===
Replacing saturated and trans unsaturated fats with unhydrogenated monounsaturated or polyunsaturated fats is more effective in preventing coronary heart disease than reducing overall fat intake. See saturated fat and cardiovascular disease.

Vegetable fats can contain anything from 7% to 86% saturated fatty acids. Liquid oils (canola oil, sunflower oil) tend to be on the low end, while tropical oils (coconut oil, palm kernel oil) and fully hardened (hydrogenated) oils are at the high end of the scale. A margarine blend is a mixture of both types of components. Generally, firmer margarines contain more saturated fat.

Typical soft tub margarine contains 10% to 20% of saturated fat. Regular butterfat contains 52 to 65% saturated fats. The American Institute of Medicine and the European Food Safety Authority recommend saturated fat intake to be as low as possible.

=== Unsaturated fat ===
Dietary replacement of foods rich in saturated fatty acids with foods rich in unsaturated fatty acids has been found to decrease serum LDL cholesterol levels, thus reducing the risk of developing cardiovascular diseases.

There are two types of unsaturated oils: mono- and poly-unsaturated fats, both of which are recognized as beneficial to health in contrast to saturated fats. Some widely grown vegetable oils, such as canola, sunflower, safflower, and olive oils contain high amounts of unsaturated fats. During the manufacture of margarine, makers may convert some unsaturated fat into hydrogenated fats or trans fats to give them a higher melting point so they stay solid at room temperatures.

- Omega-3 fatty acids
  Omega-3 fatty acids are a family of polyunsaturated fatty acids. This is one of the two essential fatty acids, so called because humans cannot manufacture it and must get it from food. Omega-3 fatty acids are mostly obtained from oily fish caught in northern waters. They are comparatively uncommon in vegetable sources, including margarine. However, one type of omega-3 fatty acid, alpha-linolenic acid (ALA) can be found in some vegetable oils. Flax oil contains 30–50% of ALA, and is becoming a popular dietary supplement to rival fish oils; both are often added to premium margarines. Small amounts of ALA are found in vegetable oils such as soybean oil (7.8%) and canola oil (9.2%).
- Omega-6 fatty acids
  Omega-6 fatty acids are also important for health. They include the essential fatty acid linoleic acid (LA), which is abundant in vegetable oils grown in temperate climates. Some, such as hemp (60%) and the common margarine oils corn (60%), cottonseed (50%) and sunflower (50%), have large amounts, but most temperate oil seeds have over 10% LA. Margarine is typically high in omega-6 fatty acids.

=== Trans fat ===
Unlike essential fatty acids, trans fatty acids are not essential and are widely known to cause a host of medical problems in humans and raise overall mortality. Trans fat raise levels of LDL cholesterol, lower levels of HDL cholesterol, increase the risk of prostate and colorectal cancer, and are correlated with low birthweight in infants. This has led to their banning in major countries including the United States.

In the United States, partial hydrogenation, which produces trans fats, had been common as a result of preference for domestically produced oils. Recently, new margarine varieties have been developed that contain less or no trans fat. As of 2021, foods with added partially-hydrogenated oils should no longer be on US store shelves.

=== Plant sterol esters and stanol esters ===
Plant sterol esters or plant stanol esters have been added to some margarines and spreads because of their cholesterol-lowering effect. Several studies have indicated that consumption of about 2 grams per day provides a reduction in LDL cholesterol of about 10%.

=== Market acceptance ===
Margarine, particularly polyunsaturated margarine, has become a major part of the Western diet and had overtaken butter in popularity in the mid-20th century. In the United States, for example, in 1930, the average person ate over 18 lb (8.2 kg) of butter a year and just over 2 lb (0.91 kg) of margarine. By the end of the 20th century, an average American ate around 5 lb (2.3 kg) of butter and nearly 8 lb (3.6 kg) of margarine. By the 1970's however, concerns about trans fats and the health impact of saturated fats reversed consumer trends. By 2005 US butter consumption once again overtook margarine.

Consumers may choose margarine for a number of reasons, including lower cost, ease of availability, a perception (primarily relevant for vegetable-based margarines) that it is healthier than butter, a desire to avoid consuming animal-based products (of particular concern for vegans and also based on the assumption that the margarine is vegetable-based) or a simple personal preference to butter or other spreads for taste.

Margarine has a particular market value to those who observe the Jewish dietary laws of Kashrut, which forbids the mixing of meat and dairy products; hence there are strictly kosher non-dairy margarines available, known as pareve. These are often used by the kosher-observant consumers to adapt recipes that use meat and butter or in baked goods served with meat meals. The 2008 Passover margarine shortage in America caused much consternation within the kosher-observant community.

== National standards ==
=== Australia ===
Margarine is common in Australian supermarkets. Sales of the product have decreased in recent years due to consumers "reducing their use of spreads in their daily diet". Butter-colored margarine was sold from its introduction in Australia, but dairy and associated industries lobbied governments strongly in a vain attempt to have them change its color, or ban it altogether.

Australia New Zealand Food Standards Code – Standard 2.4.2 – Edible Oil Spreads requires that edible oil spreads and table margarine must contain no less than 55 μg/kg of vitamin D.

=== Canada ===
Canadian standard B.09.016 states that margarine shall be:

"An emulsion of fat, or water in fat, oil, or fat and oil that are not derived from milk and shall contain not less than 80% fat and not less than 3300 IU of vitamin A and 530 IU of vitamin D, and may contain (i) skim milk powder, buttermilk powder or liquid buttermilk, (ii) whey solids or modified whey solids,"

Calorie-reduced margarine is specified in standard B.09.017 as:

"Containing not less than 40% fat and having 50% of the calories normally present in margarine."

In 2007, Health Canada released an updated version of Canada's Food Guide that recommended Canadians choose "soft" margarine spreads that are low in saturated and trans fats and limit traditional "hard" margarines, butter, lard, and shortening in their diets.

=== European Union ===
Under European Union directives, distinguishes between spreadable fats:

"A water-in-oil emulsion derived from vegetable/animal fats, with a fat content of at least 10% but less than 90%, that remain solid at a temperature of 20°C and are suitable as spread."

and margarine:

"To avoid any possible confusion, the Regulation limits the use of the terms "butter" and "margarine" to products with a fat content of not less than 80%."

Margarines may not have a milk fat content of more than 3%. For blends and blended spreads, the milk fat may be between 10% and 80%.

Spread that contains 60 to 62% of fat may be called "three-quarter-fat margarine" or "reduced-fat margarine". Spread that contains 39 to 41% of fat may be called "half-fat margarine", "low-fat margarine", or "light margarine". Spreads with any other percentage of fat are called "fat spread" or "light spread".

Many member states currently require the mandatory addition of vitamins A and D to margarine and fat spreads for reasons of public health. Voluntary fortification of margarine with vitamins had been practiced by manufacturers since 1925, but in 1940 with the advent of the war, certain governments took action to safeguard the nutritional status of their nations by making the addition of vitamin A and D compulsory. This mandatory fortification was justified in the view that margarine was being used to replace butter in the diet.

=== United Kingdom ===
In the United Kingdom, no brands of spread on sale contain partially hydrogenated oils. Fortification with vitamins A and D is no longer mandatory for margarine; this brings it in line with other spreads wherein fortification is not required.

=== United States ===
Per US federal regulation, products must have a minimum fat content of 80% (with a maximum of 16% water) to be labeled "margarine" in the United States, although the term is used informally to describe vegetable-oil-based spreads with lower fat content.

== Legal issues ==
Since margarine intrinsically appears white or almost white, by preventing the addition of artificial coloring agents, legislators found they could limit competition against the dairy industries by discouraging the consumption of margarine based on visual appeal. If margarine were colored the same as butter, consumers would see it as being virtually the same thing as butter, and as a quasi-natural product. Bans on adding color became commonplace in the United States, Canada, and Denmark and, in some cases, those bans endured for almost 100 years. The rivalry between the dairy industry and the oleomargarine industry persists even today.

=== Canada ===
In Canada, margarine was prohibited from 1886 to 1948, though this ban was temporarily lifted from 1917 until 1923 due to dairy shortages. Nevertheless, bootleg margarine was produced in the neighboring Dominion of Newfoundland from whale, seal, and fish oil by the Newfoundland Butter Company and was smuggled to Canada where it was widely sold for half the price of butter. The Supreme Court of Canada lifted the margarine ban in 1948 in the Margarine Reference. That year, Newfoundland negotiated its entry into the Canadian Confederation, and one of its three non-negotiable conditions for union with Canada was "an assurance that Newfoundland would be able to continue to manufacture and sell margarine".

In 1950, as a result of a court ruling giving provinces the right to regulate the product, rules were implemented in much of Canada regarding margarine's color, requiring that it be bright yellow or orange in some provinces or colorless in others. By the 1980s, most provinces had lifted the restriction. However, in Ontario it was not legal to sell butter-colored margarine until 1995. Quebec, the last Canadian province to regulate margarine coloring, repealed its law requiring margarine to be colorless in July 2008.

=== New Zealand ===
In New Zealand, the Margarine Acts of 1895 and 1908 prohibited the manufacture of margarine without a licence from the Minister of Agriculture and made it illegal to "mix, colour, stain, or powder margarine with any ingredient or material so as to imitate butter". The acts were repealed by the Dairy Industry Amendment Act 1989, however previous amendments in 1972 and 1980 had allowed "virtually an opened market".

=== United States ===
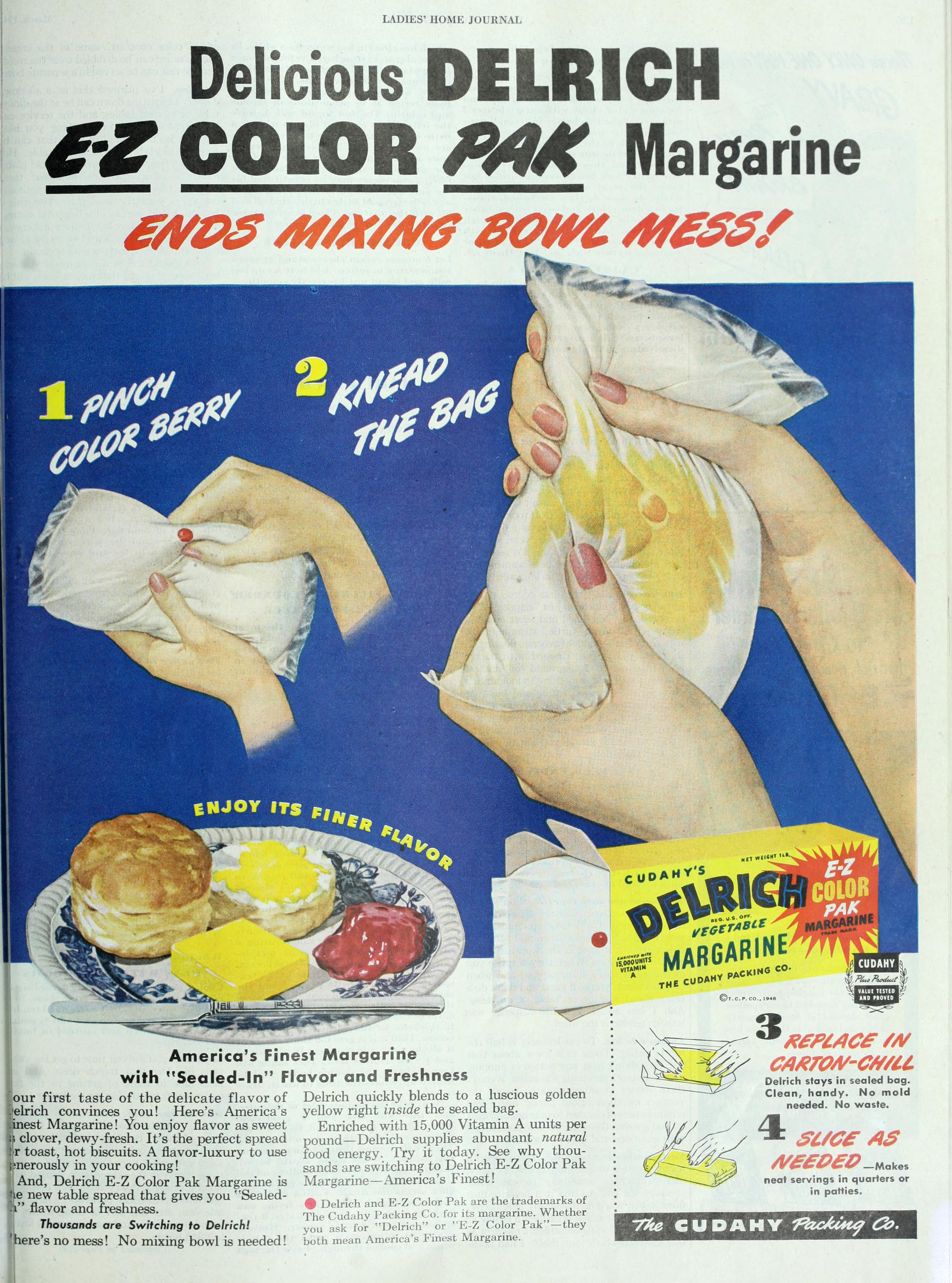
Cudahy's Delrich brand of margarine used a "color berry" to color its white vegetable-based margarine yellow. This 1948 advertisement demonstrates how to color the margarine inside the package

In 1877, New York became the first U.S. state to attempt legal restriction of the sale of oleomargarine through compulsory labeling. The law, "to prevent deception in sales of butter," required retailers to provide customers with a slip of paper that identified the "imitation" product as margarine. This law proved ineffective, as it would have required an army of inspectors and chemists to enforce it. By the mid-1880s, the U.S. federal government had introduced a tax of two cents per pound, and manufacturers needed an expensive license to make or sell the product. The simple expedient of requiring oleo manufacturers to color their product distinctively was, however, left out of early federal legislation. But individual states began to require the clear labeling of margarine. The color bans, drafted by the butter lobby, began in the dairy states of New York and New Jersey. In several states, legislatures enacted laws to require margarine manufacturers to add pink colorings to make the product look unpalatable, despite the objections of the oleo manufacturers that butter dairies themselves added annatto to their product to imitate the yellow of mid-summer butter.

By the start of the 20th century, eight out of ten Americans could not buy yellow margarine, and those who could had to pay a hefty tax on it. In 1902, the tax on yellow margarine was 10¢ a pound (equivalent to $3.80/lb in 2026). Bootleg colored margarine became common, and manufacturers began to supply food-coloring capsules so the consumer could knead the yellow color into margarine before serving it. Nevertheless, the regulations and taxes had a significant effect: the 1902 restrictions on margarine color, for example, cut annual consumption in the United States from 120,000,000 to 48,000,000 pounds (54,000 to 22,000 t).

With the coming of World War I, margarine consumption increased enormously, even in countries away from the front, such as the United States. In the countries closest to the fighting, dairy products became almost unobtainable and were strictly rationed. The United Kingdom, for example, depended on imported butter from Australia and New Zealand, and the risk of submarine attacks meant little arrived.

The long-running battle between the margarine and dairy lobbies continued: in the United States, the Great Depression brought a renewed wave of pro-dairy legislation; the Second World War, a swing back to margarine. After the war, the margarine lobby gained power and, little by little, the main margarine restrictions were lifted. The federal margarine tax system was repealed in 1951, while the last statewide restrictions on margarine were lifted in Minnesota in 1963 and Wisconsin in 1967. Some unenforced laws remain on the books.

== See also ==
- Cooking oil
- List of spreads
- Spread (food)
- Shortening
- Margarine brands (Category)
