= Newfoundland Margarine Company =

The Newfoundland Margarine Company (until 1950, the Newfoundland Butter Company) was Canada's first oleomargarine manufacturing company, and a leading producer in the Dominion of Newfoundland and after 1949, the province of Newfoundland and Labrador. It was founded by Sir John Chalker Crosbie in 1925 and was one of three margarine plants established in Newfoundland during the early 20th century. With the expertise of George Ehlers, a Danish chemist, the Crosbie family grew the firm into the largest margarine manufacturing firm in Newfoundland. The Newfoundland Butter Company through acquisition and merger over the years with the other two manufacturing plants was eventually sold to Lever Brothers of England in 1937 and became a subsidiary of Lever Brothers of Canada.

In 1949, after Newfoundland decided to join Canada, the operations of the company within the province were protected as part of the terms of union, since margarine production was then banned in the rest of Canada. To reflect the product of manufacture, the company name was changed in 1950 to the Newfoundland Margarine Company. In 2004, Unilever closed down the plant as part of a consolidation of its manufacturing properties.

== Background ==
Oleomargarine was invented by a French chemist in 1869, which uses a variety of soluble and insoluble ingredients, which quickly became an alternative to butter. Oleomargarine or margarine manufacturing plants which used beef fat and lard as main ingredients were established as an inexpensive alternative to butter manufacture, which traditionally used dairy products. Soon after its invention it came under regulation, to protect the dairy industry where taxes were levied on yellow margarine and in some countries an outright ban on its sale.

Newfoundland did not have a strong dairy industry at the turn of the 19th century, and subsequently embraced the production of margarine. Then in 1883, under the direction of Robert A. Brehm, Harvey and Company started the first margarine manufacturing plant. This plant used fish and seal oils in its production. Brehm had left Harvey and Company shortly thereafter and started a second manufacturing plant under the name Hearn and Company, which he eventually renamed Brehm Manufacturing Company after the death of his partners.

== Early history ==
A third manufacturing plant was opened in St. John’s by John Chalker Crosbie in 1925. Crosbie was inspired by a trip to Denmark, where oils from its whaling and sealing industry contributed to a prosperous margarine manufacturing business, despite the country's agrarian economy and large dairy industry. Crosbie thought that Newfoundland, which didn't have a large dairy industry and which produced large amounts of margarine ingredients such as fish oil, whale oil, seal oil as fishing byproducts, would be a good place to set up a margarine plant. The plant hired the expertise of a Danish chemist, Georg Ebers in its manufacture.

Crosbie's political opponents accused Crosbie of using his position as Newfoundland's Minister of Finance to enrich himself, because the plant opened the same year that a six cent per pound tariff was introduced on foreign margarine imports. Crosbie was also accused of using his public office to secure exclusive supply arrangements for his company with Newfoundland's public institutions.

Within a short time, this firm had taken a leading role in the production of margarine for the country and was so successful that Crosbie expanded its operations to Brazil, but that branch was soon nationalized. The plant produced hard margarine bricks that were popular in Newfoundland's isolated rural communities such as outports, which often had no electricity or refrigeration. Its product was successful from the onset because some of the first tubs had gold and silver coins, encouraging customers to purchase them in the hopes of finding one. This initial product was sold in wooden tubs under the brands of Golden Spread and Silver Spread.

Crosbie also increased the prominence of his plant by decorating it with floral arrangements. He also built a neon sign of a cow with a swishing tail that was the first of its kind in the province. Because the sign was prominent in the St. John's skyline at night, it was turned off during the Second World War so it did not help the Kriegsmarine in locating the city.

In 1932, its founder, John Crosbie, died, and control of the company passed to his family. In 1937, the original two companies, Harvey and Company and Brehm Manufacturing Company had amalgamated in 1932 to become the Newfoundland Butter Company's leading competitor and sold their plant to Lever Brothers of England under Unilever Limited. The same year, the Crosbie family sold the Newfoundland Butter Company to Unilever as well. Unilever continued to employ members of the Crosbie family in executive roles at the plant until Roger Crosbie retired in 2000. After the sale, the two plants were consolidated and the only remaining factory was, that of the Newfoundland Butter Company on LeMarchant Road.

Major brands produced by the Newfoundland Margarine Company were Good Luck and Eversweet. Other popular brands made by the company include Oversweet and Mom's. All of these products become staples of many households within the province of Newfoundland and Labrador.

== Margarine and Confederation ==
In 1949, after Newfoundland decided to join Canada, the operations of the company within the province were protected as part of the terms of union, since margarine production was then banned in the rest of Canada. Margarine manufacture in Canada was banned in 1886 and remained so until 1948 except for the period from 1917 to 1923 when the ban was lifted because of shortages of butter during the war. However, Newfoundland continued to manufacture margarine (the first plant had opened in 1883) and at times sold margarine to the rest of Canada at half the price of butter.

Negotiations before Newfoundland joined in confederation with the rest of Canada led to Term 46 of the Newfoundland Act. A stipulation within Term 46 prohibited the sale of margarine to the rest of Canada but allowed the manufacture and sale of margarine within Newfoundland as noted herein:

Unless the Parliament of Canada otherwise provides or unless the sale and manufacture in, and the interprovincial movement between, all provinces of Canada other than Newfoundland, of oleomargarine and margarine, is lawful under the laws of Canada, oleomargarine or margarine shall not be sent, shipped, brought, or carried from the Province of Newfoundland into any other province of Canada.
Text of the Term 46 Schedule Part 2 of British North America Act 1949 (c.22) as originally enacted or made within the United Kingdom, from legislation.gov.uk.

After the joining of the Dominion of Newfoundland into confederation with Canada the Newfoundland Butter Company became the first margarine manufacturing plant in Canada. Due to Term 46 regarding the sale of margarine it became unlawful to ship to any other province within Canada. This turn of events did not please everyone and it drew well known Newfoundland political satirist and poet Greg Power (1909–1997) to write the poem The Ballad of Oleo Margarine.

The Ballad of Oleo Margarine
I pray that I shall never know
A future without oleo,
Or live to see my little sons
Turn up their noses at my buns;
But there is one with soul so dead,
Who’d sacrifice our spread for bread,
And ban from every Newfie table
Our wholesome, rich, improved Green Label.
- excerpt from The Ballad of Oleo Margarine, Greg Power (1909 - 1997)

== Later history and closure ==
After the Newfoundland Butter Company was allowed to sell its margarine within the province even after it acceded to Confederation, margarine producers across Canada used it in their ultimately successful lobbying efforts to allow the product to be made and sold in the rest of the country. In 1950, the company changed its name to the Newfoundland Margarine Company to better reflect its actual product.

In early 2000 Unilever made the announcement that it will be closing the manufacturing plant in St. John's.

The process of closure began in 2003, at which point the factory only employed seventeen people, and Unilever's Canadian operations was centralized in their Toronto plant in Rexdale.

The plant was one of 100 that were closed by Unilever to consolidate its worldwide production facilities. The plant was finally closed in March 2004. The building was demolished in 2007 to make way for a Shoppers Drug Mart.

== See also ==
- Architecture of St. John's
- History of Newfoundland and Labrador
