= Bitul =

Bitul or batel (nullification or of no significance) is a concept in kashrut that stipulates that food is still considered kosher if a small amount of forbidden food is mixed with a permitted food, such as a drop of milk in a meat dish. Bitul b'shishim (Hebrew: בטל בשישים) is the concept that a dish is kosher if the prohibited food is less than one-sixtieth of the entire dish. Bitul barov is the concept that a dish is kosher if less than one-half of the meal contains prohibited food.

Orthodox Union Kosher does not allow for bitul containing non-kosher foods. To accommodate Sephardi Jews who do not mix fish and dairy, dairy products containing fish that is not batel b'shishim are listed as OU Dairy Fish. Products containing more than one-sixtieth fish, for example Worcestershire sauces containing anchovies or marshmallows containing fish gelatin, are certified by the Orthodox Union as "OU Fish". However, products containing less than one-sixtieth fish are not required to be labelled with the OU Fish hechsher as long as the fish ingredient is listed on the package.

Cheese made with rennet from an animal who has not been ritually slaughtered is not kosher, due to the presence of non-kosher meat. Many hard cheeses contain less than one-sixtieth animal rennet, but non-kosher animal rennet is not bitul because the rennet is considered dovor ha-ma’amid (a material that gives a product its form).

== See also ==
- Halakha
- Kashrut
- Milk and meat in Jewish law
- Treyf
