= Kezayit =

Talmudic unit of volume approximately equal to the size of an average olive

Kezayit, k'zayit, or kezayis (Hebrew: כְּזַיִת) is a Talmudic unit of volume approximately equal to the size of an average Talmudic-Era Israeli olive. The word itself literally means "like an olive." The rabbis differ on the precise definition of the unit:

- Rabbeinu Yitzchak (the Ri) defines it as one-half of a beytza (the volume of a Talmudic-Era chicken egg, literally meaning “egg”).
- Maimonides specified that a 'grogeret' (dried fig) was one-third of a beytza, making this the maximum size for a kezayit, which is smaller. Rabbeinu Tam made the argument explicitly, though, using a slightly different calculation came out with a maximum definition of three-tenths.
- According to some interpretations, including the Chazon Ish, the zayit is not related to other units by a fixed ratio, but rather should only be conceived of independently as the size of an average olive.

Its uses in halacha include:

- The minimum amount of food that, when eaten, is halachically considered "eating." This has implications throughout the spectrum of halacha, including:
  - For prohibitions of consumption, as in the eating of milk and meat
  - For the saying of a Bracha Ahrona (the traditional grace after meals)
- People exposed to at least a kezayit of the flesh of a dead body become ritually impure.

== See also ==
- Ancient Hebrew units of measurement
