= 2008 Passover margarine shortage =

2008 US shortage of kosher margarine

During the 2008 Passover season, margarine that is kosher-for-Passover was in short supply in the United States due to several issues, leading to a scramble among kosher consumers to obtain the staple, as it features prominently in many Passover recipes.

== Causes ==
One factor contributing to the shortage was the shortage of cottonseed oil, the main ingredient used in most kosher-for-Passover margarine. Cottonseed oil is used instead of alternate vegetable oils, such as corn or soybean oil, which are not considered kosher-for-Passover under Ashkenazi customs relating to kitniyot (legumes and seeds). Cottonseed oil is a byproduct of cotton production; because of US demand for corn (maize) ethanol, many farmers switched from cotton cultivation to more-lucrative corn.

Additionally, some previous manufacturers of Passover margarine discontinued producing the product after deciding it was not economically feasible. The process of cleansing a factory to make it suitable for producing kosher-for-Passover margarine is complicated, and involves dismantling much of the equipment.

Some of the previous manufacturers felt it was no longer practical to undergo these procedures for a short-term project. Manischewitz and Mother's, two of the largest kosher margarine brands, were only able to provide limited amounts to the marketplace, which were often not in the popular stick form.

== Impact ==
A tub of Mother's Kosher for Passover margarine

The margarine shortage affected home Passover baking. Dishes which comply with Passover rules are often somewhat lacking in taste, and for this reason margarine is a key ingredient in many Passover recipes. Often, no substitute is available.

Since the laws of kashrut mandate the separation of milk and meat (including products derived from them), margarine is an important butter substitute in recipes that are served with meat meals. Recipes requiring large amounts of margarine include Passover desserts, such as cookies.

Many stores rationed sales of kosher-for-Passover margarine by limiting the number of cases of margarine that could be purchased per customer; some stores required a minimum number of other items to be purchased.

Haolam, a large manufacturer of kosher cheeses, was able to produce margarine for Passover to meet some of the demands.

== Other shortages ==
In addition to margarine, matzo was also in short supply for the 2008 Passover season, as were the Tam Tam matzo crackers manufactured by Manischewitz.

Possible reasons for the matzo shortage included decisions by Trader Joe's and Costco not to stock matzo for 2008, and manufacturing problems at Manischewitz that forced the company to withhold Tam Tams for the year, and to produce less matzo and none of the more strictly-made shmurah matzo preferred by many traditionalist Jews.

== See also ==
- Kosher for Passover – Leavened foods forbidden on Passover
- Passover foods – Foods traditionally eaten during Passover
- Kashrut – Jewish dietary laws
- Kitniyot – Category of food that some Ashkenazi Jews do not eat on Passover
