= Minhag Ashkenaz =

Minhag Ashkenaz is the minhag of the Ashkenazi German Jews. Minhag Ashkenaz was common in Germany, Austria, the Czech lands, and elsewhere in Western Europe, in contrast to the Minhag Polin of the Eastern European Ashkenazi Jews.

== Minhag Ashkenaz and Minhag Polin ==
The term "Minhag Ashkenaz", strictly applied, refers only to the minhag of German Jews south and west of the Elbe, most notably the community of Frankfurt am Main. Jews in Germany were historically divided into the "Bayers" of Bavaria and southern Germany, who followed the Minhag Ashkenaz, and the "Polanders" in northern Germany who followed Minhag Polin.

== History ==
Following Kristallnacht, a number of German Jews (Yekkes) escaped Frankfurt, relocating to the Washington Heights neighborhood of New York City, where they still have a synagogue, Khal Adath Jeshurun (KAJ), which punctiliously adheres to the Yekkish liturgical text, rituals, and melodies. Unlike most Ashkenazic synagogues in the United States, which follow the Eastern Ashkenazic (Poilisher) liturgical rite, KAJ follows the Western Ashkenazic rite (Minhag Ashkenaz), in its liturgical text, practices, and melodies. They use the Rödelheim Siddur Sfas Emes (see: Wolf Heidenheim), though the congregation's nusach varies in some places from Rödelheim.

== Communities using Minhag Ashkenaz ==
List of communities, synagogues, and minyanim following Minhag Ashkenaz:

- Yeshivas Frankfurt - Frankfurt, Germany
- Yeshurun, Beis haKnesses kMinhog Ashkenaz - Bnei Brak, Israel
- K'hal Adas Yisroel - Bnei Brak, Israel
- K'hal Adas Yeshurun - Jerusalem (Ramot Polin)
- K'hal Adas Yeshurun - Beitar Illit, West Bank
- Beis Knesses k'Minhag Ashkenaz - Haifa, Israel
- Minyan k'Minhag Ashkenaz - Rekhasim, Israel
- K'hal Adas Yeshurun of Beit Shemesh - Beit Shemesh, Israel
- Kehillas Ashkenaz, Kiryat Sefer - Modi'in Illit, West Bank
- Ashkenaz Minyan in Brooklyn - New York City
- Passaic-Clifton Ashkenaz - Passaic, New Jersey
- Khal Yotzei Ashkenaz, Lakewood, NJ
- Israelitische Religionsgesellschaft Zürich, Zurich, Switzerland

== See also ==
- History of the Jews in Germany
- Minhag
- Nusach Ashkenaz
- Yekke
