= Pareve =

Kashrut classification of foods free from dairy and meat

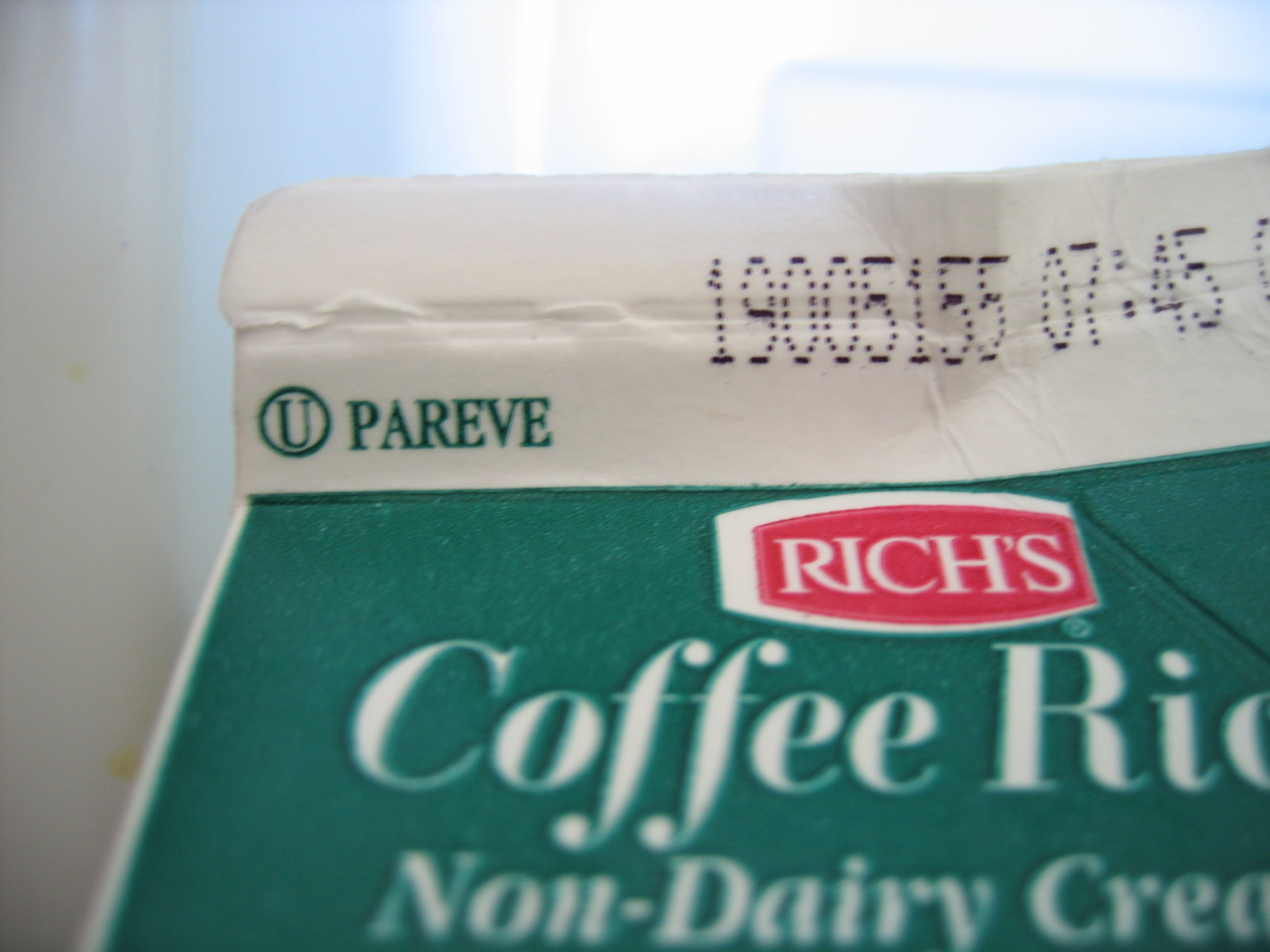
A non-dairy coffee creamer marked with a pareve label

In kashrut, the dietary laws of Judaism, pareve or parve (from Yiddish: פאַרעוו for "neutral"; in Hebrew פַּרוֶוה, parveh) is a classification of food that contains neither dairy nor meat ingredients. Food in this category includes all items that grow from the ground (fruits, vegetables, grains, etc.), fish (only Kosher fish), eggs, and non-biological edible items (such as water and salt).

Kashrut forbids the following; consuming mixtures of milk and meat, consuming milk and meat during the same meal, consuming dairy foods within a period of time after consuming meat (the time period varies by custom), consuming meat foods within a period of time after consuming dairy (the time period varies by custom), and using the same dishes for both dairy and meat. Pareve foods, being neutral, can be consumed with either dairy or meat.

== Laws ==
Eggs that have been laid are considered pareve because they are separate from the animal. But eggs found inside a bird after its slaughter are considered to be part of the animal and therefore have the status of meat. Commercially marketed eggs generally are not taken from slaughtered animals and therefore are pareve.

Kashrut requires that common bread must be made pareve, because bread is a staple food, and there is a strong chance one may forget that the bread contains dairy or meat ingredients. Bread need not be made pareve if it is made in an unusual shape or consumed on the same day it is made. Even vegetarians are required to refrain from baking non-pareve bread because kashrut applies equally to all Jews.

Food that contains only pareve ingredients but that comes in contact with dairy or meat dishes in the home or that is manufactured on equipment also used to manufacture dairy or meat equipment maintains the status of pareve, and may be consumed after eating dairy or meat. However, if such contact is made, it may only be consumed on dairy or meat dishes respectively. Some commercial products that are pareve but have been manufactured on dairy equipment bear the letters DE after the hechscher to let the consumer know the product cannot be consumed together with meat. Still, such an item can be consumed after a meat meal.

Pharmaceuticals taken for medical purposes that contain animal ingredients, while not technically pareve, do not require a waiting period following their consumption, as they are generally swallowed without being chewed and have little contact with the mouth. The laws of kashrut do not apply to pharmaceuticals taken for medical reasons. Vitamins, on the other hand, have the status of nourishment, and therefore, the laws of kashrut must be followed.

While kosher households generally have two sets of dishes, one for dairy and another for meat, some kosher households also include a third set of pareve dishes, or at least cooking utensils, in order to enable pareve foods to be prepared and then later served with either dairy or meat meals.

While fish is pareve, the Talmud warns not to consume fish directly mixed with meat, and the custom is not to eat both on the same plate if they both are eaten at the same meal. It is Chabad custom to refrain from eating fish with milk, but combining fish with dairy byproducts (cheese, butter, etc.) is acceptable. A much less common practice is to refrain from eating fish combined with any dairy product.

== Pareve in commercial production ==
Due to the restrictions in Jewish law forbidding combining milk and meat, many food items marketed to kosher consumers are made pareve, thereby modifying traditional recipes and allowing the item to be consumed either with dairy or meat. Common ingredients used as substitutes for either dairy or meat ingredients include soy and tofu, palm and coconut oils, and various vegetables. Meat analogues are used to replace real meat in recipes, and soy cheese to replace real cheese. Some meat analogues include dairy.

The laws of marit ayin forbid eating a pareve food that appears dairy together with meat or vice versa. However, with the wide commercial availability of such pareve imitations of both dairy and meat foods, today this is permitted.

Margarine is commonly used in place of butter, thereby enabling baked goods to be made pareve. In 2008, a shortage of kosher for Passover margarine made it difficult for kosher consumers to prepare pareve recipes.

Cultured meat can be considered pareve, according to David Lau, the former Chief Rabbi of Israel.

== Pareve and vegetarianism ==
The word "pareve" on a food label may imply the product is suitable for vegetarians or vegans, but this is not always true. Fish and fish products, like fish gelatin, are pareve, but in general not vegetarian and never vegan (but would be consumed by pescetarians). Honey, egg and egg products, like mayonnaise and albumen, are pareve and vegetarian but not vegan.

Some processes convert a meat or dairy product into a pareve substance. For example, rennet is sometimes made from stomach linings, yet is acceptable for making kosher cheese, but such cheeses might not be acceptable to some vegetarians, who would eat only cheese made from a vegetarian rennet.

Likewise, some products bearing a vegan certification label do not have the status in halakha as pareve due to incidental contact with dairy ingredients or utensils that render the item dairy, while still qualifying by the vegan certification as containing no animal products.

== Pareve and allergies ==
Those allergic to dairy foods may assume items labeled as "pareve" to be dairy-free, though this is not always the case. Kashrut has procedures by which equipment can be cleaned of its previous non-kosher use, but that might be inadequate for those with allergies, vegetarians, or adherents to other religious statutes. For example, dairy manufacturing equipment can be cleaned well enough that the rabbis grant pareve status to products manufactured with it. Nevertheless, someone with a strong allergic sensitivity to dairy products might still react to the dairy residue, and that is why some products that are legitimately pareve carry "milk" warnings. The general rule on such matters is that an item accidentally containing dairy ingredients could be considered pareve if the dairy is present in a fraction of less than 1/60 (1.67%) of the total though, in commercial pareve food production supervising agencies often try to be stricter than that. However, people with allergies can be sensitive to far lower concentrations of such ingredients – even parts-per-million concentrations – and therefore may not be able to rely on a pareve marking.

== Usage in slang ==
The word "pareve" is also used in contemporary Israeli slang to imply that something is mediocre or that a statement lacks a clear message.

== See also ==
- Halal
