= Milk and meat in Jewish law =

Halakhic texts relating to this article
- Torah: Exodus 23:19; Exodus 34:26; Deuteronomy 14:21
- Babylonian Talmud: Hullin 113b, 115b

The mixture of meat and dairy (Hebrew: בשר בחלב, romanized: basar bechalav, lit. 'meat in milk') is forbidden according to Jewish law. This dietary law, basic to kashrut, is based on two verses in the Book of Exodus, which forbid "boiling a (goat) kid in its mother's milk" and a third repetition of this prohibition in Deuteronomy.

== Explanations for the law ==
The rabbis of the Talmud gave no reason for the prohibition. Later authorities, such as Maimonides, opined that the law was connected to a prohibition of idolatry in Judaism. Obadiah Sforno and Solomon Luntschitz, rabbinic commentators living in the late Middle Ages, both suggested that the law referred to a specific Canaanite religious practice, in which young goats were cooked in their own mothers' milk, aiming to obtain supernatural assistance to increase the yield of their flocks. More recently, a theogonous text named the birth of the gracious gods, found during the rediscovery of Ugarit, has been interpreted as saying that a Levantine ritual to ensure agricultural fertility involved the cooking of a young goat in its mother's milk, followed by the mixture being sprinkled upon the fields. Still more recent sources argue that this translation is incorrect.

Some rabbinic commentators saw the law as having an ethical aspect. Rashbam argued that using the milk of an animal to cook its offspring was inhumane, based on a principle similar to that of Shiluach haken. Chaim ibn Attar compared the practice of cooking animals in their mother's milk to the slaying of nursing infants.

== The Torah law as understood by the rabbis ==
=== Three distinct laws ===
The Talmudic rabbis believed that the biblical text only forbade cooking a mixture of milk and meat, but because the biblical regulation is triplicated they imposed three distinct regulations to represent it:

- not cooking meat and milk together (regardless of whether the result was eaten)
- not eating milk and meat together (regardless of whether it was cooked together)
- not benefiting from the mixture in any other way

Jacob ben Asher, an influential medieval rabbi, said that the gematria of do not boil a kid (Hebrew: לא תבשל גדי) is identical to that of it is the prohibition of eating, cooking and deriving benefit (Hebrew: [היא] איסור אכילה ובישול והנאה :), a detail that he considered highly significant. Deriving benefit was later interpreted by medieval writers to include:

- Serving mixtures of milk and meat in a restaurant, even if the clientele are non-Jewish, and the restaurant is not intended to comply with kashrut
- Feeding a pet with food containing mixtures of milk and meat
- Obtaining a refund for an accidental purchase of mixtures of milk and meat, as a refund constitutes a form of sale

The classical rabbis only considered milk and meat cooked together biblically forbidden. Jewish writers of the Middle Ages also forbade consumption of anything merely containing the mixed tastes of milk and meat. This included, for example, meat that had been soaked in milk for an extended period. The prohibition against deriving benefit was seen as being more nuanced, with several early modern authorities (including Moses Isserles and David HaLevi Segal) said that this restriction only applied to the milk and meat of g'di, not to the much wider range of milks and meats prohibited by the rabbis; other prominent medieval rabbis, like Solomon Luria, disagreed, believing that the prohibition of deriving benefit referred to mixtures of all meats and milks.

=== The term "gedi" ===
The Book of Genesis refers to young goats by the Hebrew phrase gəḏî-‘izzîm (גדי עזים), but the prohibition against boiling a kid... only uses the term gəḏî (גדי). Rashi, one of the most prominent talmudic commentators, argued that the term gəḏî must actually have a more general meaning, including calves and lambs, in addition to young goats. Rashi also argued that the meaning of gəḏî is still narrow enough to exclude birds, all the undomesticated kosher animals (for example, chevrotains and antelope), and all of the non-kosher animals. The Talmudic writers had a similar analysis, but believed that since domesticated kosher animals (sheep, goats, and cattle) have similar meat to birds and to the non-domestic kosher land-animals, they should prohibit these latter meats too, creating a general prohibition against mixing milk and meat from any kosher animal, excepting fish.

Consumption of non-kosher animals (e.g., pigs, camels, and turtles) is prohibited in general, and questions about the status of mixtures involving their meat and milk would be somewhat academic. Nevertheless, the lack of a classical decision about milk and meat of non-kosher animals gave rise to argument in the late Middle Ages. Some, such as Yoel Sirkis and Joshua Falk, argued that mixing milk and meat from non-kosher animals should be prohibited, but others, like Shabbatai ben Meir and David HaLevi Segal, argued that, excluding the general ban on non-kosher animals, such mixtures should not be prohibited.

=== The term "halev immo" ===
Rashi expressed the opinion that the reference to mother's milk must exclude fowl from the regulation, since only mammals produce milk. According to Shabbethai Bass, Rashi was expressing the opinion that the reference to a mother was only present to ensure that birds were clearly excluded from the prohibition; Bass argued that Rashi regarded the ban on boiling meat in its mother's milk to really be a more general ban on boiling meat in milk, regardless of the relationship between the source of the meat and that of the milk.

Substances derived from milk, such as cheese and whey, have traditionally been considered to fall under the prohibition, but milk substitutes, created from non-dairy sources, do not. However, the classical rabbis were worried that Jews using artificial milk might be misinterpreted, so they insisted that the milk be clearly marked to indicate its source. In the classical era, the main form of artificial milk was almond milk, so the classical rabbis imposed the rule that almonds must be placed around such milk; in the Middle Ages, there was some debate about whether this had to be done during cooking as well as eating, or whether it was sufficient to merely do this during the meal.

=== The term "bishul" ===
Although the biblical regulation literally only mentions boiling (Hebrew: bishul,בישול), there were questions raised in the late Middle Ages about whether this should instead be translated as cooking, and hence be interpreted as a reference to activities like broiling, baking, roasting, and frying. Lenient figures like Jacob of Lissa and Chaim ibn Attar argued that such a prohibition would only be a rabbinic addition, and not the biblical intent, but others like Abraham Danzig and Hezekiah da Silva argued that the biblical term itself had this wider meaning.

Though radiative cooking of meat with dairy produce is not listed by the classical rabbis as being among the biblically prohibited forms of cooking such mixtures, a controversy remains about using a microwave oven to cook these mixtures.

== Rabbinic additions to the Biblical law ==
The classical rabbis interpreted Leviticus 18:30 to mean that they should (metaphorically) create a protective fence around the biblical laws, and this was one of the three principal teachings of the Great Assembly. Mixing of milk and meat is one area of halacha where a particularly large number of "fences" have been added. Nevertheless, the rabbis of the classical and Middle Ages also introduced a number of leniencies.

=== Minuscule quantities ===
The classical rabbis expressed the opinion that each of the food rules could be waived if the portion of food violating the regulations was less than a certain size, known as a shiur (Hebrew: שיעור, lit. 'size'), unless it was still possible to taste or smell it; for the "milk and meat" regulations, this minimal size was a ke'zayit (כזית), literally meaning anything "similar to an olive" in size. However, the shiur is merely the minimum amount that leads to formal punishment in the classical era, but even "half a shiur is prohibited by the Torah".

Many rabbis followed the premise that "taste is principal" (Hebrew: ta'am k'ikar, טעם כעיקר): in the event of an accidental mixing of milk and meat, the food could be eaten if there was no detectable change in taste. Others argued that forbidden ingredients could constitute up to half of the mixture before being disallowed. Today the rabbis apply the principle of batel b'shishim ('nullified in sixty'), that is, permissible so long as forbidden ingredients constitute no more than 1/60 of the whole. However, this principle does not apply when the forbidden ingredient causes a physical change on the mixture (Davar Ha'Ma'amid) or if it is a whole item or organism (Beriya).

Due to the premise that "taste is principal", parve (i.e., 'neutral') foods are considered to take on the same "meat/dairy produce" classification as anything they are cooked with.

=== Absorption of flavors ===
In certain circumstances, the laws of kashrut decree that a transfer or absorption of flavors occurs between different foods in that are in contact with each other. Thus a mixture of flavor between meat and dairy may result in a product which is non-kosher. Such a flavor transfer may be realized through any one of a number of processes.

- Heating two foods together at a temperature that would cause a hand to recoil from the heat (Yad soledes bo), generally assumed to be between 110°-115°F.
- Soaking two foods together in a liquid for 24 hours, after which the flavors are considered absorbed or transferred. This method is considered equivalent to cooking (Kavush ki'mevushal)
- Sharp and salty foods (Davar charif), such as onions, horseradish or pickled fish, may transfer flavors to and from a blade that slices or processes them. Regarding sharp liquids, there is disagreement how soon they transfer flavors to equipment while being processed. Some authorities postulate that this may occur in as little as six to eighteen minutes, (Bichdei she'yarsiach - the time it takes to heat the product), others permit a time frame of up to twenty four hours.
- In certain circumstances, such as in an oven chamber, hot food vapors (Zei'ah) may be absorbed into another food. In such a situation, the vapor has the ability to transfer flavors between different foods and between food and the equipment. Even if the vapor is "distilled" and reaches a high level of purity, its Halachic status remains identical to the food it was derives from. Thus condensed vapor from milk that was boiled remains dairy, as does vapor derived from meat liquids. Dry air, as well as other gases, does not have the ability to transfer flavors. Thus "dry steam" would theoretically be considered a gas and not a vapor. However it is difficult to ascertain how "dry" the steam really is, therefore, for all practical applications, all steam is considered vapor.

Equipment may too absorb flavors from the foods they process, and transfer those flavors to foods processed in them afterwards, or simultaneously in a different compartment. Thus meat and dairy foods may not be processed in shared equipment, if it involves hot or sharp food and there is direct contact between the food and the equipment. If the process does not involve hot food, the equipment must be cleaned thoroughly so that no residue remains of the previous food, be it meat or dairy, before processing food from the other category. Flavors may be shared across different pieces of equipment, but only if there is a liquid that serves as a medium between them.

=== Physical proximity ===
Prominent rabbis of the Middle Ages insisted that milk should not be placed on a table where people are eating meat, to avoid accidentally consuming milk while eating meat, and vice versa. Tzvi Hirsch Spira, an early 20th-century rabbi, argued that when this rule was created, the tables commonly in use were only large enough for one individual; Spira concludes that the rule would not apply if the table being used was large, and the milk was out of reach of the person eating meat (and vice versa).

The rabbis of the Middle Ages discussed the issue of people eating milk and meat at the same table. Jacob ben Asher suggested that each individual should eat from different tablecloths, while Moses Isserles argued that a large and obviously unusual item should be placed between the individuals, as a reminder to avoid sharing the foods. Later rabbinic writers pointed out exceptions to the rule. Chaim ibn Attar, an 18th-century kabbalist, ruled that sitting at the same table as a non-Jew eating non-kosher food was permissible; Yechiel Michel Epstein, a 19th-century rabbi, argued that the risk was sufficiently reduced if individuals sat far enough apart that the only way to share food was to leave the table.

== Classification of foods ==
To prevent the consumption of forbidden mixtures, foods are divided into three categories.

- "meat" (North America) or "meaty" (UK) (Yiddish: פֿליישיק, romanized: fleishik; Hebrew: בשרי, romanized: besari, b'sari)
- "dairy" (North America) or "milky" (UK) (Yiddish: מילכיק, romanized: milkhik; Hebrew: חלבי, romanized: halavi)
- parve (or parv, pareve; from the Yiddish word parev, פאַרעוו, meaning 'neutral')

Food in the parve category includes fish, fruit, vegetables, salt, etc.; among the Karaites and Ethiopian Jews it also includes poultry. The Talmud states that the Biblical prohibition applies only to meat and milk of domesticated kosher mammals; that is, cattle, goats, and sheep. It adds that according to the view of Rabbi Akiva, the Rabbis instituted a protective decree extending the law to the meat and milk of wild kosher mammals, such as deer, as well as the meat of kosher poultry, such as chickens. The Shulchan Aruch follows this approach.

Classical Jewish authorities argue that foods lose parve status if treated in such a way that they absorb the taste of milk or meat during cooking, soaking, or salting. Thus parve foods cooked in utensils of one of the meat-milk categories may not be eaten with food of the other category, however there need not be a waiting period before eating food from the other category.

== Dishes and cooking utensils ==
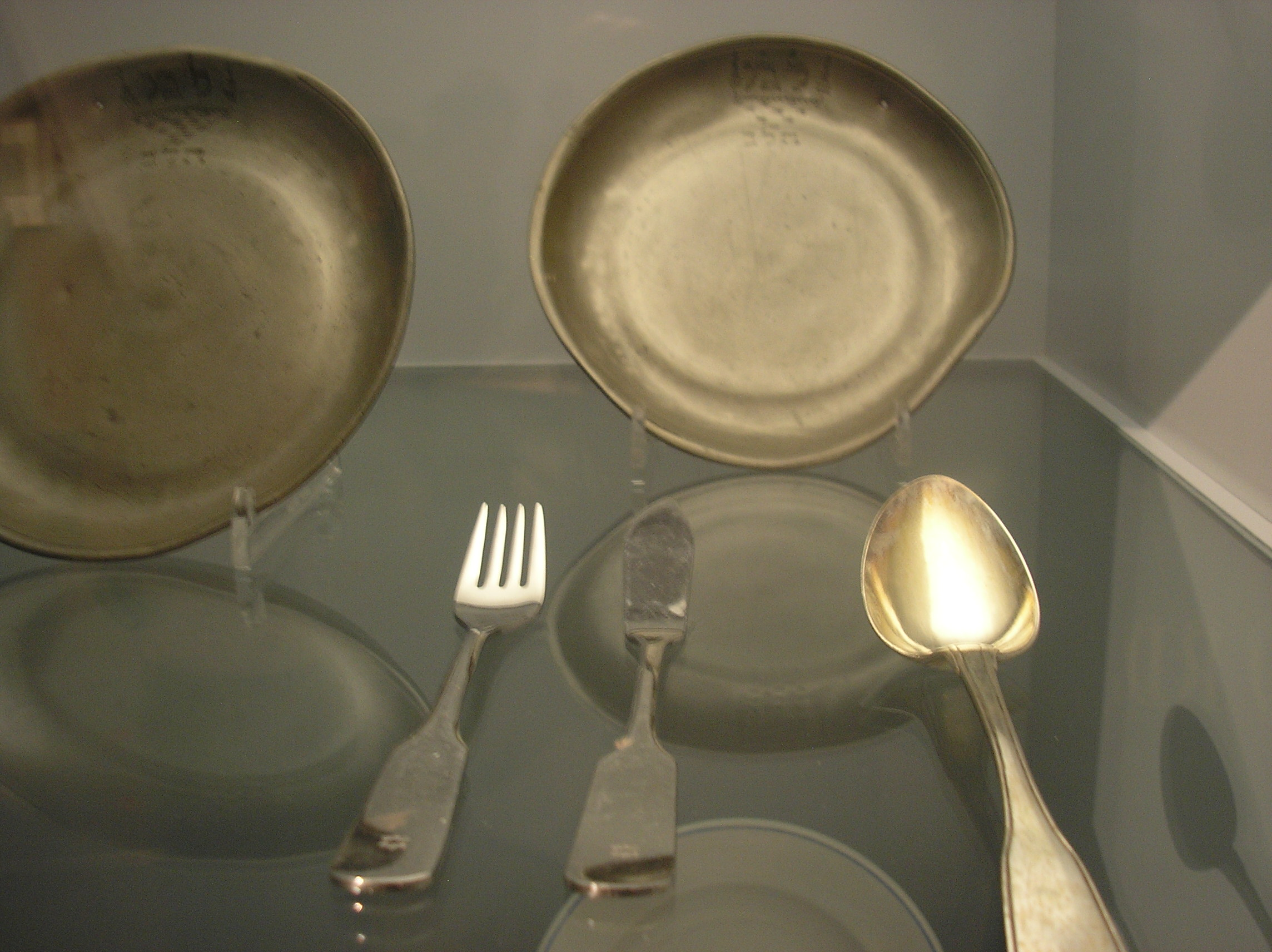
Kosher dairy dishes from the 19th century in the Jewish Museum, Berlin

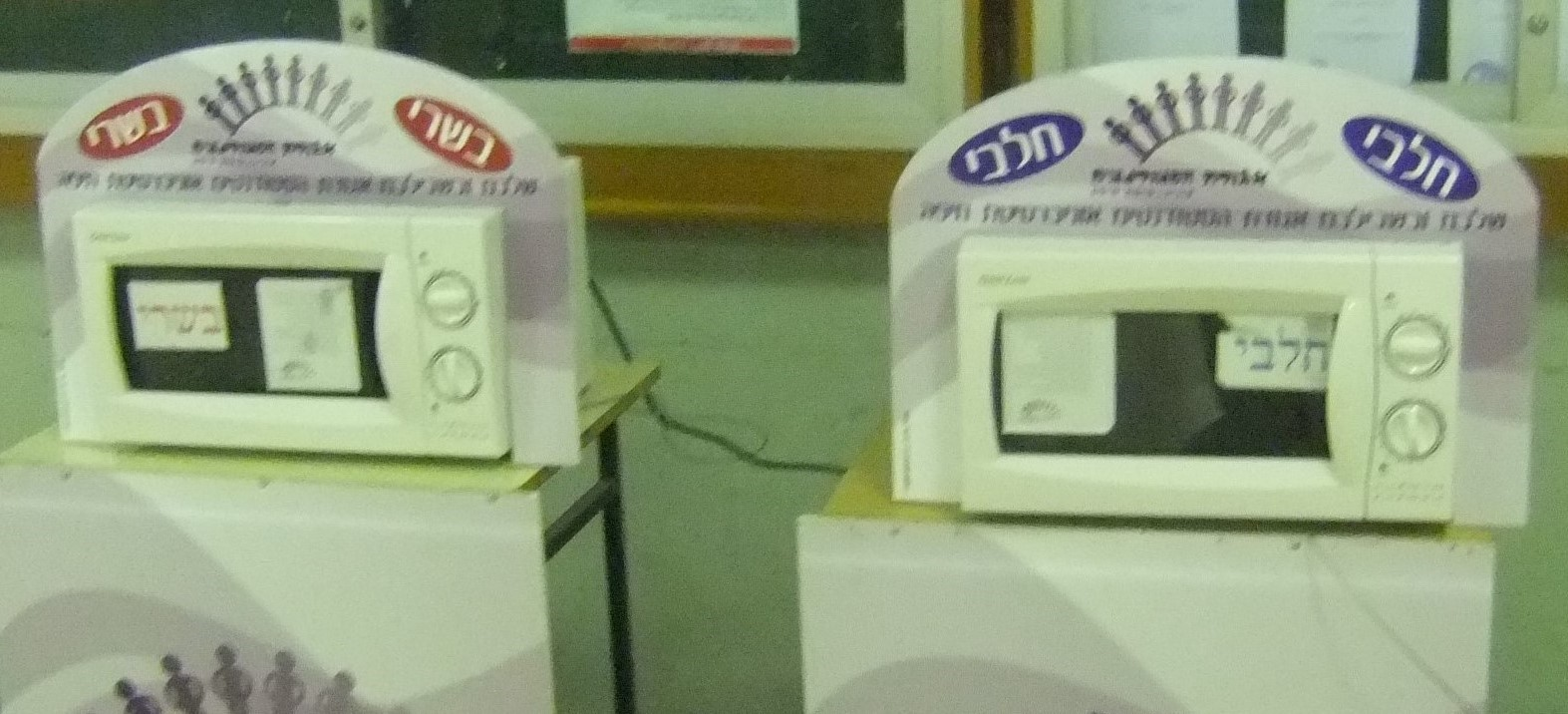
Two microwave ovens in Haifa University: blue for dairy and red for meat.

Samuel ben Meir, the Tosafist, argued that infused tastes could endure in a cooking vessel or utensil for up to 24 hours; his suggestion led to the principle, known as ben yomo (Hebrew: son of the day, בן יומו), that vessels and utensils should not be used to cook milk within 24 hours of being used to cook meat (and vice versa). Although, after 24 hours, some residual flavour may still reside in porous cooking vessels and utensils, some rabbis hold the opinion that such residue would become stale and fetid, hence only infusing taste for the worse (Hebrew: nosen taam lifgam, נותן טעם לפגם), which they do not regard as violating the ban against mixing the tastes of milk and meat.

Since parve food is reclassified if it takes on the flavour of meat or dairy produce, Ashkenazi Jews traditionally forbid eating parve contents of a pot that has been used within 24 hours to cook meat, if the parve contents would be eaten with dairy produce. Their tradition similarly forbids eating parve foods with meat if the cooking vessel was used to cook dairy produce within the previous 24 hours. According to Joseph Caro, the Sephardic tradition was more lenient about such things, but Moses Isserles argued that such leniency was unreliable.

Kashrut-observant Jews normally have two distinct sets of crockery and cutlery; one (called milchig in Yiddish and halavi in Hebrew) for food containing dairy products, and the other (fleishig or fleishedik in Yiddish and besari in Hebrew) for food containing meat.

Shelomo Dov Goitein wrote, “the dichotomy of the kitchen into a meat and a milk section, so basic in an observant Jewish household, is … never mentioned in the Geniza." Goitein said that in the early Middle Ages Jewish families kept only one set of cutlery and cooking ware. According to David C. Kraemer the practice of keeping separate sets of dishes developed only in the late 14th or 15th centuries. In earlier times, the household's one set of cooking ware was kashered between dairy and meat (and vice versa). Alternatively, users waited overnight for the meat or dairy gravy absorbed in a pot's walls to become insignificant (lifgam) before using the pot for the other species (meat or dairy).

== Sequential foods ==
Rashi stated that meat leaves a fatty residue in the throat and on the palate, and Maimonides noted that meat stuck between the teeth might not degrade for several hours. Feivel Cohen maintained that hard cheese leaves a lingering taste in the mouth. Generally, rabbinic literature considers the collective impact of each of these issues.

=== Eating dairy after meat ===
The Talmud reports that Mar Ukva, a respected rabbi, would not eat dairy after eating meat at the same meal, and had a father who would wait an entire day after eating meat before eating dairy produce. Jacob ben Meir speculated that Mar Ukva's behaviour was merely a personal choice, rather than an example he expected others to follow, but prominent rabbis of the Middle Ages argued that Mar Ukva's practice must be treated as a minimum standard of behaviour.

Maimonides argued that time was required between meat and dairy produce because meat can become stuck in the teeth, a problem he suggested would last for about six hours after eating it; this interpretation was shared by Solomon ben Aderet, a prominent pupil of his, and Asher ben Jehiel, who gained entry to the rabbinate by Solomon ben Aderet's approval, as well as by the later Shulchan Aruch. By contrast, tosafists argued that the key detail was just the avoidance of dairy produce appearing at the same meal as meat. Therefore, it was sufficient to just wait until a new meal—which to them simply meant clearing the table, reciting a particular blessing, and cleaning their mouths. Some later rabbinic writers, like Moses Isserles, and significant texts, like the Zohar (as noted by Vilna Gaon and Daniel Josiah Pinto), argued that a meal still did not qualify as new unless at least an hour had passed since the previous meal.

Since most Orthodox Sephardi Jews consider the Shulchan Aruch authoritative, they regard its suggestion of waiting six hours as mandatory. Ashkenazi Jews, however, have various customs. Orthodox Jews of Eastern European background who follow Minhag Polin usually wait for six hours, although those of German ancestry who follow Minhag Ashkenaz traditionally wait for only three hours, and those of Dutch ancestry have a tradition of waiting only for the one hour. The medieval tosafists stated that the practice does not apply to infants, but 18th and 19th-century rabbis, such as Abraham Danzig and Yechiel Michel Epstein, criticised those who followed lenient practices that were not traditional in their region. In the 20th century, many rabbis were in favor of leniency. Moses Stern ruled that all young children were excluded from these strictures, Obadiah Joseph made an exception for the ill, and Joseph Chaim Sonnenfeld exempted nursing women.

=== Eating meat after dairy ===
It has traditionally been considered less problematic to eat dairy products before meat, on the assumption that dairy products leave neither fatty residue in the throat, nor fragments between the teeth. Many 20th century Orthodox rabbis say that washing the mouth out between eating dairy and meat is sufficient. Some argue that there should also be recitation of a closing blessing before the meat is eaten, and others view this as unnecessary. Ashkenazi Jews following kabbalistic traditions, based on the Zohar, additionally ensure that about half an hour passes after consuming dairy produce before eating meat.

Some rabbis of the Middle Ages argued that after eating solid dairy products such as cheese, the hands should be washed. Shabbatai ben Meir even argues that this is necessary if utensils such as forks were used and the cheese never touched by hands. Other rabbis of that time, like Joseph Caro, thought that if it was possible to visually verify that hands were clean, then they need not be washed; Tzvi Hirsch Spira argued that washing the hands should also be practiced for milk.

Jacob ben Asher thought that washing the mouth was not sufficient to remove all residue of cheese, and suggested that eating some additional solid food is required to clean the mouth. Hard and aged cheese has long been rabbinically considered to need extra precaution, on the basis that it might have a much stronger and longer lasting taste; the risk of it leaving a fattier residue has more recently been raised as a concern. According to these rabbinic opinions, the same precautions (including a pause of up to six hours) apply to eating hard cheese before meat as apply to eating meat in a meal when the meat is eaten first. Judah ben Simeon, a 17th-century physician in Frankfurt, argued that hard cheese is not problematic if melted. Binyomin Forst argues that leniency is proper only for cooked cheese dishes and not dishes topped with cheese.

== Karaites ==
The Karaites, who reject the Talmud, permit mixing meat and dairy products as long as the meat and milk are from different species.

While it is generally banned for the Beta Israel community of Ethiopia to prepare general mixtures of meat and milk, poultry is not included in this prohibition. Since the movement of almost the entire Beta Israel community to Israel in the 1990s, the community has generally abandoned its old traditions and adopted the broad meat and milk ban followed by Rabbinical Judaism.

== Samaritans ==
In Exodus 23:19, the Samaritan Pentateuch adds the following passage after the prohibition: "כי עשה זאת כזבח שכח ועברה היא לאלהי יעקב", which translates to, "For he who does such as that is like a forbidden offering. And this is a transgression to God of Jacob".

Samaritans, whose religion is closely related to Judaism, do not eat meat with dairy, including poultry. They wait six hours after eating meat before eating dairy, and three hours after eating dairy before eating meat.

== Effects on Jewish cuisine ==
These restrictions remove certain dishes from Jewish cuisine, and induce alterations in others. For example, while traditional or authentic shawarma has lamb or beef with a yogurt sauce, in Israel, most shawarma is made with dark turkey meat and is commonly served with tahini sauce.

== See also ==
- Kil'ayim, other forbidden mixtures in Jewish law
- Jewish vegetarianism – Vegetarianism among followers of Judaism
- Jewish dairy restaurant – Type of generally lacto-ovo vegetarian/pescatarian kosher restaurant
