= Minhag Polin =

Minhag Polin is the Ashkenazi minhag of the Polish Jews, the Eastern branch of Nusach Ashkenaz, used in Eastern and Central Europe, the United States and by some Israeli Ashkenazim, particularly those who identify as "Lithuanian". It differs subtly, though significantly, from the German or Western branch of Nusach Ashkenaz, known in Hebrew as "Minhag Ashkenaz", used in Western and Central Europe.

Minhag Polin has historically been the most common minhag among Ashkenazim in Poland, eastern Germany, the Czech lands, Slovakia, Austria, Hungary, Belarus, Latvia, Lithuania, Romania, and Russia. Currently, there are a number of minor differences between the Israeli and American Ashkenazi practice, in that the Israeli practice follows some practices of the Vilna Gaon and certain practices which they adopted from Sephardim.

== Minhag Ashkenaz and Minhag Polin ==
The term "Minhag Ashkenaz" most specifically refers to the minhag of the Jews of Southern Germany. While its initial use was limited to the Rhineland, it subsequently spread throughout Alsace, Bavaria, the Netherlands, and Northern Italy with migrations of German Jews after the Crusades. North-Eastern German communities such as Hamburg regarded themselves as following Minhag Polin, though their musical tradition and pronunciation of Hebrew, and some of the traditions about the prayers included, were more reminiscent of the western communities than of Poland proper. Jews in Germany were historically divided into the "Bayers" of Bavaria and southern Germany, who followed the Minhag Ashkenaz, and the "Polanders" in northern Germany who followed Minhag Polin.

== History ==
Due to the large diaspora of Polish and Eastern European Jews who left Europe for the Americas, Israel, and elsewhere, Minhag Polin is the most common minhag found among Jews worldwide. Minhag Polin derives from Minhag Estraich, an earlier Ashkenazi rite developed by Jews in Austria. Ashkenazi Jews from the Western Europe emigrated to Poland and Eastern Europe in the sixteenth and seventeenth centuries, expanding the region of Minhag Estraich. Over time, as Jews moved further east, this minhag became known as Minhag Polin. After the appearance of Hasidic Judaism in the 18th century and the popularization of Kabbalah in Eastern Europe, the Minhag Polin evolved further to incorporate kabbalistic elements.

== See also ==
- History of the Jews in Germany
- History of the Jews in Poland
