= Val Taleggio =

Valley in Lombardy, Italy

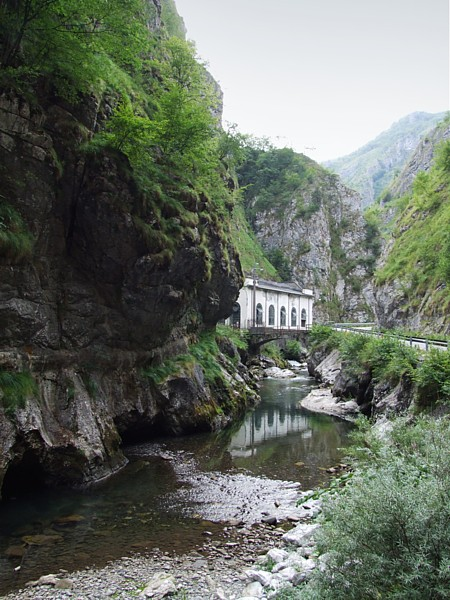
- The gorge of the Orrido della Val Taleggio

- Location within Lombardy

Geography
- Location: Comuni of Taleggio, Vedeseta and Morterone
- Coordinates: 45°53′N 9°36′E
- Rivers: Enna
- Interactive map of Val Taleggio

The Val Taleggio (Lecchese: Val Taegg, Bergamasque: Al Taècc) is an Alpine valley in the Italian region of Lombardy, split between the provinces of Bergamo and Lecco. It is a western fork of the Val Brembana which begins in the commune of San Giovanni Bianco, in the Province of Bergamo.

The valley's river is the Enna, which over the course of the centuries has gouged out a spectacular 3 km gorge between San Giovanni Bianco and Taleggio, known as the Orrido della Val Taleggio.

The valley is particularly known for the soft cows' milk cheeses which have been made here for centuries, including Taleggio and Strachí tunt (Strachitunt).

== Administrative divisions ==
The Val Taleggio comprises three communes:

- Taleggio (Province of Bergamo), with the frazioni
  - Sottochiesa (the seat of the Municipio);
  - Peghera;
  - Olda;
  - Pizzino;
- Vedeseta (Province of Bergamo), with the frazioni:
  - Avolasio;
  - Lavina;
  - Reggetto.
- Morterone (Province of Lecco)

== Road access ==
The Val Taleggio can be reached via three routes:

- From the Val Brembana, passing through the Orrido della Val Taleggio;
- From the Val Brembilla, passing through the communes of Brembilla and Gerosa and the Forcella di Bura mountain pass;
- From the Valsassina, via Moggio and the Culmine di San Pietro mountain pass.
