= Taleggio =

Taleggio may refer to:

- Taleggio, Lombardy, a comune in the province of Bergamo
- Val Taleggio, a valley mainly in the province of Bergamo
- Taleggio cheese, a cheese native to Val Taleggio
