= Substrate (chemistry) =

Entity in a chemical reaction

In chemistry, the term substrate is highly context-dependent. Broadly speaking, it can refer either to a chemical species being observed in a chemical reaction, or to a surface on which other chemical reactions or microscopy are performed. In biochemistry, an enzyme substrate is the molecule upon which an enzyme acts. In synthetic and organic chemistry a substrate is the chemical of interest that is being modified. A reactant is added to the substrate to generate a product through a chemical reaction. Otherwise, substrate may refer to a surface on which other chemical reactions are performed or a surface that plays a supporting role in various spectroscopic and microscopic techniques.

== Microscopy ==
In three of the most common nano-scale microscopy techniques, atomic force microscopy (AFM), scanning tunneling microscopy (STM), and transmission electron microscopy (TEM), a substrate is required for sample mounting. Substrates are often thin and relatively free of chemical features or defects. Typically silver, gold, or silicon wafers are used due to their ease of manufacturing and lack of interference in the microscopy data. Samples are deposited onto the substrate in fine layers where it can act as a solid support of reliable thickness and malleability. Smoothness of the substrate is especially important for these types of microscopy because they are sensitive to very small changes in sample height.

Various other substrates are used in specific cases to accommodate a wide variety of samples. Thermally-insulating substrates are required for AFM of graphite flakes for instance, and conductive substrates are required for TEM. In some contexts, the word substrate can be used to refer to the sample itself, rather than the solid support on which it is placed.

== Spectroscopy ==
Various spectroscopic techniques also require samples to be mounted on substrates, such as powder diffraction. This type of diffraction, which involves directing high-powered X-rays at powder samples to deduce crystal structures, is often performed with an amorphous substrate such that it does not interfere with the resulting data collection. Silicon substrates are also commonly used because of their cost-effective nature and relatively little data interference in X-ray collection.

Single-crystal substrates are useful in powder diffraction because they are distinguishable from the sample of interest in diffraction patterns by differentiating by phase.

== Atomic layer deposition ==
In atomic layer deposition, the substrate acts as an initial surface on which reagents can combine to precisely build up chemical structures. A wide variety of substrates are used depending on the reaction of interest, but they frequently bind the reagents with some affinity to allow sticking to the substrate.

The substrate is exposed to different reagents sequentially and washed in between to remove excess. A substrate is critical in this technique because the first layer needs a place to bind to such that it is not lost when exposed to the second or third set of reagents.

== Biochemistry ==
In biochemistry, the substrate is a molecule upon which an enzyme acts. Enzymes catalyze chemical reactions involving the substrate(s). In the case of a single substrate, the substrate bonds with the enzyme active site, and an enzyme-substrate complex is formed. The substrate is transformed into one or more products, which are then released from the active site. The active site is then free to accept another substrate molecule. In the case of more than one substrate, these may bind in a particular order to the active site, before reacting together to produce products. A substrate is called 'chromogenic' if it gives rise to a coloured product when acted on by an enzyme. In histological enzyme localization studies, the colored product of enzyme action can be viewed under a microscope, in thin sections of biological tissues. Similarly, a substrate is called 'fluorogenic' if it gives rise to a fluorescent product when acted on by an enzyme.

For example, curd formation (rennet coagulation) is a reaction that occurs upon adding the enzyme rennin to milk. In this reaction, the substrate is a milk protein (e.g., casein) and the enzyme is rennin. The products are two polypeptides that have been formed by the cleavage of the larger peptide substrate. Another example is the chemical decomposition of hydrogen peroxide carried out by the enzyme catalase. As enzymes are catalysts, they are not changed by the reactions they carry out. The substrate(s), however, is/are converted to product(s). Here, hydrogen peroxide is converted to water and oxygen gas.

E + S ⇌ ES → EP ⇌ E + P

- Where E is enzyme, S is substrate, and P is product

While the first (binding) and third (unbinding) steps are, in general, reversible, the middle step may be irreversible (as in the rennin and catalase reactions just mentioned) or reversible (e.g. many reactions in the glycolysis metabolic pathway).

By increasing the substrate concentration, the rate of reaction will increase due to the likelihood that the number of enzyme-substrate complexes will increase; this occurs until the enzyme concentration becomes the limiting factor.

=== Substrate promiscuity ===
Although enzymes are typically highly specific, some are able to perform catalysis on more than one substrate, a property termed enzyme promiscuity. An enzyme may have many native substrates and broad specificity (e.g. oxidation by cytochrome p450s) or it may have a single native substrate with a set of similar non-native substrates that it can catalyse at some lower rate. The substrates that a given enzyme may react with in vitro, in a laboratory setting, may not necessarily reflect the physiological, endogenous substrates of the enzyme's reactions in vivo. That is to say that enzymes do not necessarily perform all the reactions in the body that may be possible in the laboratory. For example, while fatty acid amide hydrolase (FAAH) can hydrolyze the endocannabinoids 2-arachidonoylglycerol (2-AG) and anandamide at comparable rates in vitro, genetic or pharmacological disruption of FAAH elevates anandamide but not 2-AG, suggesting that 2-AG is not an endogenous, in vivo substrate for FAAH. In another example, the N-acyl taurines (NATs) are observed to increase dramatically in FAAH-disrupted animals, but are actually poor in vitro FAAH substrates.

=== Sensitivity ===
Sensitive substrates, also known as sensitive index substrates, are drugs that demonstrate an increase in AUC of ≥5-fold with strong index inhibitors of a given metabolic pathway in clinical drug-drug interaction (DDI) studies.

Moderate sensitive substrates are drugs that demonstrate an increase in AUC of ≥2 to <5-fold with strong index inhibitors of a given metabolic pathway in clinical DDI studies.

==== Interaction between substrates ====
Metabolism by the same cytochrome P450 isozyme can result in several clinically significant drug-drug interactions.

== See also ==
- Limiting reagent
- Reaction progress kinetic analysis
- Solvent
