= San Giacomo Altarpiece (Palma Vecchio) =

Painting by Jacopo Palma il Vecchio

The San Giacomo Altarpiece is a 1515 oil on panel painting by Palma Vecchio which hangs in the church of San Giacomo Maggiore in the Peghera district of Taleggio, Lombardy. It is also known as Pietà with Saint James, Saint Sebastian and Saint Roch.

== History ==
The work was produced at an important moment in Palma's life. According to the artist scholar Philip Rylands it was made in 1515 when the artist moved to Venice. It was quite common in the 16th century that people from the small and poor villages of Bergamo valleys to move to Venice to improve their condition by working on trade in woolen cloths or in the many construction sites open in the lagoon city. It was often these people who, having enriched themselves, ordered works of art from the most important artists present in the city to offer as gifts to their places of origin to improve and enrich the furnishings of their small rural churches. It was also at this time that Lorenzo Lotto was present in Bergamo, and the Venetian would change the city's art by bringing there the Venetian Renaissance.

== Description ==
The polyptych, made up of seven wooden panels, develops on two orders, with a lunette cymatium in the upper part depicting God the Father crowning the image of the lower panel of His dead Son. The upper order presents on the left the image of Saint Ambrose, in the center Christ supported by an angel and on the right Saint Anthony the Abbot, depicted half-length. In the lower order there are the image of Saint Sebastian, in the central, Saint James the Great, and on the right the image of Saint Roch depicted in full bust.

== Restoration ==
The Carrara Academy of Bergamo requested the polyptych to be exhibited at the exhibition "Bergamo the other Venice" in 2001, from the church, after a minimum restoration work. The polyptych had already been the subject of readjustment over the centuries, in 1886 and 1906 by the painter Luigi Cavenaghi and in 1958 by Sandro Allegretti. The detachments of the painting were a consequence of the thinness of the tables, due to the very cold temperatures in Winter and mild in Summer. Thanks to Emanuela Daffra of the Superintendence of Cultural Heritage of Milan, the work was included in a restoration program and the tables were delivered to the Opificio delle Pietre Dure of Florence, which did a great restoration work, not only on the pictorial part but also in the whole wooden structure, which over time had deteriorated greatly. The polyptych was brought back as an altarpiece in the apse in the church of Peghera in 2009.

== Bibliography ==
- (in Italian) Giovanni Carlo Federico Villa, Palma il Vecchio-lo sguardo della Bellezza, Skira, 2005, ISBN 978-88-572-2851-8
- (in Italian) Angelo Piazzoli, Giovanni Carlo Federico Villa, Il Palma L'invenzione della Bellezza, Montichiari, Intese Grafiche S.r.l., 2014, p. 126.
