= Rhizomucor pusillus =

Scientific classification
- Kingdom: Fungi
- Division: Mucoromycota
- Class: Mucoromycetes
- Order: Mucorales
- Family: Lichtheimiaceae
- Genus: Rhizomucor
- Species: R. pusillus

Binomial name
- Rhizomucor pusillus (Lindt) Schipper

Species of fungus

Rhizomucor pusillus is a thermophilic filamentous fungus belonging to the family Lichtheimiaceae, within the order Mucorales. It is known for its role in various industrial applications, particularly in enzyme production and food fermentation, and has been studied for its safety and potential use in human consumption.

== Diversity and ecology ==
Rhizomucor pusillus belongs to the order Mucorales and the class Mucoromycetes. R. pusillus is a member of the phylum Mucoromycota (previously Zygomycota), which includes Rhizopus microsporus, R. oligosporus, and R. oryzae, fungi that have been used for centuries to produce tempeh from the fermentation of soybeans. The Mucorales order belongs to the early diverging ancient fungi and is characterized by rapidly growing mycelium and amorph structures formed in large quantities. The Rhizomucor genus can be recognized by a morphology intermediate between Rhizopus and Mucor. R. pusillus is a filamentous fungus that is known as a pioneer species in compost, quickly utilizing easily accessible substrates.

Currently, around 10 different Rhizomucor species are known, among which R. pusillus, R. miehei, and R. variabilis. R. pusillus can grow at temperatures between 40-70 °C and is known for its thermostable enzyme production. R. pusillus is predominantly found in geothermal places that create and produce heat, such as compost piles, garbage, or landfills.

== Applications in food industry ==
Fermentation has a long history of use in the preservation and production of foods like soy sauce, yogurt, and alcoholic beverages. With the current advances in technology, the cultivation of fungi, in the form of fungal biomass, can be used to produce protein- and fiber-rich ingredients for human consumption. A well-known example of fungal biomass is Quorn (produced via fermentation of Fusarium venenatum), which has been on the international market for decades as a meat replacer. Rhizomucor species have also emerged as a promising source for food applications. Both R. pusillus and R. miehei are reported to be used to produce milk-clotting enzymes for cheese manufacturing. Primarily R. miehei has been used for enzyme preparations by industrial biotechnology companies, such as Novozymes, in food. Furthermore, Rhizomucor species have been isolated from different starter cultures of typical Asian fermented food products.

== Safety ==
=== Toxicological evaluation ===
Studies have demonstrated that R. pusillus can be safely used to produce a novel mycoprotein through fermentation. R. pusillus used for the production of this mycoprotein cannot produce mycotoxins which are toxins produced by certain moulds (fungi) that can cause adverse health effects. The whole genome sequence of this strain was annotated and no genetic elements were found that share significant sequence homology with protein toxins, including the absence of mucoricin, an essential toxin in the pathogenesis of mucormycosis.

For foods containing novel proteins, potential allergenicity of the proteins is a key safety consideration. One such product is a fungal biomass obtained from the fermentation of Rhizomucor pusillus. Scaife et al (2024) concluded that based on in silico analyses and a literature review, the risk of allergenic cross-reactivity of R. pusillus is low.

=== Regulatory approval ===
A R. pusillus strain has obtained regulatory approvals for food use, including self-affirmed GRAS (Generally Recognized as Safe) status in the United States and novel food approval in Singapore.

== Roles in disease ==
Mucorales fungi, especially Mucor species, can lead to serious but rare fungal infections in humans, called mucormycosis. Mucormycosis is most commonly caused by Rhizopus or Mucor species, affects the sinuses or the lungs and causes symptoms like cough, nasal congestion, and fever. Although mucormycosis can be fatal, it occurs primarily in patients who are severely immunocompromised or with severe metabolic diseases. Mucorales do most frequently enter the body via the respiratory tract, through inhalation of spores. Spores may also enter the body through the gastrointestinal tract or directly through the skin in case of trauma, wounds, catheters, and contaminated surgical devices. Infections with Mucorales have remained extremely rare compared to their abundance in our daily life. Fungal spores are ubiquitous in the air and are inhaled regularly. It is highly improbable that healthy individuals are infected upon ingestion of fungi since the invasion occurs mainly through inhalation of spores, which can then germinate and grow in the host. There is no evidence of mucormycosis caused by ingestion of mycelium from fungi or foods containing fungi, as they are most often heat-inactivated, which kills vegetative cells and spores. Additionally, Rhizomucor species have been shown to cause less than 5% of mucormycoses cases. Mucoricin, an essential toxin in the pathogenesis of mucormycosis, is absent in R. pusillus.
