= Corna Imagna =

- Comune
- Comune di Corna Imagna
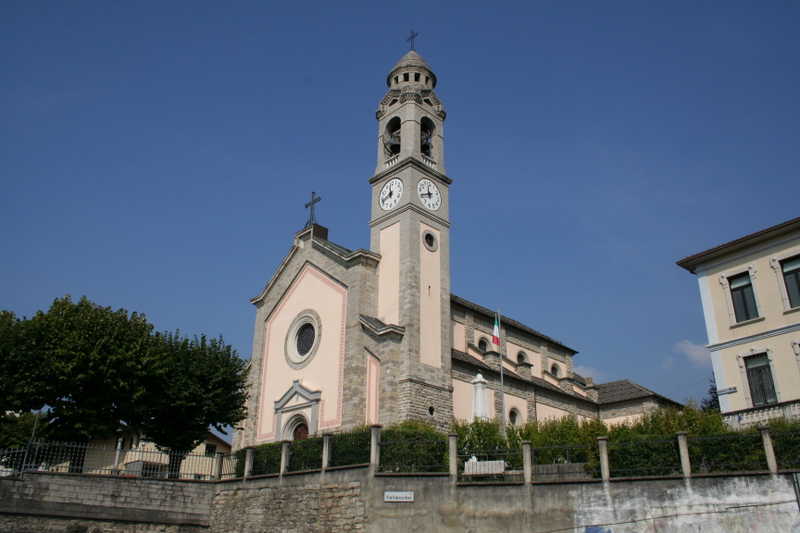
- Church

- Location within Italy Location within Lombardy
- Coordinates: 45°50′N 9°33′E
- Country: Italy
- Region: Lombardy
- Province: Province of Bergamo (BG)

Area
  - Total: 4.5 km^{2} (1.7 sq mi)
- Elevation: 736 m (2,415 ft)

Population (Dec. 2004)
  - Total: 968
  - Density: 220/km^{2} (560/sq mi)
- Demonym: Cornesi
- Time zone: UTC+1 (CET)
  - Summer (DST): UTC+2 (CEST)
- Postal code: 24030
- Dialing code: 035

Corna Imagna is a comune (municipality) in the Province of Bergamo in the Italian region of Lombardy, located about 50 kilometres (31 mi) northeast of Milan and about 15 kilometres (9 mi) northwest of Bergamo. As of 31 December 2004, it had a population of 968 and an area of 4.5 square kilometres (1.7 mi^{2}).

Corna Imagna borders the following municipalities: Blello, Brembilla, Fuipiano Valle Imagna, Gerosa, Locatello, Rota d'Imagna, Sant'Omobono Imagna.

== Demographic evolution ==
Historical population

Year	Pop.	±%
1861	710	—
1871	750	+5.6%
1881	845	+12.7%
1901	897	+6.2%
1911	904	+0.8%

Year	Pop.	±%
1921	882	−2.4%
1931	1,002	+13.6%
1936	563	−43.8%
1951	662	+17.6%
1961	589	−11.0%

Year	Pop.	±%
1971	572	−2.9%
1981	691	+20.8%
1991	795	+15.1%
2001	923	+16.1%

Source: Data from ISTAT
