= Rota d'Imagna =

- Comune
- Comune di Rota d'Imagna
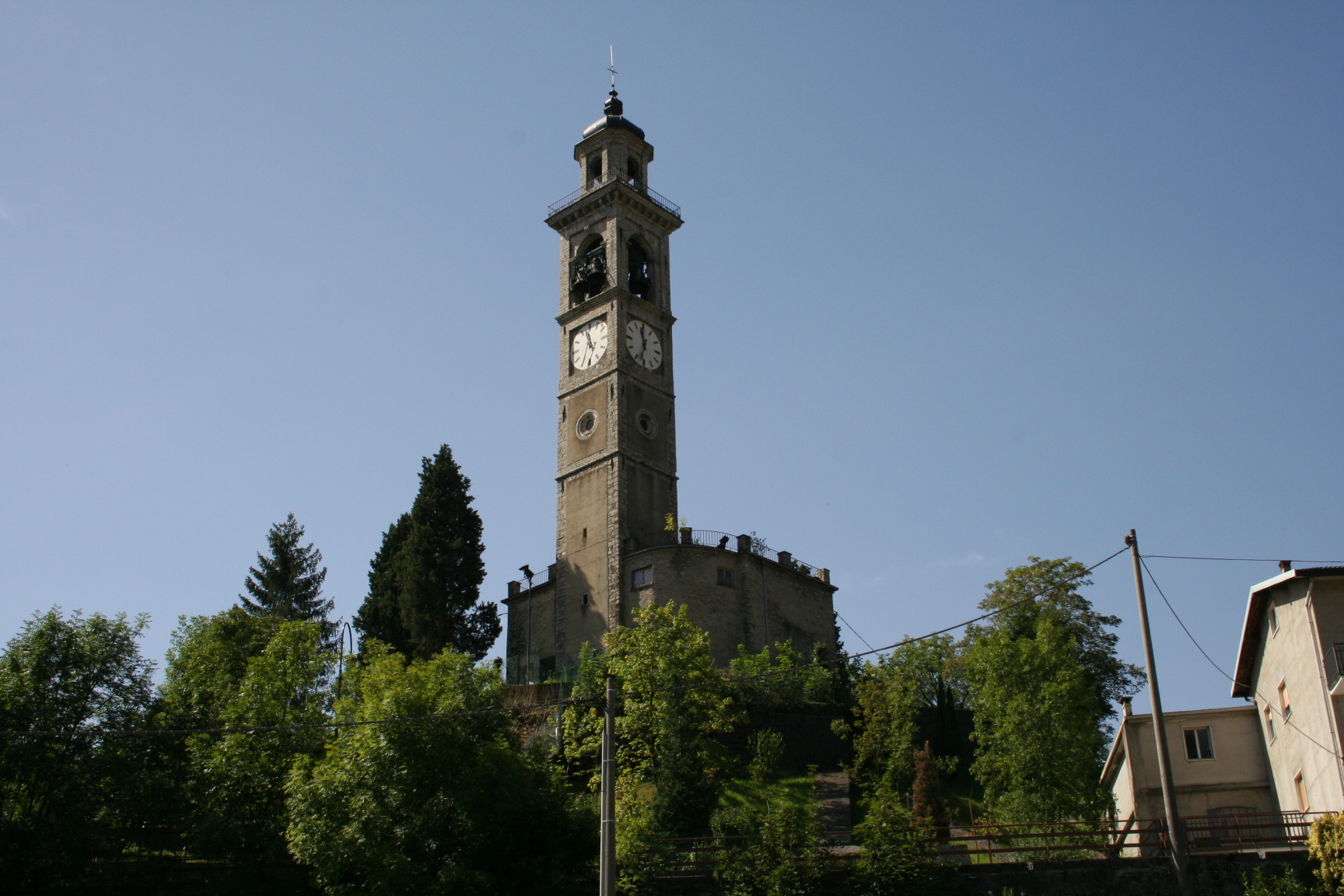
- Tower

- Location within Italy Location within Lombardy
- Coordinates: 45°50′N 9°31′E
- Country: Italy
- Region: Lombardy
- Province: Province of Bergamo (BG)

Area
  - Total: 6.0 km^{2} (2.3 sq mi)
- Elevation: 690 m (2,260 ft)

Population (Dec. 2004)
  - Total: 857
  - Density: 140/km^{2} (370/sq mi)
- Demonym: Rotaesi
- Time zone: UTC+1 (CET)
  - Summer (DST): UTC+2 (CEST)
- Postal code: 24037
- Dialing code: 035

Rota d'Imagna (Bergamasque: Röda) is a comune (municipality) in the Province of Bergamo in the Italian region of Lombardy, located about 50 kilometres (31 mi) northeast of Milan and about 20 kilometres (12 mi) northwest of Bergamo. As of 31 December 2004, it had a population of 857 and an area of 6.0 square kilometres (2.3 mi^{2}).

Rota d'Imagna borders the municipalities of Brumano, Corna Imagna, Locatello, Sant'Omobono Imagna, Valsecca.

== Tourism ==
Rota d’Imagna is considered the main tourism centre of the Imagna Valley because of its abundant and largely unspoilt natural landscape and spectacular mountain views. Offering various activities for different types of tourists, such as trekking, mountain walks, horse riding, relaxation in wellness centres and eno-gastronomic pleasures, Rota d’Imagna attracts many tourists from all over the world. The town is well known for providing sustainable tourism.

=== Attractions ===
The Church of Rota Fuori, dedicated to San Siro, is a major tourist attraction. It was built in 1496 and restructured in 1765, and it owns many art works of great significance including works of Gaetano Peverada, Pier Francesco Mazzucchelli and Carlo Ceresa together with other frescos and carvings dating back to the 17th century.

The Church of Rota Dentro, dedicated to San Gottardo, was built in 1496 and presents valuable granite portal and other significant art works.

Ca’ Piatone is a stately palace built in the 17th century, famous for being the birthplace of Giacomo Quarenghi, a well-known Italian architect.

== Demographic evolution ==
Historical population

Year	Pop.	±%
1861	1,010	—
1871	1,166	+15.4%
1881	1,272	+9.1%
1901	1,202	−5.5%
1911	1,297	+7.9%

Year	Pop.	±%
1921	1,391	+7.2%
1931	1,192	−14.3%
1936	917	−23.1%
1951	1,017	+10.9%
1961	950	−6.6%

Year	Pop.	±%
1971	825	−13.2%
1981	810	−1.8%
1991	815	+0.6%
2001	856	+5.0%

Source: Data from ISTAT
