= Fuipiano Valle Imagna =

- Comune
- Comune di Fuipiano Valle Imagna
- Location within Italy Location within Lombardy
- Coordinates: 45°51′N 9°32′E
- Country: Italy
- Region: Lombardy
- Province: Province of Bergamo (BG)

Area
  - Total: 4.2 km^{2} (1.6 sq mi)
- Elevation: 1,019 m (3,343 ft)

Population (Dec. 2004)
  - Total: 238
  - Density: 57/km^{2} (150/sq mi)
- Demonym: Fuipianesi
- Time zone: UTC+1 (CET)
  - Summer (DST): UTC+2 (CEST)
- Postal code: 24030
- Dialing code: 035

Fuipiano Valle Imagna (Bergamasque: Föipià) is a comune (municipality) in the Province of Bergamo in the Italian region of Lombardy, located about 50 kilometres (31 mi) northeast of Milan and about 20 kilometres (12 mi) northwest of Bergamo. On 30 November 2004, it had a population of 207 and an area of 4.2 square kilometres (1.6 mi^{2}).

Fuipiano Valle Imagna borders the following municipalities: Brumano, Corna Imagna, Gerosa, Locatello, Taleggio, Vedeseta.

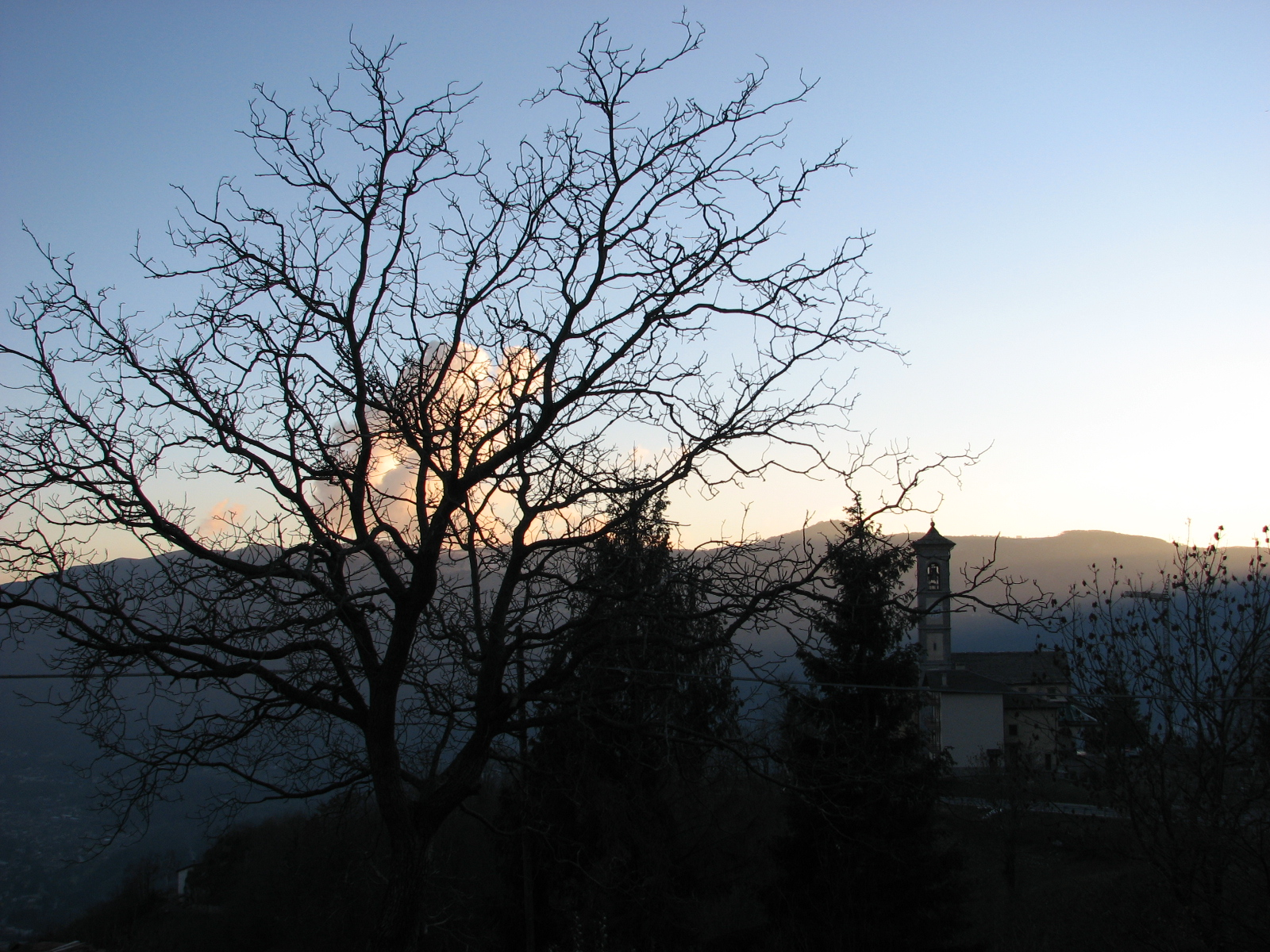
Setting

== Demographic evolution ==
Historical population

Year	Pop.	±%
1861	439	—
1871	245	−44.2%
1881	251	+2.4%
1901	290	+15.5%
1911	497	+71.4%

Year	Pop.	±%
1921	561	+12.9%
1931	635	+13.2%
1936	314	−50.6%
1951	331	+5.4%
1961	299	−9.7%

Year	Pop.	±%
1971	263	−12.0%
1981	260	−1.1%
1991	242	−6.9%
2001	230	−5.0%

Source: Data from ISTAT
