= Gerosa =

- Comune
- Comune di Gerosa
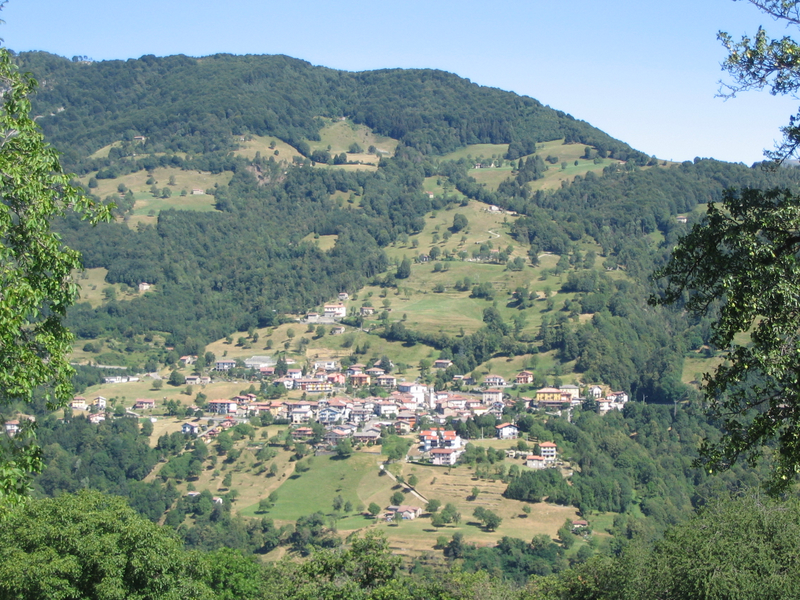
- Gerosa

- Location within Italy Location within Lombardy
- Coordinates: 45°51′N 9°34′E
- Country: Italy
- Region: Lombardy
- Province: Province of Bergamo (BG)

Area
  - Total: 10.1 km^{2} (3.9 sq mi)
- Elevation: 760 m (2,490 ft)

Population (Dec. 2004)
  - Total: 381
  - Density: 37.7/km^{2} (97.7/sq mi)
- Demonym: Gerosini
- Time zone: UTC+1 (CET)
  - Summer (DST): UTC+2 (CEST)
- Postal code: 24010
- Dialing code: 0345

Gerosa was a comune (municipality) in the Province of Bergamo in the Italian region of Lombardy, located about 50 kilometres (31 mi) northeast of Milan and about 20 kilometres (12 mi) northwest of Bergamo. As of 31 December 2004, it had a population of 381 and an area of 10.1 square kilometres (3.9 mi^{2}).

Gerosa bordered the following municipalities: Blello, Brembilla, Corna Imagna, Fuipiano Valle Imagna, San Giovanni Bianco, San Pellegrino Terme, Taleggio. In 2014 the municipality of Gerosa was merged with Brembilla and the new municipality is named Val Brembilla.

== Demographic evolution ==
Historical population

Year	Pop.	±%
1861	906	—
1871	856	−5.5%
1881	930	+8.6%
1901	862	−7.3%
1911	974	+13.0%

Year	Pop.	±%
1921	874	−10.3%
1931	804	−8.0%
1936	638	−20.6%
1951	666	+4.4%
1961	637	−4.4%

Year	Pop.	±%
1971	526	−17.4%
1981	449	−14.6%
1991	360	−19.8%
2001	383	+6.4%

Source: Data from ISTAT
