= Locatello =

- Comune
- Comune di Locatello
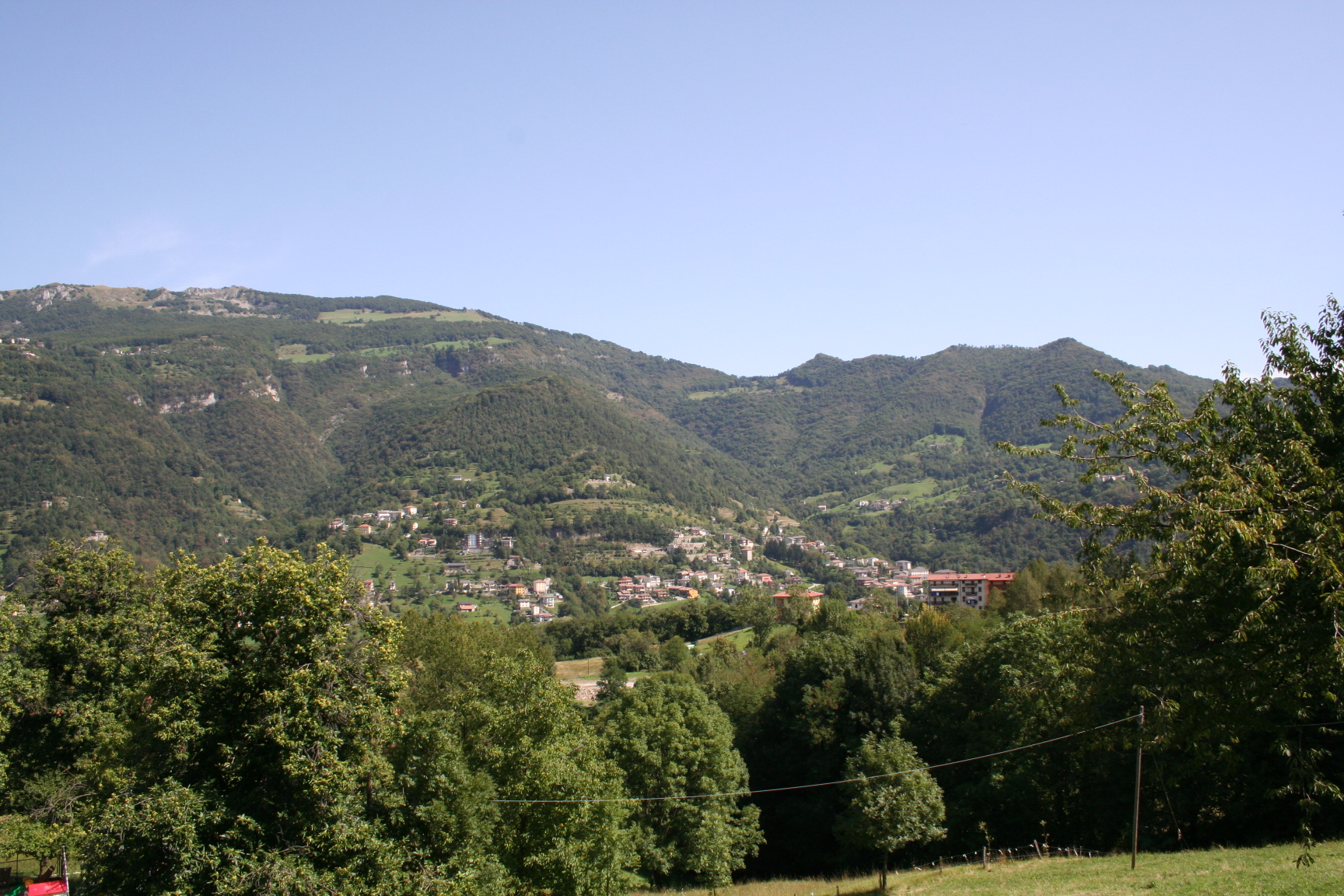
- Locatello

- Location within Italy Location within Lombardy
- Coordinates: 45°50′N 9°32′E
- Country: Italy
- Region: Lombardy
- Province: Province of Bergamo (BG)

Area
  - Total: 3.8 km^{2} (1.5 sq mi)
- Elevation: 557 m (1,827 ft)

Population (Dec. 2004)
  - Total: 785
  - Density: 210/km^{2} (540/sq mi)
- Demonym: Locatellesi (baeloch de locadel)
- Time zone: UTC+1 (CET)
  - Summer (DST): UTC+2 (CEST)
- Postal code: 24030
- Dialing code: 035

Locatello (Bergamasque: Locadèl) is a comune (municipality) in the Province of Bergamo in the Italian region of Lombardy, located about 50 kilometres (31 mi) northeast of Milan and about 20 kilometres (12 mi) northwest of Bergamo. As of 31 December 2004, it had a population of 785 and an area of 3.8 square kilometres (1.5 mi^{2}).

Locatello borders the following municipalities: Brumano, Corna Imagna, Fuipiano Valle Imagna, Rota d'Imagna.

== Demographic evolution ==
Historical population

Year	Pop.	±%
1861	685	—
1871	784	+14.5%
1881	882	+12.5%
1901	1,009	+14.4%
1911	947	−6.1%

Year	Pop.	±%
1921	1,217	+28.5%
1931	1,159	−4.8%
1936	715	−38.3%
1951	786	+9.9%
1961	762	−3.1%

Year	Pop.	±%
1971	648	−15.0%
1981	691	+6.6%
1991	681	−1.4%
2001	740	+8.7%

Source: Data from ISTAT
