= Rhizomucor =

Scientific classification
- Kingdom: Fungi
- Division: Mucoromycota
- Class: Mucoromycetes
- Order: Mucorales
- Family: Lichtheimiaceae
- Genus: Rhizomucor; Lucet & Costantin (1900)

Type species
- Rhizomucor parasiticus (Lucet & Costantin) Lucet & Costantin (1900)

Species
- R. endophyticus R. miehei R. pakistanicus R. pusillus R. tauricus R. variabilis

Genus of fungi

Rhizomucor is a genus of fungi in the family Lichtheimiaceae. The widespread genus contains six species. Rhizomucor parasiticus, the species originally selected as the type, is now considered synonymous with Rhizomucor pusillus.
