= Rhizopus delemar =

- Colony morphology of Rhizopus delemar

Scientific classification
- Kingdom: Fungi
- Division: Mucoromycota
- Class: Mucoromycetes
- Order: Mucorales
- Family: Mucoraceae
- Genus: Rhizopus
- Species: R. delemar

Binomial name
- Rhizopus delemar Hanzawa. 1912

Species of fungus

Rhizopus delemar is a species of fungus from the order Mucorales. The species is a saprophytic fungus found ubiquitously in the environment. The fungus grows rapidly and reproduces asexually through sporangiospores produced within sporangia.

R. delemar is an opportunistic pathogen and one of the fungi that cause mucormycosis, a severe infection primarily associted with people with weakened immune systems or certain metabolic disorders.

== Taxonomy ==
Rhizopus delemar and R. oryzae are closely related, morphologically similar fungi that were formerly classified under the same name. Researchers found that R. oryzae strains could be differentiated by their ability to produce organic acids, with one group producing lactic acid and the other producing fumaric and malic acid. Multilocus sequence analysis also found that these two strains formed distinct phylogenetic lineages. This led the researchers to designate the fumaric and malic acid producing strains as the separate species R. delemar.

== Description ==
=== Culture ===
On potato dextrose agar (PDA), colonies initially appear white and become gray to dark gray as spores are produced. When grown on agar, R. delemar quickly covers the surface of the plate. Colonies appear wooly or cotton candy-like.

=== Microscopic morphology ===
The hyphae of Rhizopus species are broad and largely aseptate. Root like structures, called rhizoids, are present where the stolons contact the substrate. The rhizoids are located where the sporangiophore meet the stolon.

== Disease ==
Rhizopus delemar can cause mucormycosis, especially in people with impaired immune systems or metabolic conditions that permit fungal growth. Infection can involve the sinuses, brain, lungs, skin, or other organs. Pulmonary infection is more commonly seen in patients with hematologic malignancies. Rhino-orbital-cerebral disease is particularly associated with diabetic ketoacidosis. Angioinvasion, or infection and invasion of the blood vessels, is a hallmark of severe mucormycosis.

== Virulence ==
=== Iron acquisition ===
Almost all living organisms, including fungi, require iron for growth. In the human body, iron is bound to carriers, such as transferrin, to minimize the toxic effects of free iron and sequester the element from microorganisms. R. delemar possesses two mechanisms to acquire iron from its host, an iron scavenging siderophore and through high affinity iron permeases.

Most fungi produce hydroxamate siderophores, whereas Mucorales produce a polycarboxylate siderophore called rhizoferrin.

Low environmental iron levels triggers the expression of high affinity iron uptake mechanisms.

=== Host-cell invasion ===
A major group of virulence factors of R. delemar are the spore coat protein homolog (CotH) family of proteins. CotH are surface proteins that interact with host cells. Several CotH proteins act as invasins, binding to receptors on human cells to promote internalization of the fungus. Different members of the CotH family interact with different host receptors depending on the site of infection.

=== Mucoricin ===
R. delemar produces mucoricin, a ricin-like toxin that contributes to host cell damage.
