= Brumano =

Comune in Lombardy, Italy

Brumano Brömà (Bergamasque)
- Comune
- Comune di Brumano
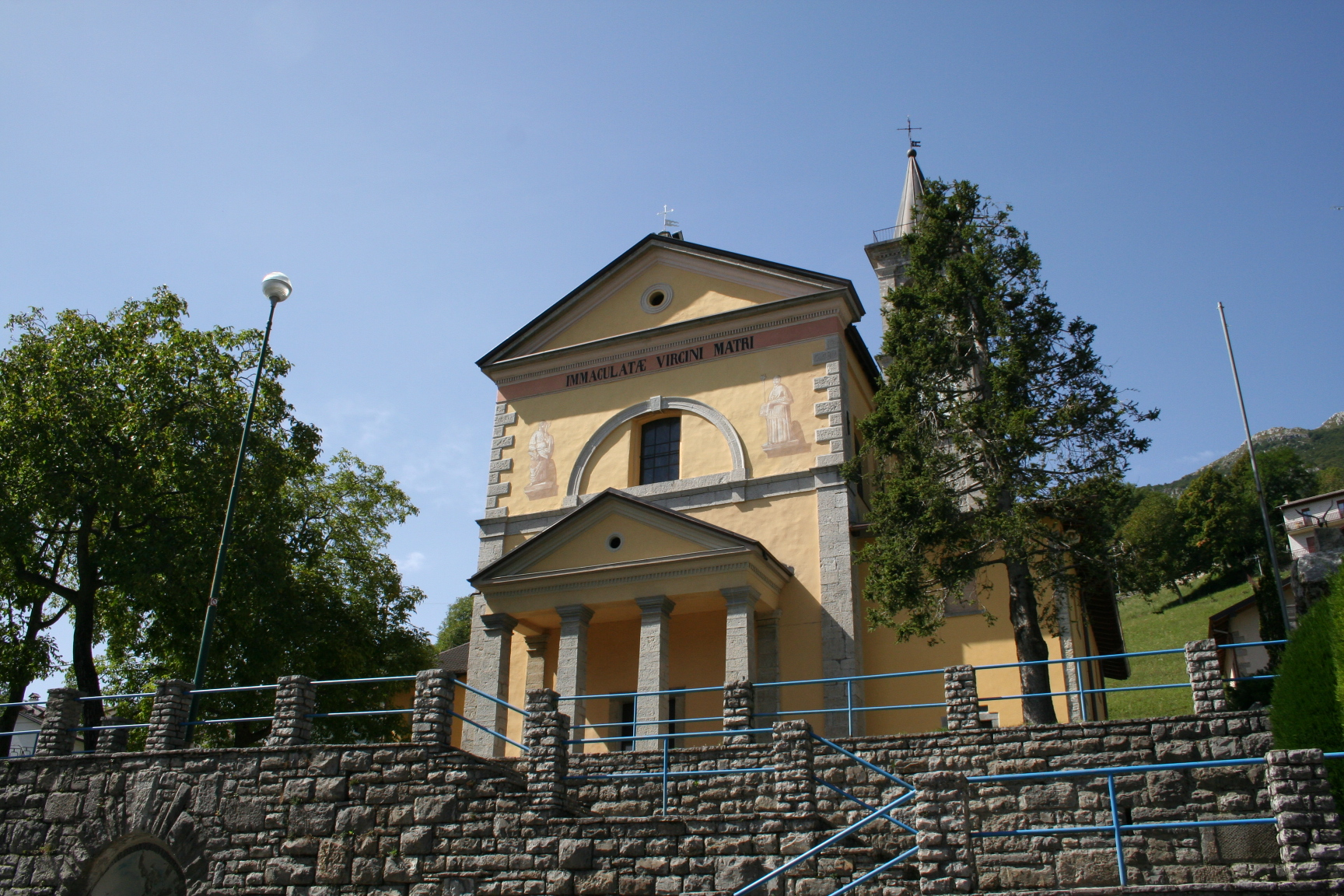
- Saint Bartholomew Church, Brumano

- Coat of arms

- Location within Italy Location within Lombardy
- Coordinates: 45°51′N 9°30′E
- Country: Italy
- Region: Lombardy
- Province: Province of Bergamo (BG)
- Frazioni: Ca' Dentro, Orso, Ca' Belardo, Premagnone, Cornelli, Palio

Area
  - Total: 8.14 km^{2} (3.14 sq mi)
- Elevation: 911 m (2,989 ft)

Population (2026)
  - Total: 135
  - Density: 16.6/km^{2} (43.0/sq mi)
- Demonym: Brumanesi
- Time zone: UTC+1 (CET)
  - Summer (DST): UTC+2 (CEST)
- Postal code: 24037
- Dialing code: 035
- Patron saint: San Bartolomeo
- Saint day: 24 August

Brumano (Bergamasque: Brömà) is a village and comune (municipality) in the Province of Bergamo in the region of Lombardy in Italy, located about 50 kilometres (31 mi) northeast of Milan and about 20 kilometres (12 mi) northwest of Bergamo. It has 135 inhabitants.

Brumano borders the municipalities of Erve, Fuipiano Valle Imagna, Lecco, Locatello, Morterone, Rota d'Imagna, Valsecca, and Vedeseta.

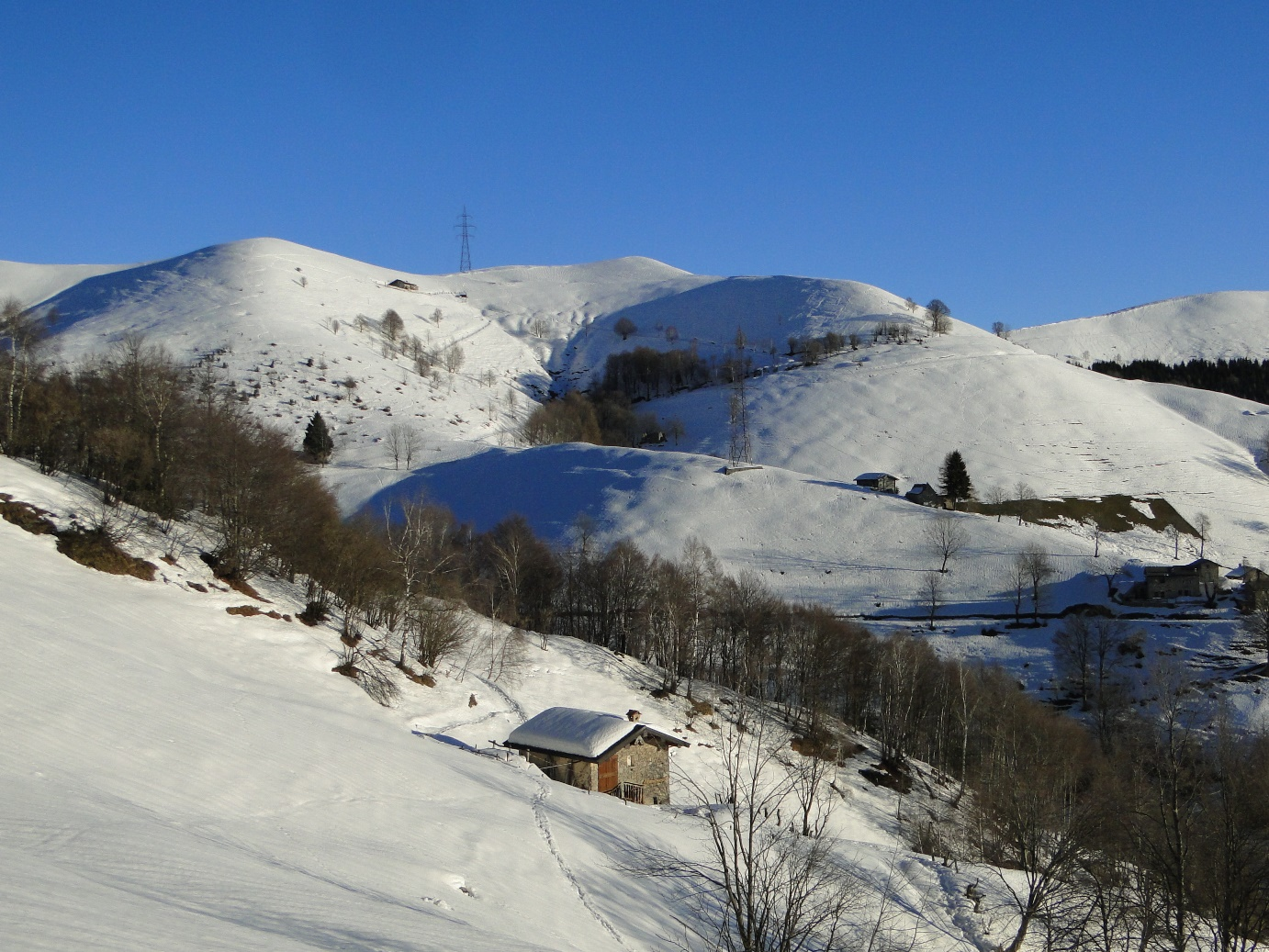
View of Brumano in the winter

== Demographics ==
As of 2026, the population is 135, of which 55.6% are male, and 44.4% are female. Minors make up 14.8% of the population, and seniors make up 30.4%. From 2011 to 2021, it grew the fastest out of all municipalities in the country.

Historical population

Year	Pop.	±%
1861	317	—
1871	258	−18.6%
1881	286	+10.9%
1901	246	−14.0%
1911	325	+32.1%
1921	230	−29.2%
1931	243	+5.7%
1936	214	−11.9%

Year	Pop.	±%
1951	238	+11.2%
1961	202	−15.1%
1971	105	−48.0%
1981	76	−27.6%
1991	78	+2.6%
2001	86	+10.3%
2011	95	+10.5%
2021	122	+28.4%

Source: ISTAT

=== Immigration ===
As of 2025, immigrants make up 7.4% of the total population. The foreign countries of birth are Morocco, Romania, the Czech Republic, France, Spain, and the United Kingdom.

== Twin towns – sister cities ==
Brumano is twinned with:

- Morterone, Italy (since 2007)
