= Taleggio cheese =

Italian cheese

Taleggio
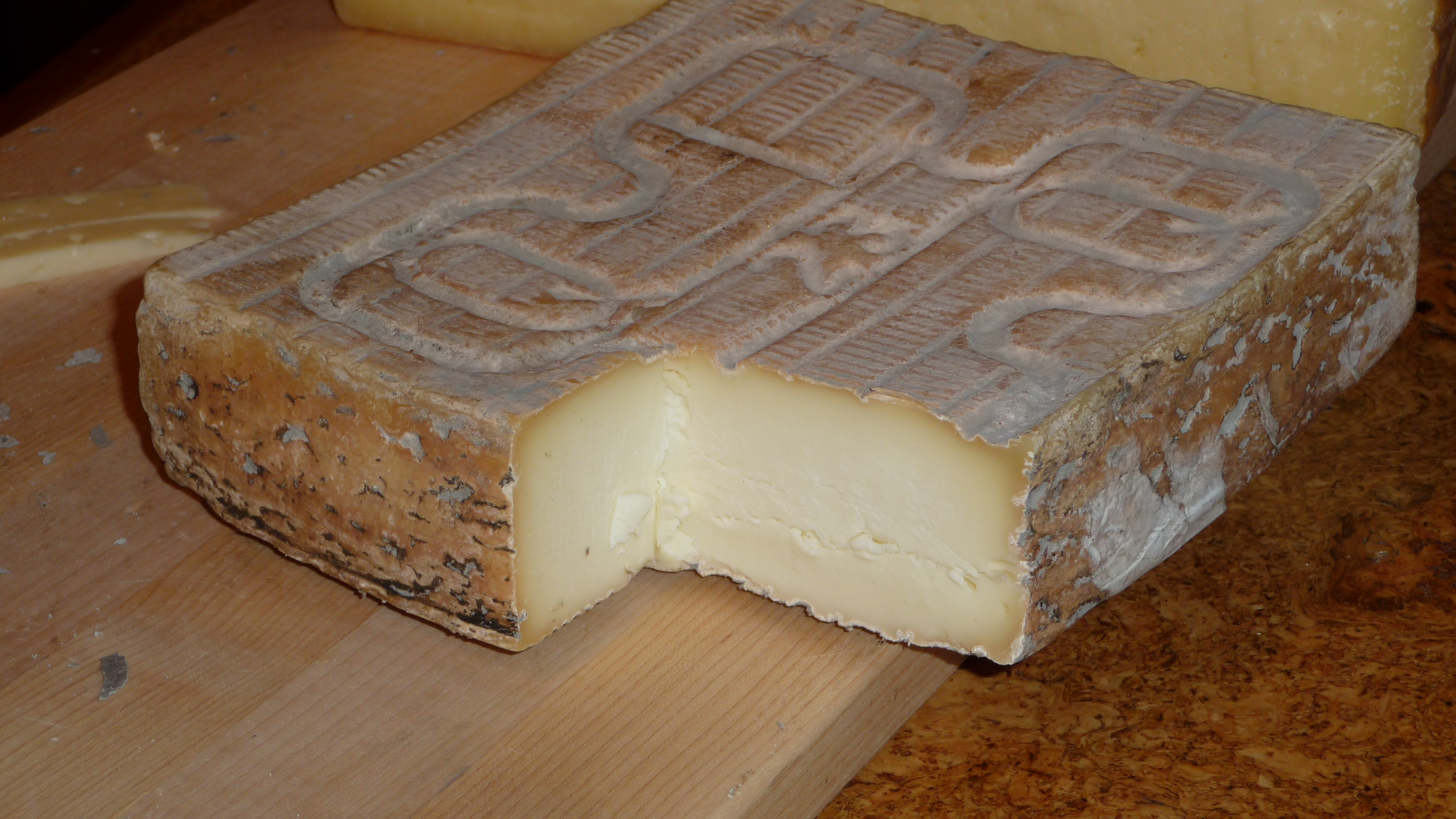
- Country of origin: Italy
- Region: Lombardy
- Town: Bergamo, Brescia, Como, Cremona, Lecco, Lodi, Milan, Pavia, Treviso, Novara
- Source of milk: cow, full milk
- Pasteurized: frequently
- Texture: semi-soft, smear-ripened
- Aging time: 40 days
- Certification: PDO

Taleggio (Italian: [taˈleddʒo]; Lombard: talegg, taegg or taècc) is a semisoft washed-rind Italian cheese named after Val Taleggio, Italy. The cheese has a thin, edible rind and a strong aroma, but its flavour is comparatively mild with an unusual fruity tang. The rind is a pinkish-brown, and the interior is creamy and pale yellow. It has a protected designation of origin so that only such cheese produced in the Lombardy or Piedmont regions of Italy may be designated as Taleggio.

== History ==
Taleggio and similar cheeses have been around since Roman times, with Cicero, Cato the Elder, and Pliny the Elder all mentioning it in their writings. The cheese was solely produced in the Val Taleggio until the late 1800s, when some production moved to the Lombardy plain to the south. After 1992, cheesemakers in Val Taleggio attempted to rename the cheese they produced as Taleggio del Val Taleggio ("Taleggio of Val Taleggio") to distinguish it from the more widely produced versions from nearby areas, but abandoned the attempt when they received legal caution against it, as the cheese already had a protected designation of origin.

== Production ==
The production takes place every autumn and winter. First, acidified milk is mixed with rennet taken from milk calves. The cheese is formed into square blocks and set on wood shelves in chambers, sometimes in caves as per tradition, and matures within six to ten weeks. It is washed once a week with a seawater sponge to prevent mould growth and to form an orange or rose crust. This smear-washing makes the cheese susceptible to contamination. Listeria developing on Taleggio is typically considered to be a post-manufacturing contamination, as the surface microflora are inhibitory to its development. The ripening cheese has been traditionally stored in caves near Valsassina, in which gentle breezes within spread the moulds growing in its rind.

Each square block is imprinted with a four-leaf brand representing the Consorzio Tutela Taleggio.

== Nutritional information ==
Taleggio
Fat content (in dry matter)	at least 48%	
Nutritional values (per 100 g (3 1/2 oz))	energy	1,319 kJ (315 kcal)
Nutritional values (per 100 g (3 1/2 oz))	protein	19 g
Nutritional values (per 100 g (3 1/2 oz))	fat	26 g
Nutritional values (per 100 g (3 1/2 oz))	calcium	433 mg
Nutritional values (per 100 g (3 1/2 oz))	phosphorus	328 mg
Nutritional values (per 100 g (3 1/2 oz))	vitamin A (retinol equivalent)	482 μg
Nutritional values (per 100 g (3 1/2 oz))	vitamin B_{2}	0.22 mg
Nutritional values (per 100 g (3 1/2 oz))	vitamin E	0.62 mg
Dimensions	18–20 cm (7–8 in) square, height: 4–7 cm (1 1/2–3 in)	
Weight	1.7–2.2 kg (3 lb 12 oz – 4 lb 14 oz)	

== See also ==
- List of Italian cheeses
