= Rhizomucor miehei =

Scientific classification
- Kingdom: Fungi
- Division: Mucoromycota
- Class: Mucoromycetes
- Order: Mucorales
- Family: Lichtheimiaceae
- Genus: Rhizomucor
- Species: R. miehei

Binomial name
- Rhizomucor miehei (Cooney & R. Emers.) Schipper

Species of fungus

Rhizomucor miehei (also: Mucor miehei) is a species of fungus. It is commercially used to produce enzymes which can be used to produce a microbial rennet to curd milk and produce cheese.

Under experimental conditions, this species grows particularly well at temperatures between 24 and 55°C, and their growth becomes negligible below 21°C or above 57°C.

It is also used to produce lipases for interesterification of fats.

== See also ==
- Industrial enzymes
