= Blello =

- Comune
- Comune di Blello
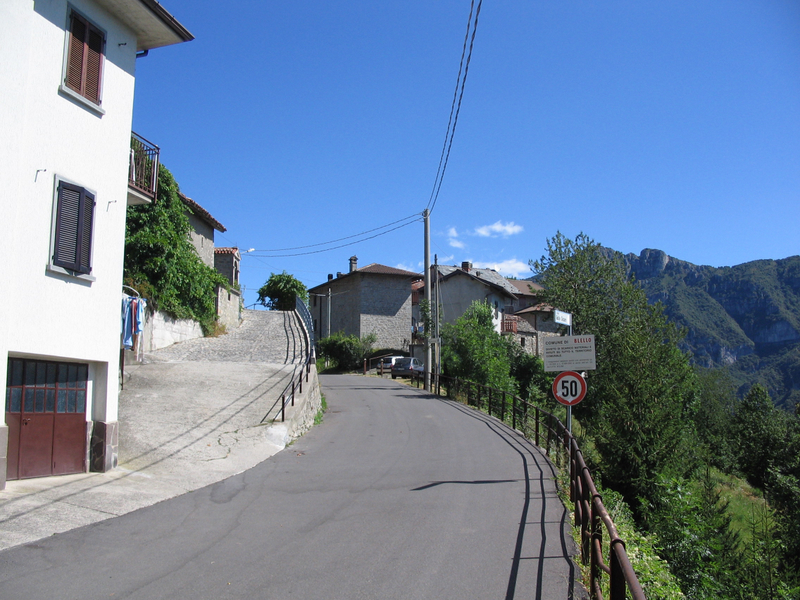
- Street in Blello

- Coat of arms

- Location within Italy Location within Lombardy
- Coordinates: 45°50′N 9°35′E
- Country: Italy
- Region: Lombardy
- Province: Province of Bergamo (BG)

Area
  - Total: 2.2 km^{2} (0.85 sq mi)
- Elevation: 815 m (2,674 ft)

Population (Dec. 2004)
  - Total: 91
  - Density: 41/km^{2} (110/sq mi)
- Demonym: Blellesi
- Time zone: UTC+1 (CET)
  - Summer (DST): UTC+2 (CEST)
- Postal code: 24012
- Dialing code: 0345

Blello (Bergamasque: Blèl) is a comune (municipality) in the Province of Bergamo in the Italian region of Lombardy, located about 50 kilometres (31 mi) northeast of Milan and about 15 kilometres (9 mi) northwest of Bergamo. As of 31 December 2004, it had a population of 91 and an area of 2.2 square kilometres (0.85 mi^{2}).

Blello borders the following municipalities: Brembilla, Corna Imagna, Gerosa.

== Demographic evolution ==
Historical population

Year	Pop.	±%
1861	171	—
1871	183	+7.0%
1881	178	−2.7%
1901	232	+30.3%
1911	236	+1.7%

Year	Pop.	±%
1921	242	+2.5%
1931	206	−14.9%
1936	146	−29.1%
1951	164	+12.3%
1961	126	−23.2%

Year	Pop.	±%
1971	105	−16.7%
1981	104	−1.0%
1991	106	+1.9%
2001	94	−11.3%

Source: Data from ISTAT
