= Val Brembilla =

- Comune
- Comune di Val Brembilla
- Coat of arms

- Val Brembilla in Bergamo

- Location within Italy Location within Lombardy
- Coordinates: 45°49′N 9°36′E
- Country: Italy
- Region: Lombardy
- Province: Province of Bergamo (BG)
- Frazioni: Sant' Antonio Abbandonato, Brembilla (town hall), Bura, Cadelfoglia, Case Fuori, Castignola, Catremerio, Cavaglia, Camorone, Cerro, Gerosa, Laxolo, Malentrata, San Pietro, Sant'Antonio Torre, Valmoresca, Zardino

Government
  - Mayor: Marcello Carminati (Brembilla nel Cuore)

Area
  - Total: 31.44 km^{2} (12.14 sq mi)
- Elevation: 425 m (1,394 ft)

Population (2017)
  - Total: 4,343
  - Density: 138.1/km^{2} (357.8/sq mi)
- Time zone: UTC+1 (CET)
  - Summer (DST): UTC+2 (CEST)
- Postal code: 24010-24012
- Dialing code: 0345
- Website: Official website
- created in 2014 from Brembilla and Gerosa

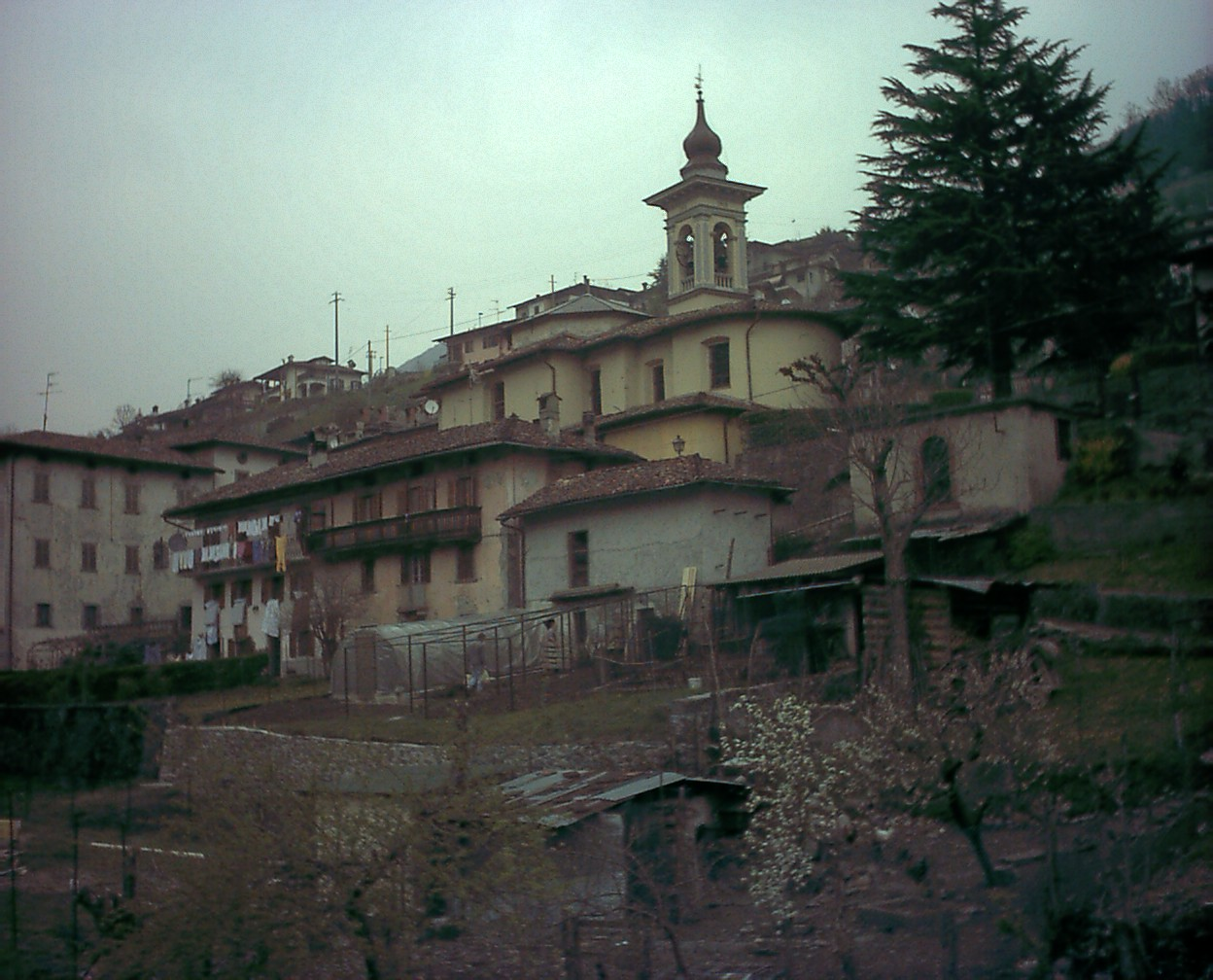
Cadelfoglia, a frazione of Val Brembilla.

Val Brembilla (Bergamasque: Al Brembila) is a comune in the province of Bergamo, in Lombardy. It was established by the regional council on 4 February 2014 from the fusion of the comuni di Brembilla and Gerosa. A referendum to create this comune was held on 1 December 2013. The referendum was passed with 77% yes and 23% no votes. The first municipal elections were held on 25 May 2014.
