= Brembilla =

- Comune
- Comune di Brembila
- Coat of arms

- Location within Italy Location within Lombardy
- Coordinates: 45°49′N 09°36′E
- Country: Italy
- Region: Lombardy
- Province: Bergamo (BG)

Government
  - Mayor: Ing. Damiano Zambelli

Area
  - Total: 20 km^{2} (7.7 sq mi)
- Highest elevation: 1,400 m (4,600 ft)
- Lowest elevation: 400 m (1,300 ft)

Population (2011)
  - Total: 4,162
  - Density: 210/km^{2} (540/sq mi)
- Demonym: Brembillesi
- Time zone: UTC+1 (CET)
  - Summer (DST): UTC+2 (CEST)
- Postal code: 24012
- Dialing code: 035
- Patron saint: St. Anthony of Padua
- Saint day: June 13

Brembilla was a comune in the province of Bergamo, in Lombardy, Italy. It was situated 15 km (9.3 mi) northwest of Bergamo. In 2014, the municipality of Gerosa was merged with Brembilla to create a new municipality, named Val Brembilla.

== Bounding communes ==
- Blello
- Gerosa
- San Pellegrino Terme
- Zogno
- Ubiale Clanezzo
- Capizzone
- Berbenno
- Sant'Omobono Imagna
- Corna Imagna

== Twin towns ==
Brembilla was twinned with:

- Nantua, France (2011)
