= Chymosin =

Class of enzymes

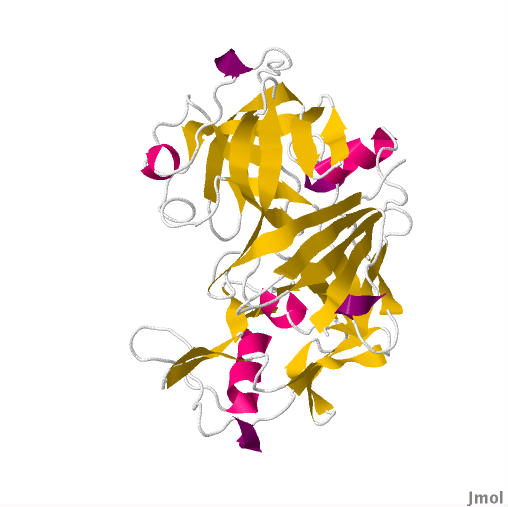
- Crystal structure of bovine chymosin complex with the inhibitor CP-113972.

Identifiers
- EC no.: 3.4.23.4
- CAS no.: 9001-98-3

Databases
- IntEnz: IntEnz view
- BRENDA: BRENDA entry
- ExPASy: NiceZyme view
- KEGG: KEGG entry
- MetaCyc: metabolic pathway
- PRIAM: profile
- PDB structures: RCSB PDB PDBe PDBsum
- Gene Ontology: AmiGO / QuickGO
Search
- PMC: articles
- PubMed: articles
- NCBI: proteins

Chymosin /ˈkaɪməsɪn/ or rennin /ˈrɛnɪn/ is a protease found in rennet. It is an aspartic endopeptidase belonging to MEROPS A1 family. It is produced by newborn ruminant animals in the lining of the abomasum to curdle the milk they ingest, allowing a longer residence in the bowels and better absorption. It is widely used in the production of cheese.

Historically, chymosin was obtained by extracting it from the stomachs of slaughtered calves. Today, most commercial chymosin used in cheese production is produced recombinantly in Escherichia coli, Aspergillus niger var. awamori, and Kluyveromyces lactis.

== Occurrence ==
Chymosin is found in a wide range of tetrapods, although it is best known to be produced by ruminant animals in the lining of the abomasum. Chymosin is produced by gastric chief cells in newborn mammals to curdle the milk they ingest, allowing a longer residence in the bowels and better absorption. Non-ruminant species that produce chymosin include pigs, cats, seals, and chicks.

One study reported finding a chymosin-like enzyme in some human infants, but others have failed to replicate this finding. Humans have a pseudogene for chymosin that does not generate a protein, found on chromosome 1. Humans have other proteins to digest milk, such as pepsin and lipase.

In addition to the primate lineage leading up to humans, some other mammals have also lost the chymosin gene.

== Enzymatic reaction ==
Chymosin is used to bring about the extensive precipitation and curd formation in cheese-making. The native substrate of chymosin is K-casein which is specifically cleaved at the peptide bond between amino acid residues 105 and 106, phenylalanine and methionine. The resultant product is calcium phosphocaseinate. When the specific linkage between the hydrophobic (para-casein) and hydrophilic (acidic glycopeptide) groups of casein is broken, the hydrophobic groups unite and form a 3D network that traps the aqueous phase of the milk.

Charge interactions between histidines on the kappa-casein and glutamates and aspartates of chymosin initiate enzyme binding to the substrate. When chymosin is not binding substrate, a beta-hairpin, sometimes referred to as "the flap," can hydrogen bond with the active site, therefore covering it and not allowing further binding of substrate.

== Examples ==
Listed below are the ruminant Cym gene and corresponding human pseudogene:

Chymosin [Precursor]
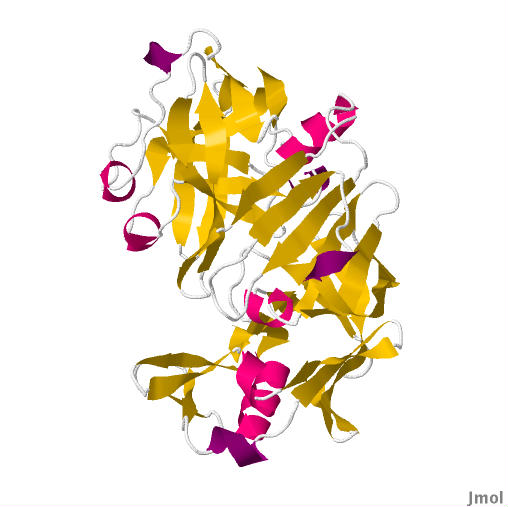
- X-ray analysis of calf chymosin

Identifiers
- Organism: Bos taurus
- Symbol: Cym
- Alt. symbols: CPC
- Entrez: 529879
- PDB: 4CMS
- UniProt: P00794
Search for
- Structures: Swiss-model
- Domains: InterPro

chymosin pseudogene (human)

Identifiers
- Symbol: CYMP
- NCBI gene: 643160
- HGNC: 2588
- OMIM: 118943
- RefSeq: NR_003599

Other data
- Locus: Chr. 1 p13.3

== Recombinant chymosin ==
Because of the imperfections and scarcity of microbial and animal rennets, producers sought replacements. With the development of genetic engineering, it became possible to extract rennet-producing genes from animal stomach and insert them into certain bacteria, fungi or yeasts to make them produce chymosin during fermentation. The genetically modified microorganism is killed after fermentation and chymosin is isolated from the fermentation broth, so that the fermentation-produced chymosin (FPC) used by cheese producers does not contain any GM component or ingredient. FPC contains the identical chymosin as the animal source, but produced in a more efficient way. FPC products have been on the market since 1990 and are considered the ideal milk-clotting enzyme.

FPC was the first artificially produced enzyme to be registered and allowed by the US Food and Drug Administration. In 1999, about 60% of US hard cheese was made with FPC and it has up to 80% of the global market share for rennet.

By 2008, approximately 80% to 90% of commercially made cheeses in the US and Britain were made using FPC. The most widely used fermentation-produced chymosin is produced either using the fungus Aspergillus niger or using Kluyveromyces lactis.

FPC contains only chymosin B, achieving a higher degree of purity compared with animal rennet. FPC can deliver several benefits to the cheese producer compared with animal or microbial rennet, such as higher production yield, better curd texture and reduced bitterness.
