= Morterone =

Morterone Murterun (Lombard)
- Comune
- Comune di Morterone
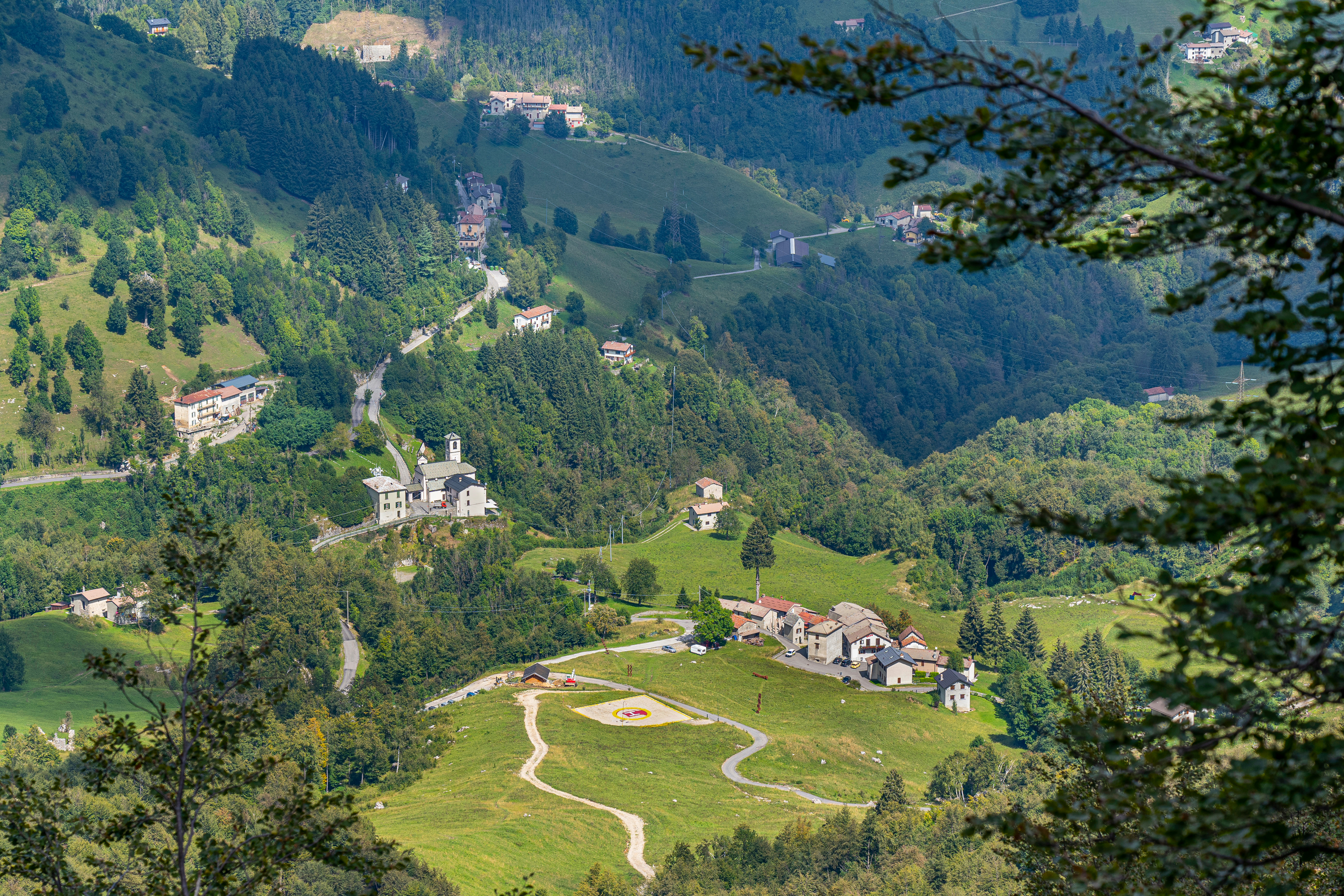
- Morterone

- Coat of arms

- Location within Italy Location within Lombardy
- Coordinates: 45°52′N 9°29′E
- Country: Italy
- Region: Lombardy
- Province: Lecco (LC)

Area
  - Total: 13.71 km^{2} (5.29 sq mi)
- Elevation: 1,070 m (3,510 ft)

Population (2026)
  - Total: 30
  - Density: 2.2/km^{2} (5.7/sq mi)
- Demonym: Morteronesi
- Time zone: UTC+1 (CET)
  - Summer (DST): UTC+2 (CEST)
- Postal code: 23811
- Dialing code: 0341

Morterone (Valassinese Lombard: Murterun) is a village and comune (municipality) in the Province of Lecco in the region of Lombardy in Italy, located about 50 kilometres (31 mi) northeast of Milan and about 7 kilometres (4 mi) northeast of Lecco. With a population of 30, it is the least populous municipality in Italy – in an area of 13.71 square kilometres (5.29 mi^{2}). For this record, it competes with the municipality of Pedesina, which in past years had even fewer inhabitants. In 2016, Morterone with its 32 residents became the smallest Italian municipality once again.

Morterone borders the municipalities of Ballabio, Brumano, Cassina Valsassina, Cremeno, Lecco, Moggio, and Vedeseta.

== Etymology ==
The name Morterone derives from the Latin mortarium (pond) or murtus (myrtle).

Since it lies on the eastern slope of Mount Resegone, in a lush and unspoilt natural basin surrounded by valleys, it would derive its Latin name mortarium (a wooden or stone bowl in which grass, roots, etc. were crushed), for others from mons, with reference to the pastures found there in large numbers.

== Geography ==
Morterone is situated at the foot of the Pizzo of the same name (a peak that is part of the Resegone), in an area of woods where you can walk along mountain paths. In an isolated position, from a hydrographic point of view it is part of the Taleggio valley (the stream that runs through it is a right tributary of the Enna stream).

=== Geology ===
The Morterone area is also an interesting karst area (caves, dolines, resurgences, gorges); more than forty cavities have been explored between the Morterone valley, the Remola valley and the Palio coast.

== Demographics ==
As of 2026, the population is 30, of which 60.0% are male, and 40.0% are female. Minors make up 13.3% of the population, and seniors make up 36.7%.

Historical population

Year	Pop.	±%
1861	397	—
1871	205	−48.4%
1881	197	−3.9%
1901	190	−3.6%
1911	346	+82.1%
1921	399	+15.3%
1931	385	−3.5%
1936	244	−36.6%

Year	Pop.	±%
1951	279	+14.3%
1961	118	−57.7%
1971	91	−22.9%
1981	37	−59.3%
1991	31	−16.2%
2001	33	+6.5%
2011	34	+3.0%
2021	31	−8.8%

Source: ISTAT

Short Term Population Change
Year	Surveying Date	Population	Change	%	Number of Families	Residents per Household
2001	31 December	33	-	-	-	-
2002	31 December	32	-1	-3,03%	-	-
2003	31 December	35	+3	+9,38%	18	1,94
2004	31 December	38	+3	+8,57%	22	1,73
2005	31 December	37	-1	-2,63%	21	1,76
2006	31 December	37	0	0,00%	22	1,68
2007	31 December	36	-1	-2,70%	22	1,64
2008	31 December	37	+1	+2,78%	23	1,61
2009	31 December	38	+1	+2,70%	23	1,65
2010	31 December	37	-1	-2,63%	24	1,54
2011	8 October	36	-1	-2,70%	24	1,50
2011	9 October	34	-2	-5,56%	-	-
2011	31 December	36	-1	-2,70%	26	1,38
2012	31 December	37	+1	+2,78%	26	1,42
2013	31 December	38	+1	+2,70%	27	1,41
2014	31 December	38	0	0,00%	28	1,36
2015	31 December	36	-2	-5,26%	26	1,38
2016	31 December	34	-2	-5,56%	24	1,42
2017	31 December	35	+1	+2,94%	25	1,40
2018	31 December	32	-3	-8,57%	-	-
2019	31 December	30	-2	-6,25%	-	-
2020	31 December	29	-1	-3,33%	-	-

=== Births and deaths ===
Year	Survey Dates	Births	Change	Deaths	Change	Natural population Change
2002	1 January-31 December	0	-	0	-	0
2003	1 January-31 December	0	0	0	0	0
2004	1 January-31 December	0	0	1	+1	-1
2005	1 January-31 December	0	0	0	-1	0
2006	1 January-31 December	0	0	0	0	0
2007	1 January-31 December	0	0	0	0	0
2008	1 January-31 December	0	0	1	+1	-1
2009	1 January-31 December	0	0	0	-1	0
2010	1 January-31 December	0	0	0	0	0
2011	1 January-8 October	0	0	0	0	0
2011	9 October-31 December	0	0	0	0	0
2011	1 January-31 December	0	0	0	0	0
2012	1 January-31 December	1	+1	0	0	+1
2013	1 January-31 December	0	-1	0	0	0
2014	1 January-31 December	1	+1	0	0	+1
2015	1 January-31 December	1	0	2	+2	-1
2016	1 January-31 December	0	-1	1	-1	-1
2017	1 January-31 December	0	0	0	-1	0
2018*	1 January-31 December	1	+1	1	+1	0
2019*	1 January-31 December	0	-1	2	+1	-2
2020*	1 January-31 December	1	+1	1	-1	0

== Politics ==
=== Elections ===
On 3 and 4 October 2021 the citizens of Morterone were called to the polls for the 2021 municipal elections. Mayor Dario Pesenti was elected.

Term		Winner	Party	Position	Notes
23 April 1995	13 June 1999	Giampietro Redaelli	Partito Popolare Italiano	Mayor	
13 June 1999	12 June 2004	Palmino Invernizzi	Partito Popolare Italiano	Mayor	
12 June 2004	7 June 2009	Giampietro Redaelli	lista civica	Mayor	
7 June 2009	4 October 2021	Antonella Invernizzi	lista civica	Mayor	
4 October 2021	In Office	Dario Pesenti	lista civica	Mayor	

== Municipality ==
=== Town Hall ===
The Town Hall of Morterone is located at Piazza chiesa, 1, 23811 within the town.

==== Hours ====
Opening Hours
Day	Opening Hours
Tuesday	14:30 - 19:30
Wednesday	9:00 - 12:30
Thursday	9:00 - 12:30
Saturday	9:00 - 12:00

=== Administration ===
==== ANAC compliance ====
The municipality has and has had multiple plans for ANAC Compliance. It consists of calls for contracts and tender and datasets for both 2020 and 2019.

==== Staffing ====
The Mayor, the Deputy Mayor and the Councillor of Morterone with the indication of the party they belong to or the political coalition at the time of the last municipal elections.

== Twin towns and sister cities ==
Morterone is twinned with:

- Brumano, Italy (2007)

== Bibliography ==
- Annalisa Borghese, Morterone, in Il territorio lariano e i suoi comuni, Milano, Editoriale del Drago, 1992, p. 322.
- Antonio Carminati e Costantino Locatelli, Morterone, sedici racconti di vita contadina sulle pendici del Resegone, 2007, No ISBN
