= Vedeseta =

Vedeseta Vedeséta
- Comune
- Comune di Vedeseta
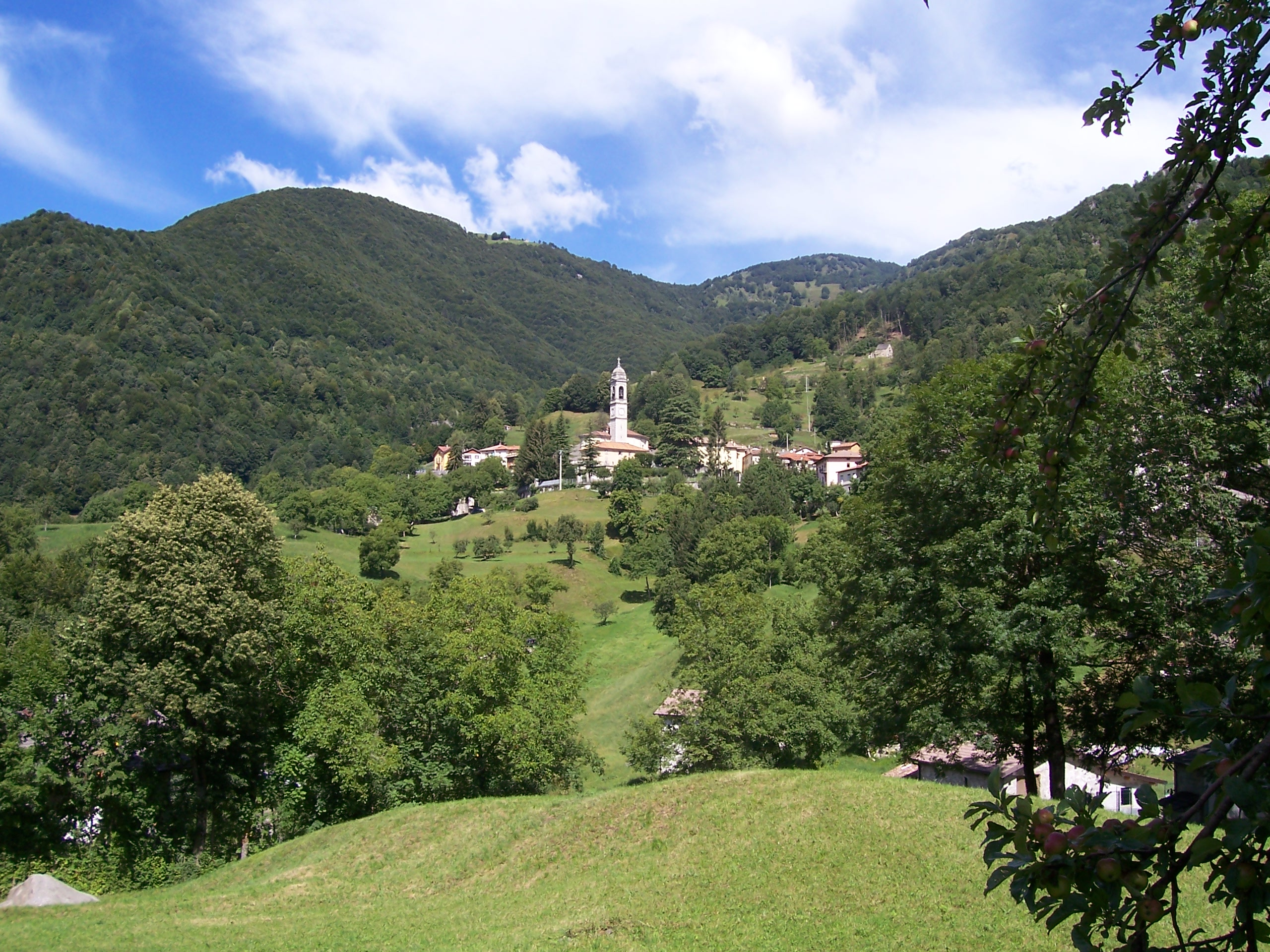
- Vedeseta

- Coat of arms

- Location within Italy Location within Lombardy
- Coordinates: 45°53′28″N 9°32′23″E
- Country: Italy
- Region: Lombardy
- Province: Province of Bergamo (BG)

Area
  - Total: 19.8 km^{2} (7.6 sq mi)
- Elevation: 820 m (2,690 ft)

Population (Dec. 2004)
  - Total: 244
  - Density: 12.3/km^{2} (31.9/sq mi)
- Demonym: Vedesetesi
- Time zone: UTC+1 (CET)
  - Summer (DST): UTC+2 (CEST)
- Postal code: 24010
- Dialing code: 0345

Vedeseta (Lombard: Vedeséta) is a comune (municipality) in the Province of Bergamo in the Italian region of Lombardy, located about 50 kilometres (31 mi) northeast of Milan and about 25 kilometres (16 mi) northwest of Bergamo. As of 31 December 2004, it had a population of 244 and an area of 19.8 square kilometres (7.6 mi^{2}).

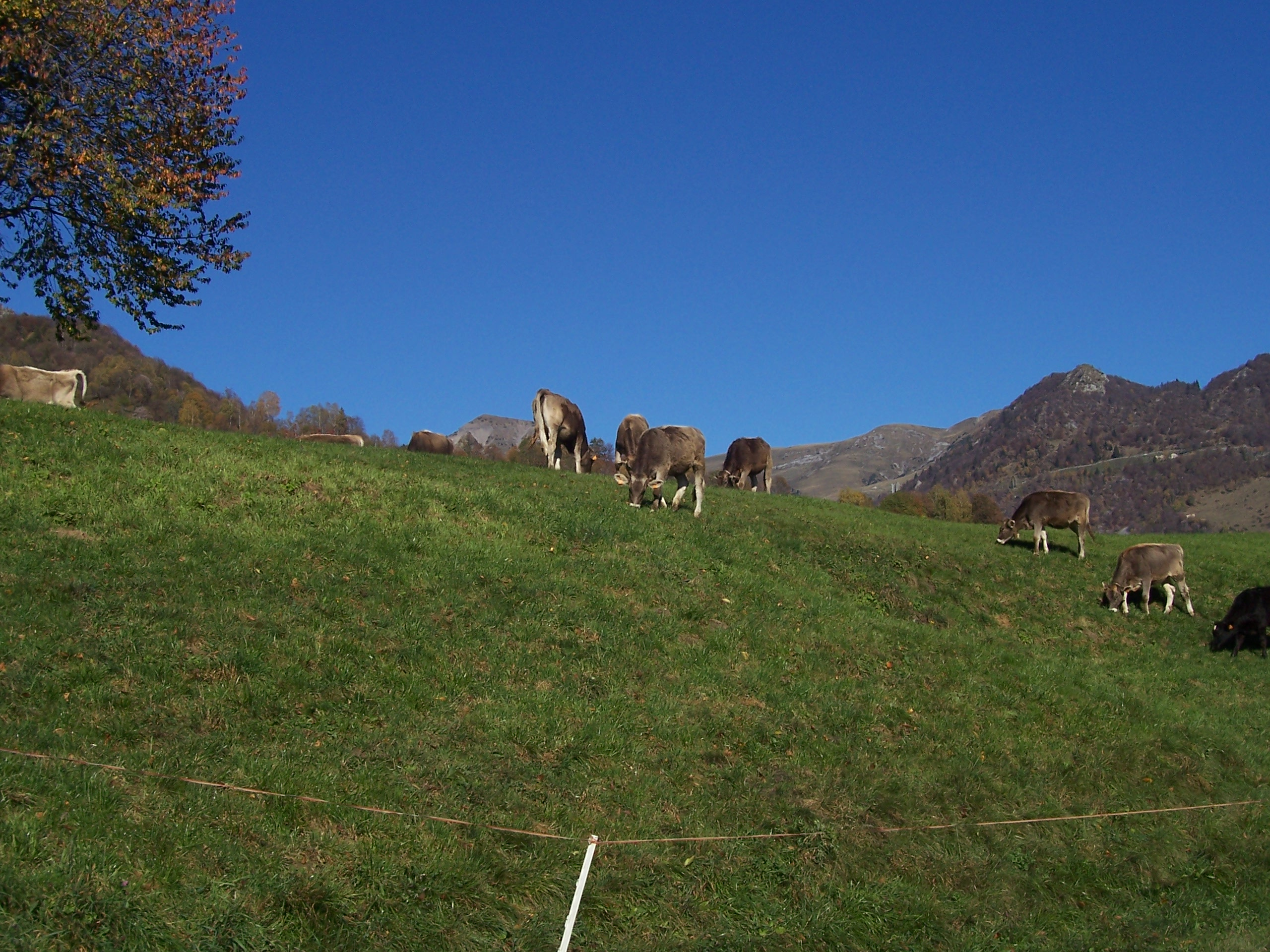
Cows grazing in Vedeseta

Vedeseta borders the following municipalities: Barzio, Brumano, Cassiglio, Fuipiano Valle Imagna, Moggio, Morterone, Taleggio, Valtorta.

== Demographic evolution ==
Historical population

Year	Pop.	±%
1861	616	—
1871	641	+4.1%
1881	679	+5.9%
1901	607	−10.6%
1911	739	+21.7%

Year	Pop.	±%
1921	766	+3.7%
1931	730	−4.7%
1936	616	−15.6%
1951	569	−7.6%
1961	503	−11.6%

Year	Pop.	±%
1971	421	−16.3%
1981	316	−24.9%
1991	297	−6.0%
2001	263	−11.4%

Source: Data from ISTAT
