= Valsassina =

Valley in the Italian Alps

Coordinates: 45.983°N 9.400°E

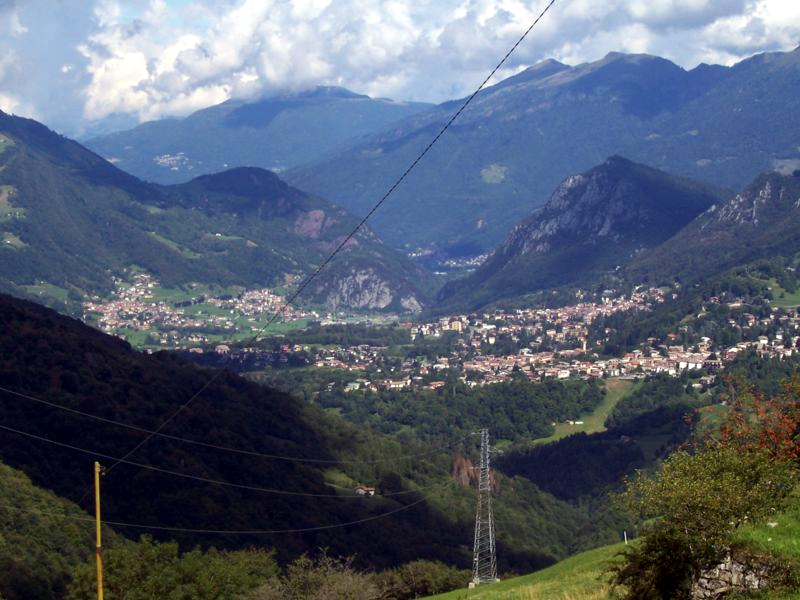
The Valsassina plateau

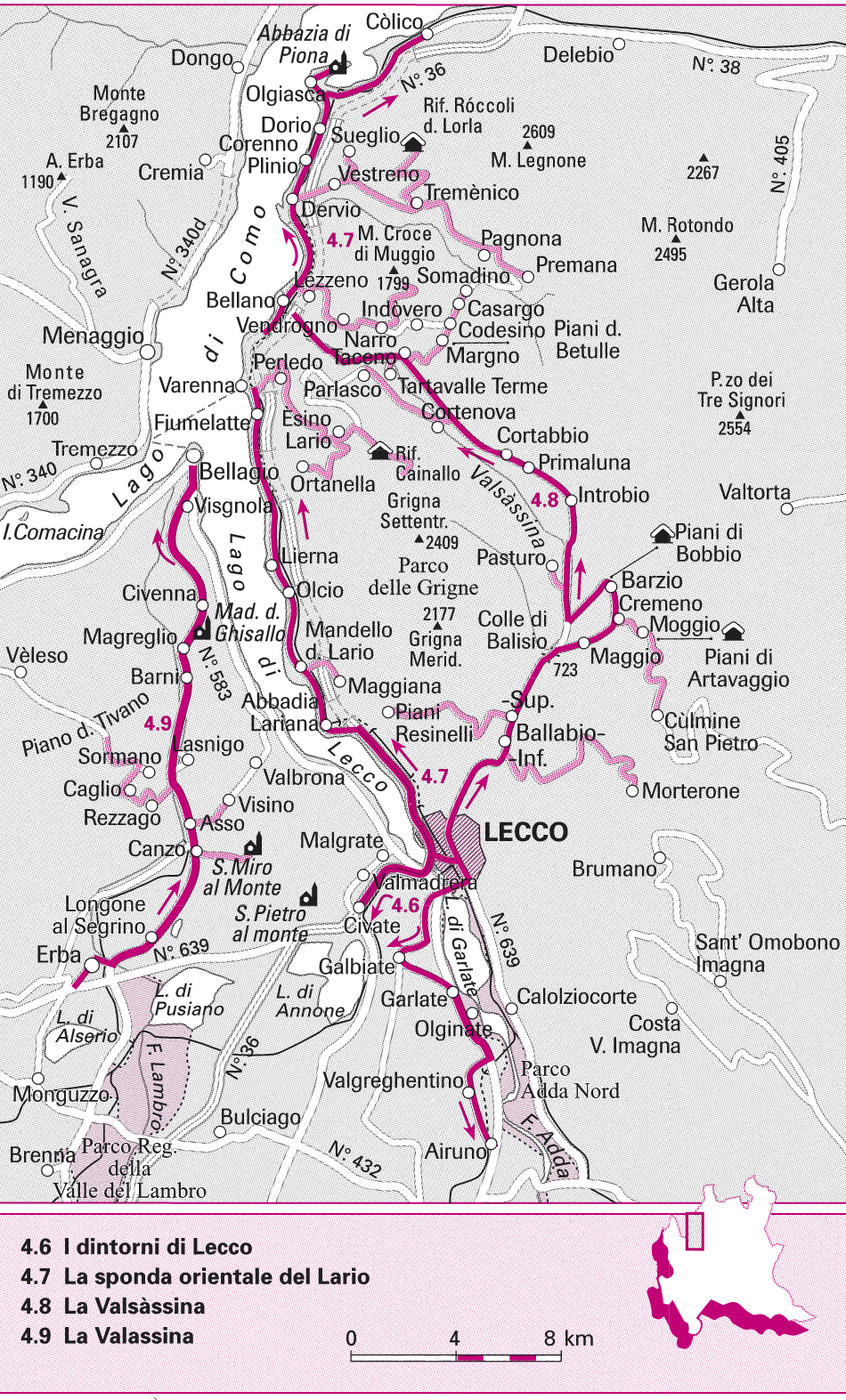
Map of the surroundings of Lecco, the eastern shore of Lake Como (Lario), the Valsassina and the Valassina

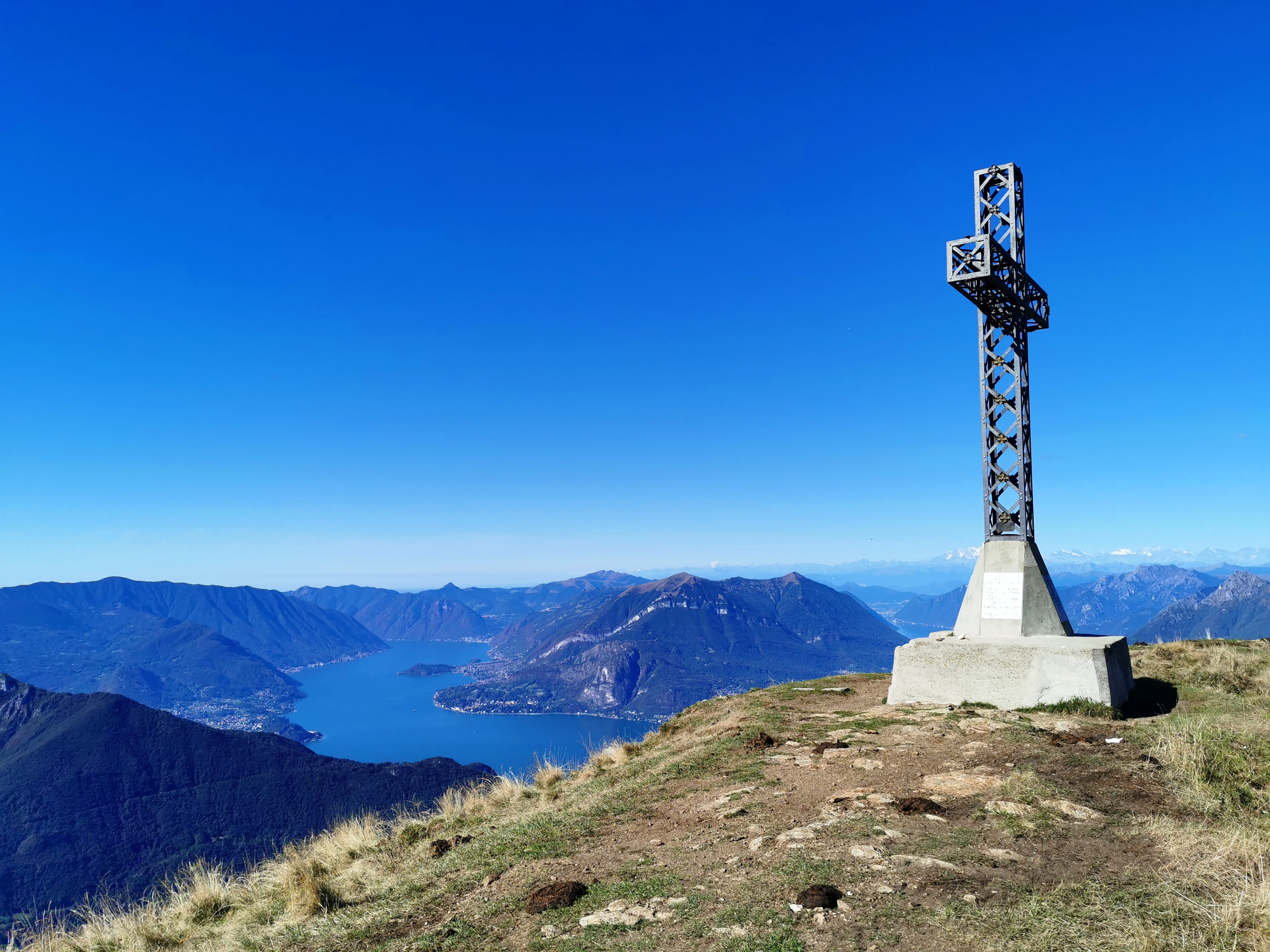
Alpe Giumello (Casargo): Lake Como, seen from Monte Croce di Muggio

Valsassina is a valley in the Alps of Lombardy, northern Italy, within the province of Lecco. It is included between the Grigna range from West, and the Bergamo Prealps which, in a half-circle stretching from North to East, separate it from the valley of the area of Bergamo and the Valtellina. Valsassina also reaches the Lecco's branch of Lake Como at Lecco itself and Bellano.

The valley is run by the Pioverna stream, which flows from the Grigne to the Lake Como. It's peculiar because it flows from south to north.

== Morphology ==
Valsassina is enclosed between the group of Grigne to the west, and the group of the Bergamo Alps, which, in a semi-circle from the east to the north, separates it from the valleys of Bergamo and Valtellina. It connects to the Lecco branch of Lake Como with two outlets, in Lecco and Bellano. The provincial road 64 Prealpina Orobica links the valley to the valleys of Bergamo. This road starts from the municipality of Moggio and then descends in the Val Taleggio. The Pioverna river runs across the entire valley. It originates from the Grigna Mountain massif, more precisely on the slopes of the Grigna Settentrionale. Its exact source is near the Bocchetta di Campione, at about 1,800-1,813 meters elevation. The river flows south to north across the valley, which is unusual for Alpine Rivers. Right at Bellano, the river flows into Lake Como and forms the famous Orrido di Bellano, which is a deep, narrow gorge carved by the water overtime.

== Cheese ==
The dairy production is the strength of the economy of Valsassina. The new cheesemakers have not forgotten the ancient livestock raising rules which provide, among other things, the summer transfer of herds on the pastures at higher altitudes. The milk produced is processed to derive undoubted quality cheeses such as Taleggio: a cheese with a square shape, with a thin crust and a uniform and compact paste. Ideal alone accompanied with pears, or to flavour other dishes. There are numerous dairy farms that produce the Taleggio cheese with goat cheese, the Robiola to quartirolo over the ricotta.
