= Mucoricin =

Fungal toxin

Identifiers
- Organism: Mucor velutinosus
- Symbol: RLT1
- Alt. symbols: ATC70_000941
- Entrez: 89944643
- Orthologs: NCBI: entry

Mucoricin is a protein toxin produced by fungi in the order Mucorales, the fungi that cause mucormycosis. It is a virulence factor that damages host tissues and interferes with the immune response during infection. The toxin has been most extensively studied in Rhizopus delemar. Mucoricin was named for its similarities to the plant toxin ricin, sharing structural features with the ricin B chain and the ability of the ricin A chain to inhibit host protein synthesis.

== Structure and activity ==
Mucoricin is a 17 kDa protein encoded by the RLT1 (ricin-like toxin 1) gene in R. delemar. It has structural and functional similarities to the plant toxin ricin. Unlike ricin, which consists of separate A and B chains, mucoricin is a single protein. Mucoricin has strong structural similarity to the lectin-binding B chain of ricin, which allows ricin to bind to sugars on the surface of host cells. It also has activity similar to the ricin A chain, which inhibits protein synthesis by inactivating ribosomes.

== Role in mucormycosis ==
Mucoricin contributes to the tissue damage and vascular dysfunction associated with mucormycosis. In mice, administration of purified mucoricin induced inflammation, hemorrhage, and tissue necrosis, while suppression of RLT1 in R. delemar reduced virulence.

Mucoricin is primarily associated with the hyphal stage of growth. While heat-killed fungal hyphae showed reduced activity, the resulting cytopathic damage to host cells is still significant, suggesting that the toxin is largely heat-stable. Additionally, purified mucoricin can also independently cause cellular damage.

Mucoricin also contributes to the interaction between Mucorales fungi and neutrophils, white blood cells that play an important role in controlling fungal infections. Normally, fungal germination triggers neutrophils to cluster at the site of infection. CR3 receptors on neutrophils recognize β-glucan residues found on the surface of fungi, inducing neutrophil release of reactive oxygen species (ROS) to control the fungal infection. Mucoricin released by Mucorales fungi selectively bind to β-glucan on the surface of the fungi, concentrating the toxin around the fungus, where it promotes neutrophil apoptosis and inhibits neutrophil swarming.

== Potential therapeutic target ==
Mucoricin has been investigated as a potential therapeutic target for mucormycosis. Antibodies against the toxin have been shown to reduce cellular damage and vascular permeability. Through computational screening a variety of candidate compounds were identified that showed interaction with mucoricin. A 2025 study showed that pteroic acid binds to mucoricin, which inhibited the activity of the recombinant mucoricin. This encourages a candidate for future studies and research regarding mucormycosis treatment to combat extreme fungal infections. Three other candidates were identified, but researchers were unable to identify binding in the surface plasmon of resonance experiments.
