= Moggio =

Moggio Mos (Lombard)
- Comune
- Comune di Moggio
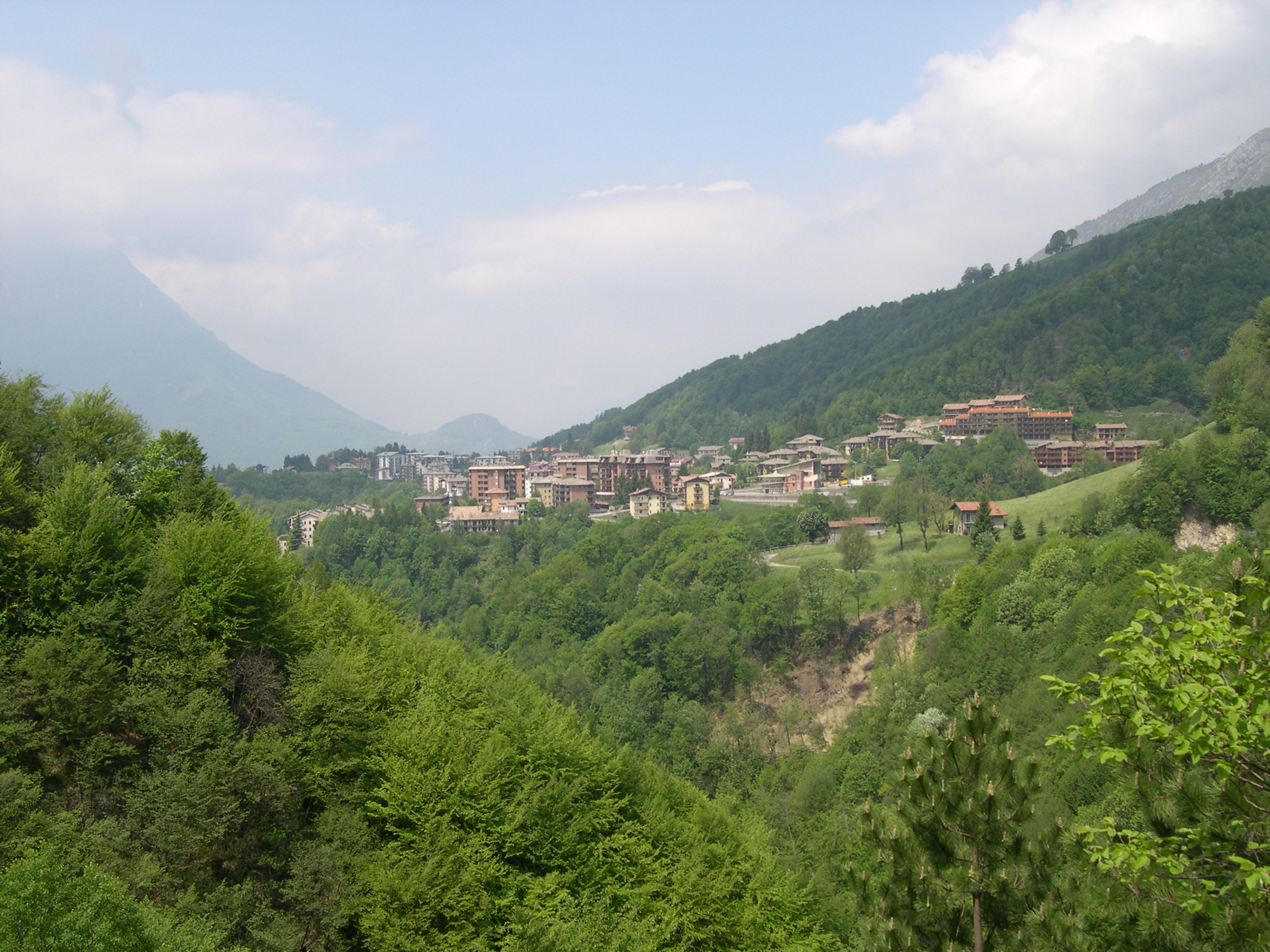
- Moggio

- Location within Italy Location within Lombardy
- Coordinates: 45°56′N 9°29′E
- Country: Italy
- Region: Lombardy
- Province: Lecco (LC)

Government
  - Mayor: Graziano Combi

Area
  - Total: 13.4 km^{2} (5.2 sq mi)
- Elevation: 890 m (2,920 ft)

Population (31 October 2017)
  - Total: 495
  - Density: 36.9/km^{2} (95.7/sq mi)
- Demonym: Moggesi
- Time zone: UTC+1 (CET)
  - Summer (DST): UTC+2 (CEST)
- Postal code: 23817
- Dialing code: 0341
- Website: Official website

Moggio (Valassinese Lombard: Mos) is a comune (municipality) in the Province of Lecco in the Italian region Lombardy, located about 60 kilometres (37 mi) northeast of Milan, and about 11 kilometres (7 mi) northeast of Lecco.

Moggio borders the following municipalities: Barzio, Cassina Valsassina, Morterone, Taleggio, and Vedeseta.

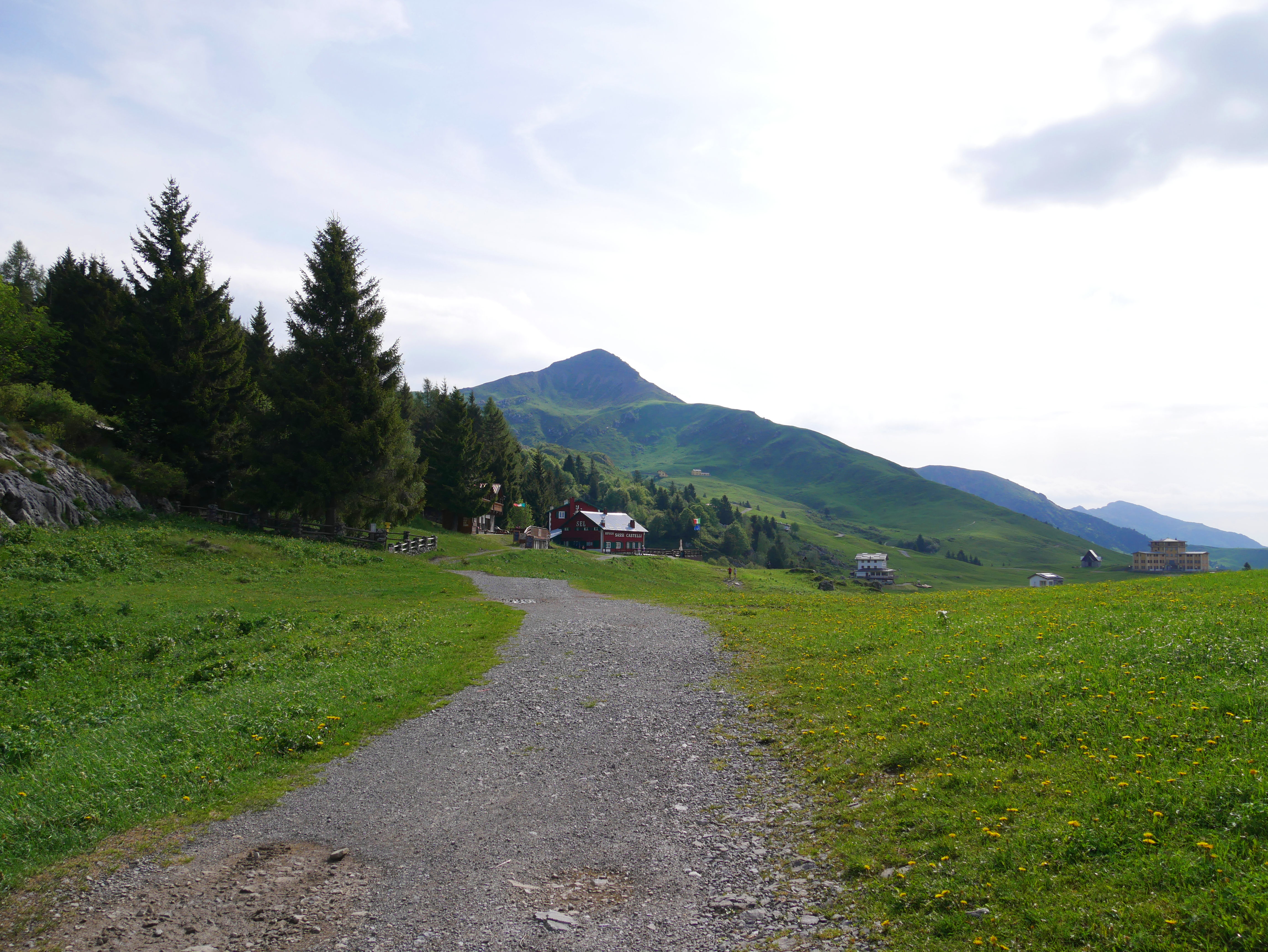
Moggio: Piani di Artavaggio, with Mount Sodadura in background

== Twin towns ==
Moggio is twinned with:

- Moggio Udinese, Italy
