= Rennet =

Enzymes from the stomachs of ruminants, used in cheese production

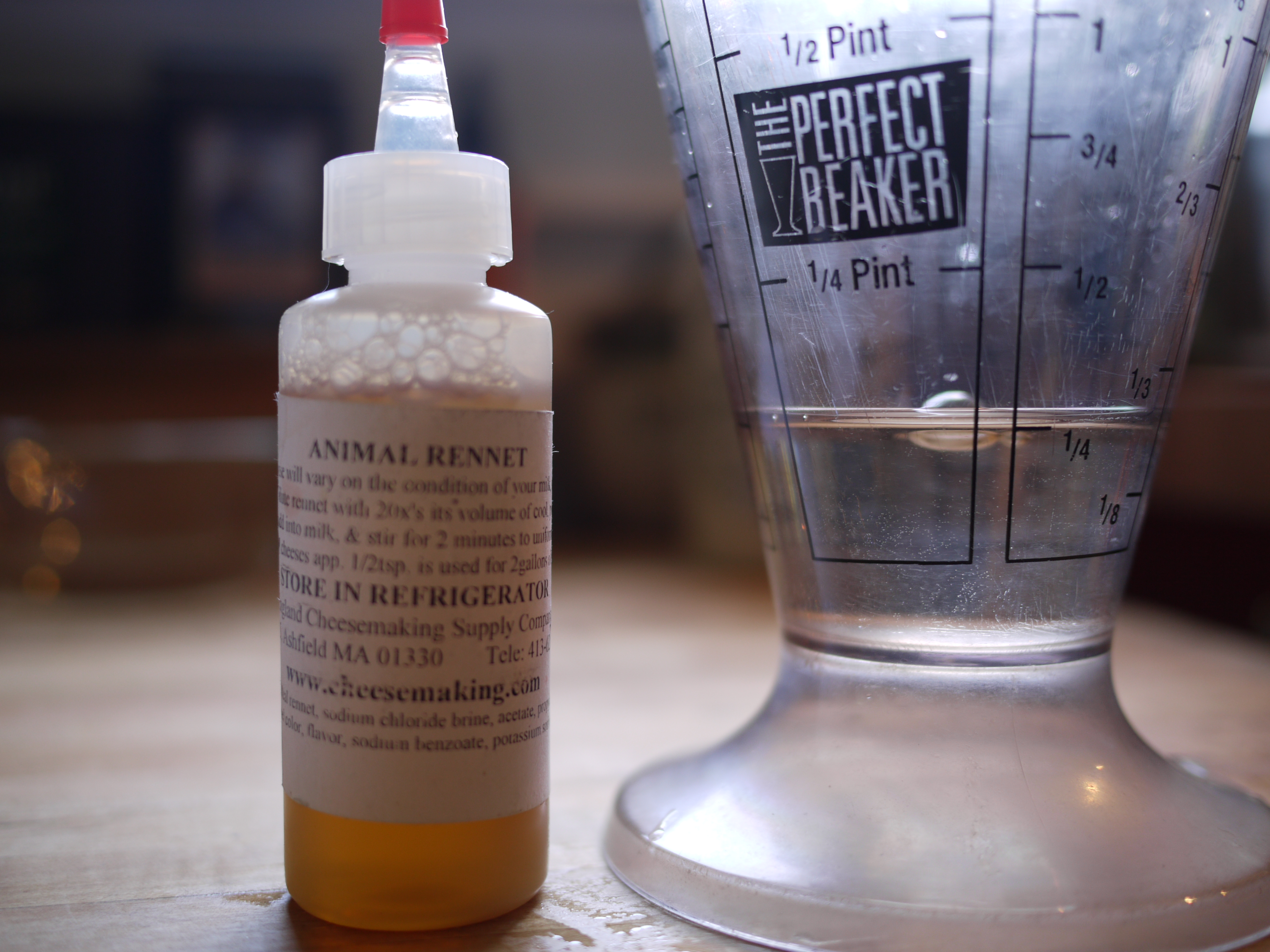
Animal rennet to be used in the manufacture of cheddar cheese

Rennet (/ˈrɛnɪt/) is a complex set of enzymes produced in the stomachs of ruminant mammals. Its key component is chymosin, a protease enzyme that curdles the casein proteins in milk. Rennet also contains other enzymes such as pepsin and a lipase.

Rennet has traditionally been used to separate milk into solid curds and liquid whey, used in the production of cheeses. Rennet from calves has become less common for this use, to the point that less than 5% of cheese in the United States is made using animal rennet today. Most cheese is now made using chymosin derived from bacterial sources.

== Molecular action of rennet enzymes ==
One of the main actions of rennet is its protease chymosin cleaving the kappa casein chain. Casein is the main protein of milk. Cleavage removes the slightly negatively charged glycomacropeptide (GMP) from the surface of the casein micelle. Because negative charges repel other negative charges, the GMP prevents casein micelles from adhering to each other. With the GMP removed, the casein micelles can begin to cluster and lose their polar charge, causing them to rise out of the polar water molecules and join non-polar milk fat as a portion of the cheese curd. This action is enhanced in the presence of strong ions like those formed from calcium and phosphate. As such, those chemicals are occasionally added to supplement pre-existing quantities in the cheese making process, especially in calcium phosphate-poor goat milk. The solid truncated casein protein network traps other components of milk, such as fats and minerals, to create cheese.

== Extraction of calf rennet ==
Calf rennet is extracted from the inner mucosa of the fourth stomach chamber (the abomasum) of young, nursing calves as part of livestock butchering. These stomachs are a byproduct of veal production. Rennet extracted from older calves (grass-fed or grain-fed) contains less or no chymosin, but a high level of pepsin and can only be used for special types of milk and cheeses. As each ruminant produces a special kind of rennet to digest the milk of its own species, milk-specific rennets are available, such as kid goat rennet for goat's milk and lamb rennet for sheep's milk.

=== Traditional method ===
Dried and cleaned stomachs of young calves are sliced into small pieces and then put into salt water or whey, together with some vinegar or wine to lower the pH of the solution. After some time (overnight or several days), the solution is filtered. The crude rennet that remains in the filtered solution can then be used to coagulate milk. About 1 gram of this solution can normally coagulate 2 to 4 litres of milk.

=== Modern method ===
Deep-frozen stomachs are milled and put into an enzyme-extracting solution. The crude rennet extract is then activated by adding acid; the enzymes in the stomach are produced in an inactive form and are activated by the stomach acid. The acid is then neutralized and the rennet extract is filtered in several stages and concentrated until reaching a typical potency of about 1:15,000; meaning 1 g of extract can coagulate 15 kg of milk.

One kilogram of rennet extract has about 0.7 g of active enzymes – the rest is water and salt and sometimes sodium benzoate (E211), 0.5%–1.0% for preservation. Typically, 1 kg of cheese contains about 0.3 mg of rennet enzymes.

== Alternative sources ==
Because of the limited availability of mammalian stomachs for rennet production, cheese makers have sought other ways to coagulate milk since at least Roman times. The many sources of enzymes that can be a substitute for animal rennet range from plants and fungi to microbial sources. Cheeses produced from any of these varieties of rennet are suitable for lactovegetarians, as well as those keeping Kosher. Fermentation-produced chymosin is used more often in industrial cheesemaking in North America and Europe today because it is less expensive than animal rennet.

=== Vegetable ===
Many plants have coagulating properties. Homer suggests in the Iliad that the Greeks used an extract of fig juice to coagulate milk. Other examples include several species of Galium, dried caper leaves, nettles, thistles, mallow, Withania coagulans (also known as Paneer Booti, Ashwagandh and the Indian Cheesemaker), and ground ivy. Some traditional cheese production in the Mediterranean uses enzymes from thistle or Cynara (artichokes and cardoons). Phytic acid, derived from unfermented soybeans, or fermentation-produced chymosin (FPC) may also be used.

Vegetable rennet might be used in the production of kosher and halal cheeses, but nearly all kosher cheeses are produced with either microbial rennet or FPC. Commercial so-called vegetable rennets usually contain an extract from the mold Rhizomucor miehei described below.

=== Microbial ===
Some molds such as Rhizomucor miehei are able to produce proteolytic enzymes. These molds are produced in a fermenter and then specially concentrated and purified to avoid contamination with unpleasant byproducts of the mold growth.

The traditional view is that these coagulants result in bitterness and low yield in cheese, especially when aged for a long time. In modern times, microbial coagulants have improved greatly, largely due to the characterization and purification of secondary enzymes responsible for bitter peptide formation/non-specific proteolytic breakdown in cheese aged for long periods. Consequently, it has become possible to produce several high-quality cheeses with microbial rennet.

It is also suitable for the elaboration of vegetarian cheese, provided no animal-based ingredients are used in its production.

=== Fermentation-produced chymosin ===
Because of the above imperfections of microbial and animal rennets, many producers sought other replacements of rennet. With genetic engineering it became possible to isolate rennet genes from animals and introduce them into certain bacteria, fungi, or yeasts to make them produce recombinant chymosin during fermentation. The genetically modified microorganism is killed after fermentation and chymosin isolated from the fermentation broth, so that the fermentation-produced chymosin (FPC) used by cheese producers does not contain a GMO or any GMO DNA. FPC is identical to chymosin made by an animal, but is produced in a more efficient way. FPC products have been on the market since 1990 and, because the quantity needed per unit of milk can be standardized, are commercially viable alternatives to crude animal or plant rennets, as well as generally preferred to them in industrial production.

Originally created by biotechnology company Pfizer, FPC was the first artificially-produced enzyme to be registered and allowed by the US Food and Drug Administration in 1990. By 1999, about 60% of US hard cheeses were made with FPC, and by 2006 FPC made up to 80% of the global market share for rennet. By 2017, FPC had 90% of the global market share for rennet. By 2021, animal rennet still found use in some traditional or designated European cheeses but FPC covered 80-90% of the market in the US and UK.

The most widely used FPC is produced either by E. coli K-12 and commercialized under the trademark CHY-MAX by the Danish company Chr. Hansen, or produced by Kluyveromyces lactis and commercialized under the trademark Maxiren by the Dutch company DSM.

FPC is chymosin B, so it is purer than animal rennet, which contains a multitude of proteins. FPC provides several benefits to the cheese producer compared with animal or microbial rennet: higher production yield, better curd texture, and reduced bitterness.

Cheeses produced with FPC can be certified kosher and halal.

== Nonrennet coagulation ==
Many soft cheeses are produced without use of rennet, by coagulating milk with acid, such as citric acid or vinegar, or the lactic acid produced by soured milk. Cream cheese, paneer, rubing, and other acid-set cheeses are traditionally made this way. The acidification can also come from bacterial fermentation such as in cultured milk.

Vegan alternatives to cheese are manufactured without using animal milk but instead use soy, wheat, rice or cashew. These can be coagulated with acid using sources such as vinegar or lemon juice.

== In mythology ==
In Yazidism, the Earth is believed to have coagulated and formed when rennet flowed from the White Spring of the celestial Lalish in heaven into the Primeval Ocean.

== See also ==
- Cheese
- Junket (dessert)
- Milk
