= Taleggio, Lombardy =

Taleggio
- Comune
- Comune di Taleggio
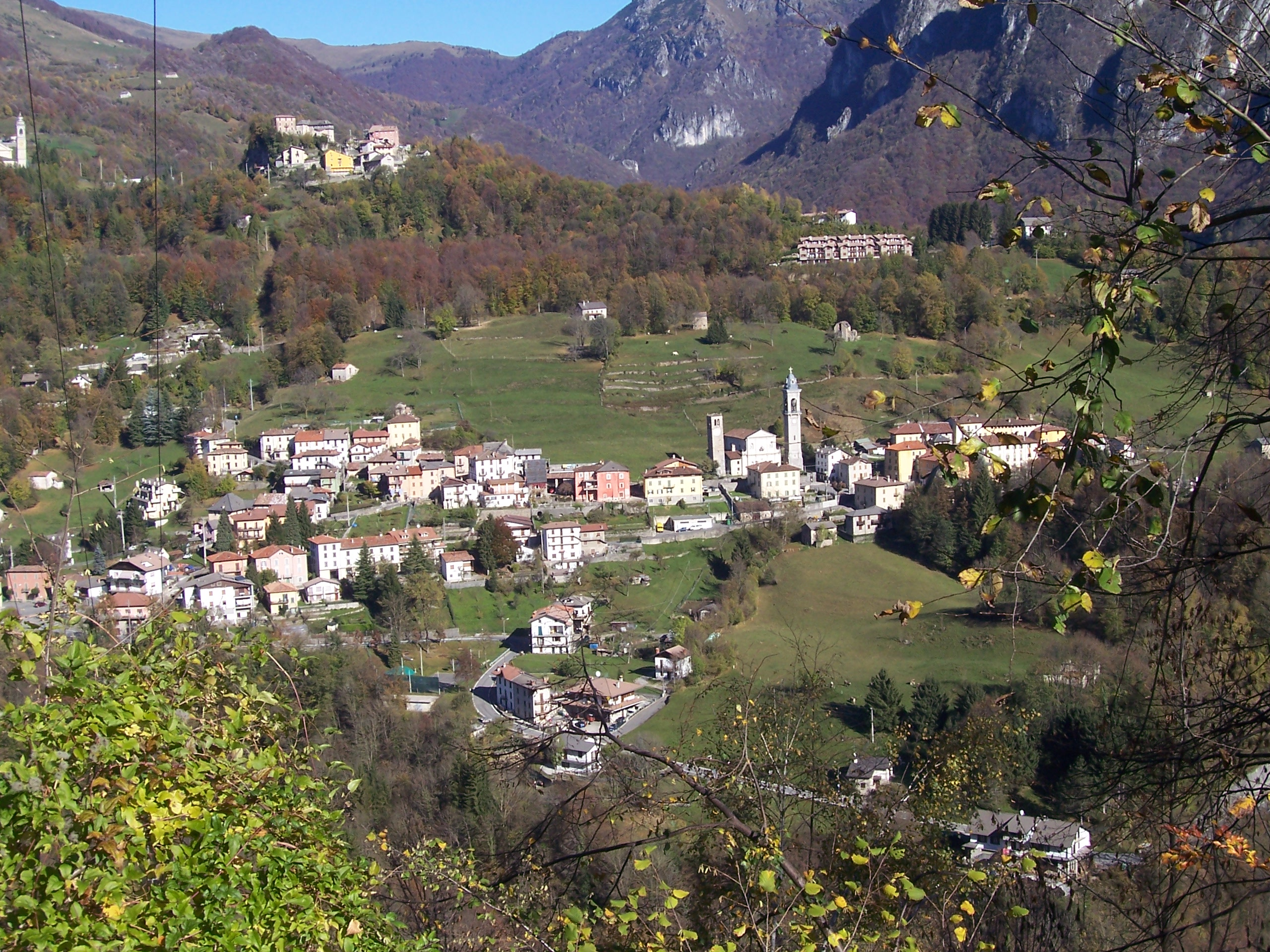
- Taleggio

- Coat of arms

- Location within Italy Location within Lombardy
- Coordinates: 45°54′N 9°34′E
- Country: Italy
- Region: Lombardy
- Province: Province of Bergamo (BG)
- Frazioni: Olda, Peghera, Sottochiesa, Pizzino

Area
  - Total: 46.6 km^{2} (18.0 sq mi)
- Elevation: 758 m (2,487 ft)

Population (Dec. 2004)
  - Total: 583
  - Density: 12.5/km^{2} (32.4/sq mi)
- Demonym: Taleggini
- Time zone: UTC+1 (CET)
  - Summer (DST): UTC+2 (CEST)
- Postal code: 24010
- Dialing code: 0345

Taleggio (Bergamasque: Taècc) is a comune (municipality) in the Province of Bergamo in the Italian region of Lombardy, located about 60 kilometres (37 mi) northeast of Milan and about 25 kilometres (16 mi) northwest of Bergamo. As of 31 December 2004, it had a population of 583 and an area of 46.6 square kilometres (18.0 mi^{2}).

The municipality of Taleggio contains the frazioni (subdivisions, mainly villages and hamlets) Olda, Peghera, Sottochiesa and Pizzino.

Taleggio borders the following municipalities: Camerata Cornello, Cassiglio, Fuipiano Valle Imagna, Gerosa, Moggio, San Giovanni Bianco, Vedeseta.

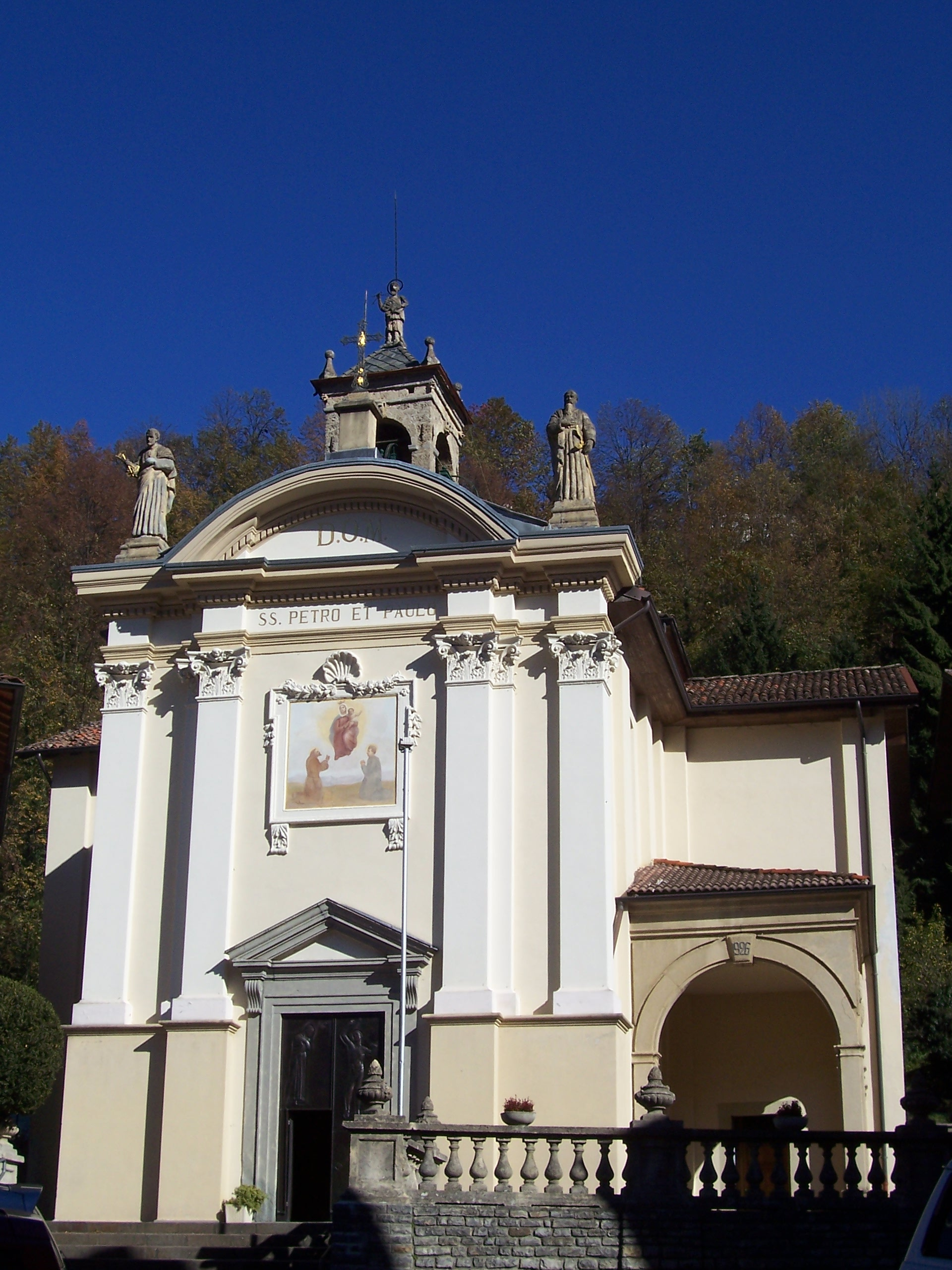
San Pietro church

== Demographic evolution ==
Historical population

Year	Pop.	±%
1861	1,803	—
1871	1,294	−28.2%
1881	1,387	+7.2%
1901	1,470	+6.0%
1911	2,146	+46.0%

Year	Pop.	±%
1921	2,327	+8.4%
1931	1,971	−15.3%
1936	1,539	−21.9%
1951	1,411	−8.3%
1961	1,267	−10.2%

Year	Pop.	±%
1971	968	−23.6%
1981	753	−22.2%
1991	684	−9.2%
2001	582	−14.9%

Source: Data from ISTAT
