= San Giovanni Bianco =

- Comune
- Comune di San Giovanni Bianco
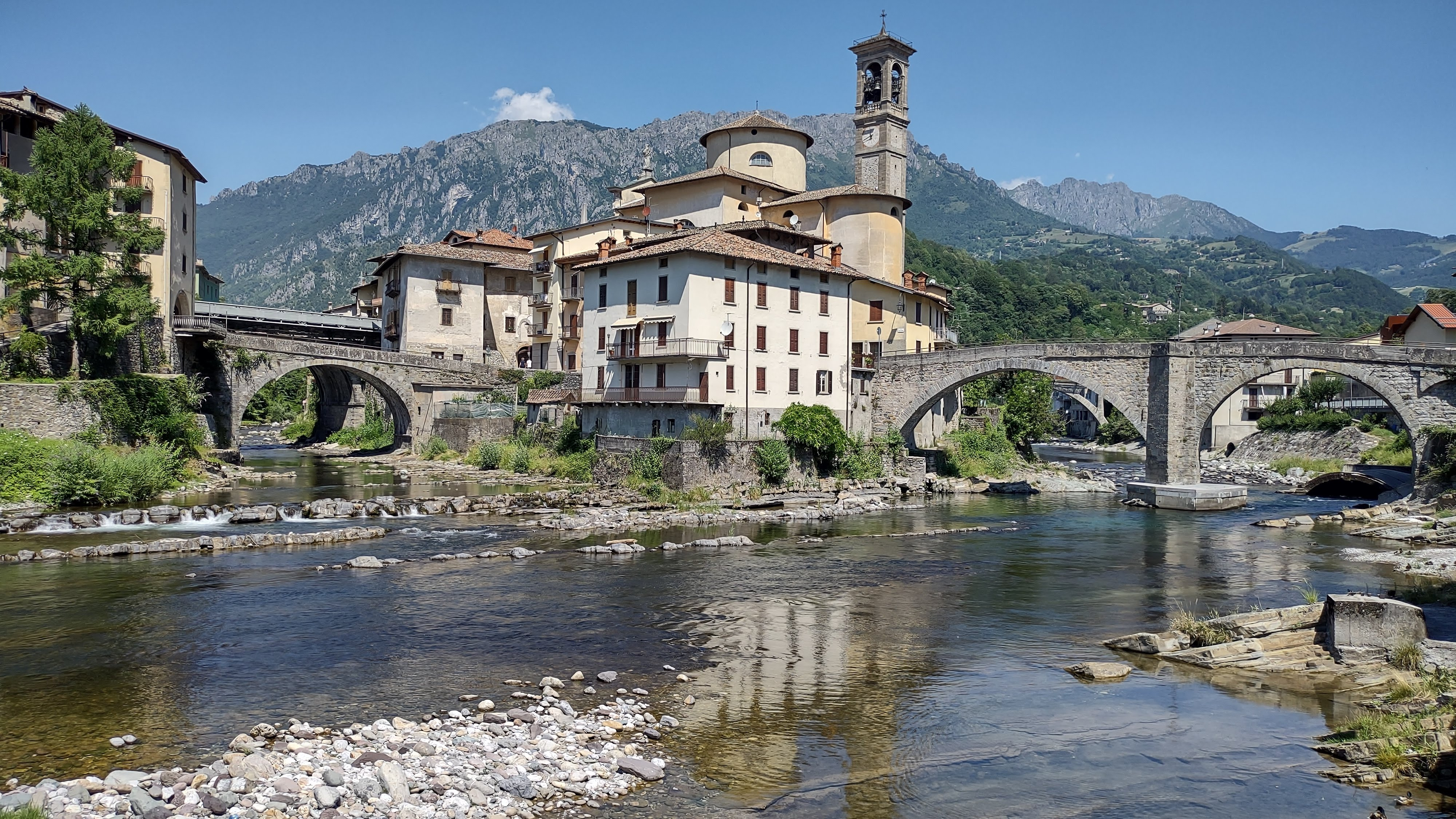
- The river Brembo at San Giovanni Bianco

- Coat of arms

- Location within Italy Location within Lombardy
- Coordinates: 45°52′N 9°39′E
- Country: Italy
- Region: Lombardy
- Province: Bergamo (BG)
- Frazioni: Cornalita, Costa San Gallo, Fuipiano al Brembo, La Portiera, Oneta, Pianca, Roncaglia, San Gallo, San Pietro d'Orzio

Government
  - Mayor: Enrica Bonzi

Area
  - Total: 31.4 km^{2} (12.1 sq mi)
- Elevation: 448 m (1,470 ft)

Population (31 May 2021)
  - Total: 4,653
  - Density: 148/km^{2} (384/sq mi)
- Demonym: Sangiovannesi
- Time zone: UTC+1 (CET)
  - Summer (DST): UTC+2 (CEST)
- Postal code: 24015
- Dialing code: 0345
- Website: Official website

San Giovanni Bianco (Bergamasque: San Gioàn Biànch) is a comune (municipality) in the Province of Bergamo in the Italian region Lombardy, located about 60 kilometres (37 mi) northeast of Milan and about 20 kilometres (12 mi) north of Bergamo, located in the Val Brembana.

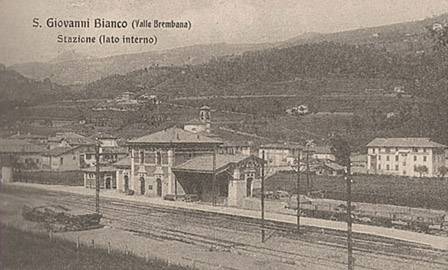
San Giovanni Bianco railway station
