= Artificial silk =

Synthetic fiber resembling silk

Artificial silk or art silk is any synthetic fiber which resembles silk, but typically costs less to produce. Frequently, the term artificial silk is just a synonym for rayon.

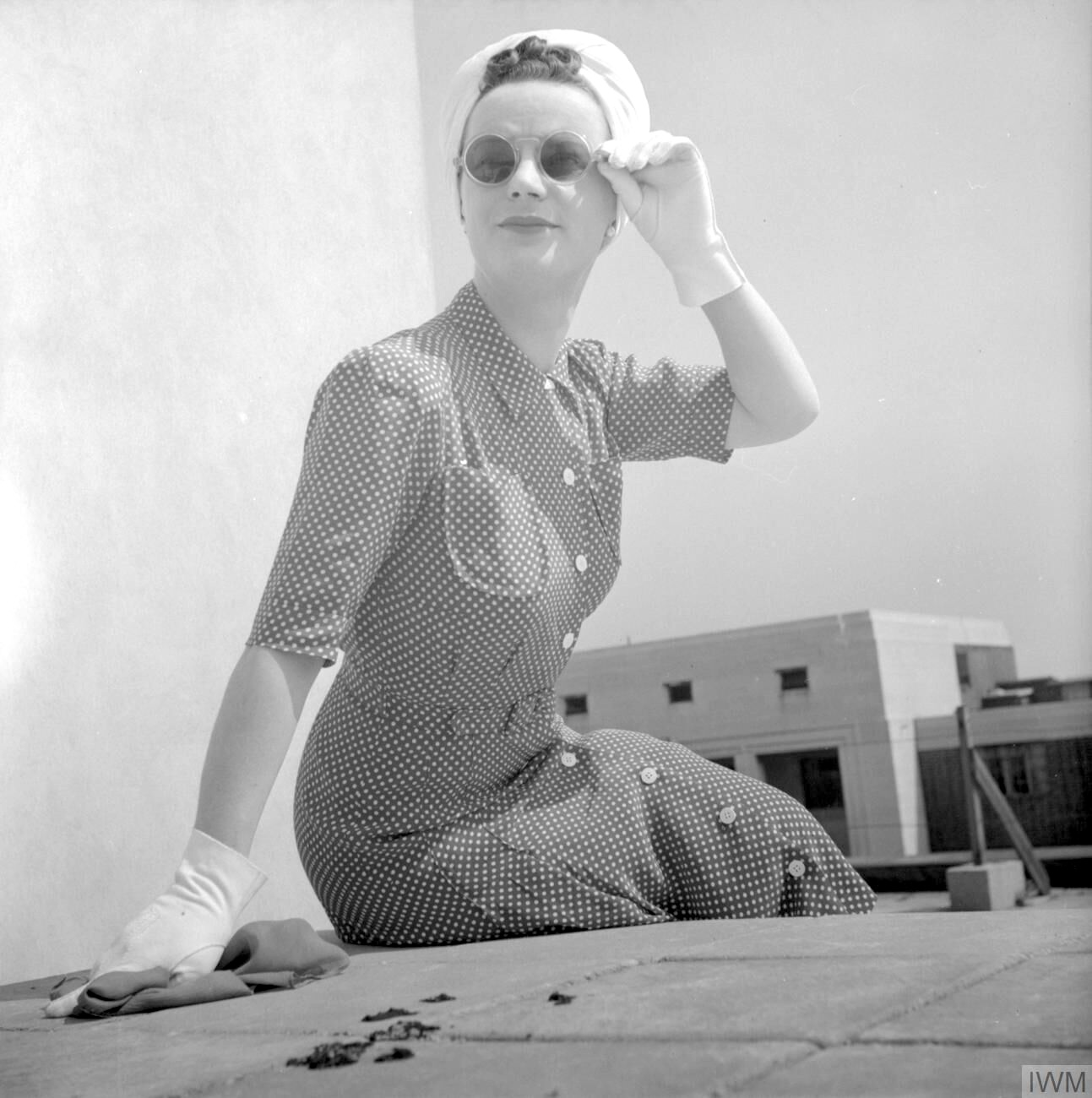
A woman wearing a Utility rayon shirt dress with front-buttoning, 1943

The first successful artificial silks were developed in the 1890s of cellulose fiber and marketed as art silk or viscose, a trade name for a specific manufacturer.

In the 1910s and 1920s, several manufacturers of viscose competed in Europe and the United States to produce what was frequently called artificial silk. In 1924, the name of the fiber was officially changed in the U.S. to Rayon, although the term viscose continued to be used in Europe. The material is commonly referred to in the industry as viscose rayon.

In 1931, Henry Ford hired chemists Robert Boyer and Frank Calvert to produce artificial silk made with soybean fibers. They succeeded in making a textile fiber of spun soy protein fibers, hardened or tanned in a formaldehyde bath, which was given the name Azlon. It was usable for making suits, felt hats, and overcoats. Though pilot production of Azlon reached 5,000 pounds (2,300 kg) per day in 1940, it never reached the commercial market; DuPont's nylon became the most important artificial silk.

Although not sold under the name art silk initially, nylon, the first synthetic fiber, was developed in the United States in the late 1930s and was used as a replacement for Japanese silk during World War II. Its properties are far superior to rayon and silk when wet, and so it was used for many military applications, such as parachutes. Although nylon is not a good substitute for silk fabric in appearance, it is a successful functional alternative. DuPont's original plans for nylon to become a cheaper and superior replacement for silk stockings were soon realized, then redirected for military use just two years later during World War II. Nylon became a prominent industrial fiber in a short time frame, permanently replacing silk in many applications.

In the present day, imitation silk may be made with rayon, mercerized cotton, polyester, a blend of these materials, or a blend of rayon and silk.

Despite a generally similar appearance, genuine silk has unique features that are distinguishable from artificial silk. However, in some cases artificial silk can be passed off as real silk to unwary buyers. A number of tests are available to determine a fabric's basic fiber makeup, some of which can be performed prior to purchasing a fabric whose composition is questionable. Tests include rubbing the pile in the hand, burning a small piece of the fringe to smell the ash and smell smoke, and dissolving the pile by performing a chemical test.
