= Westland Milk Products =

New Zealand dairy processor

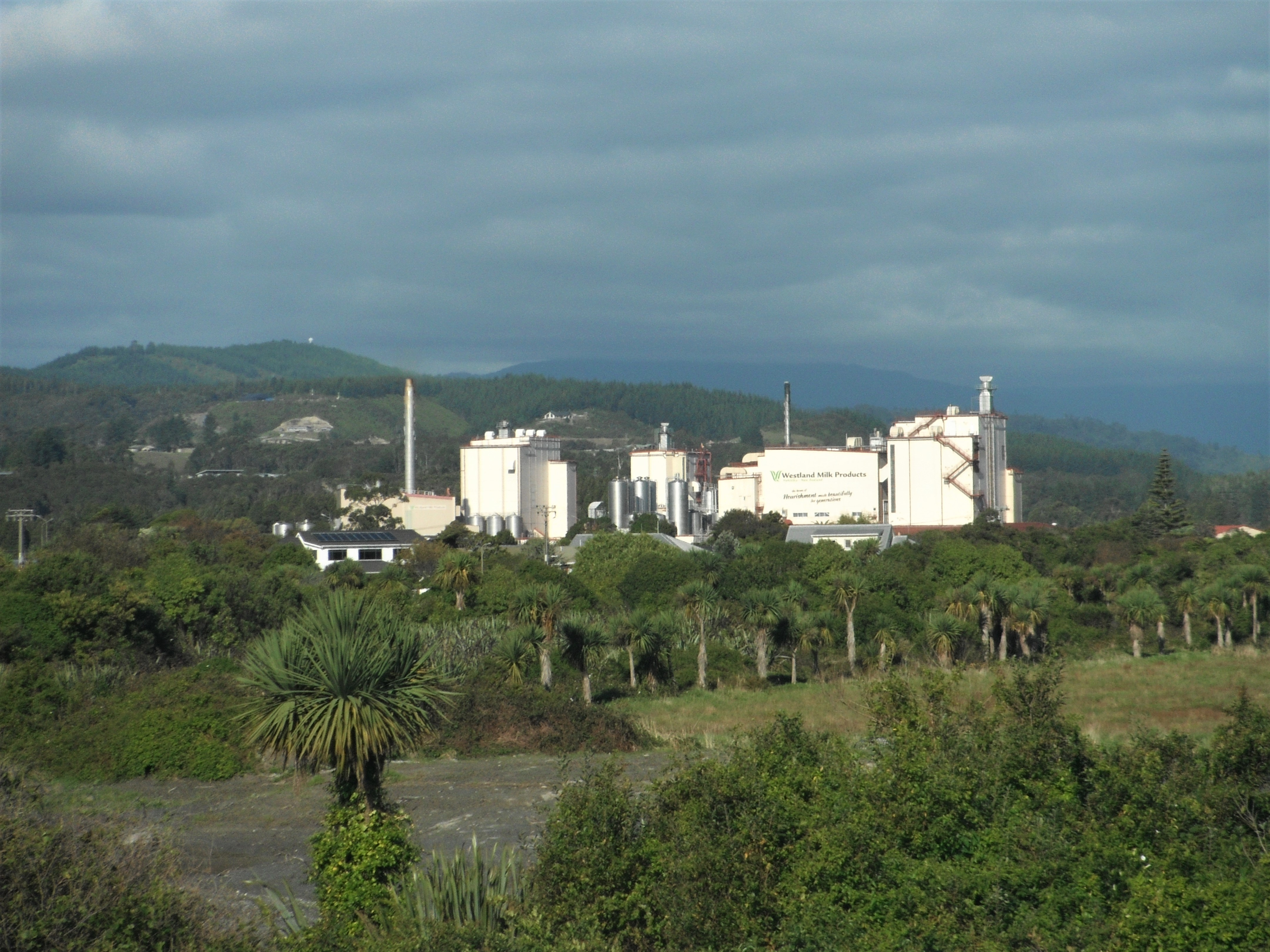
- Westland Milk Products' main processing plant in Hokitika.
- Type: Subsidiary
- Industry: Dairy
- Founded: 1937
- Headquarters: Hokitika, New Zealand
- Key people: Zhiqiang Li, (CEO)
- Revenue: NZD $588 million (2016 Annual Report)
- Members: 429
- Number of employees: ~500
- Parent: Yili Group
- Website: westland.co.nz

Westland Milk Products is a dairy company based in Hokitika, New Zealand. It has been owned by Chinese dairy company Yili Group since 2019. It is the third largest dairy processor in New Zealand (behind Fonterra and Open Country Dairy, and tied with Synlait) with a 3.4% market share.

Milk is sourced from farms across the West Coast, as far north as Karamea and as far south as Haast, and from farms throughout Canterbury. Westland's major processing factory is located in Hokitika, with its main warehouse and milk concentration plant near Rolleston in Canterbury.

== History ==
The Westland Co-operative Dairy Company Limited was formed in 1937 following the amalgamation of a number of small co-operatives within the Westland region including Kokatahi, Waitaha and part of the Arahura Dairy Companies.

Prior to the restructuring of the dairy industry in 2001, dairy products manufactured in New Zealand were marketed and exported by the New Zealand Dairy Board, which was jointly owned by all dairy companies. In 2001, the industry was deregulated and the New Zealand Dairy Group, Kiwi Co-operative Dairies and the New Zealand Dairy Board amalgamated to form Fonterra. Westland Milk Products shareholders elected not to participate in the amalgamation and so became a fully independent dairy company responsible for the sales and marketing of its products.

In 2004, Westland launched its consumer butter brand Westgold.

In 2009, the Rolleston storage and sales and marketing office was established, and the site now also houses a Reverse Osmosis Plant and staff from business areas including customer service, IT, finance, supply chain, human resources and milk collection.

In 2010, Westland acquired full ownership of EasiYo, a make-at-home yoghurt company based in Auckland. In 2011, milk collection from Canterbury shareholders began.

In 2012, Westland began manufacture of infant nutritional products and launched its Westpro Nutrition range. In 2013 this was followed by the construction of Dryer 7, a dedicated infant and toddler nutritionals (ITN) plant.

In 2014, Westland opened its first offshore office in Shanghai, China

On 18 March 2019, China's Yili Group signed an agreement to acquire 100% equity of Westland Milk Products, subject to shareholder approval, which was given on 4 July.

== Products ==
Westland manufactures a variety of products derived from milk, ranging from commercial milk powders to infant nutrition products. The full range of products is listed below.

=== Ingredients ===
- Skim milk powder
- Whole milk powder
- Buttermilk powder
- Milk protein concentrate
- Whey protein concentrate
- Casein and caseinates
- Butter
- Anhydrous milk fat (AMF)

=== Bio-active ===
- Lactoferrin
- Colostrum

=== Infant and toddler nutritionals ===
- Stage 1 Infant Formula base
- Stage 2 Infant Formula base
- Stage 3 Infant Formula base

== Organisational memberships ==
- New Zealand Co-operatives Association (Inc)
- Dairy Companies Association of New Zealand (DCANZ)
- Infant Nutrition Council

== Sites ==
Westland Milk Products has three sites worldwide.

- Headquarters in Hokitika, New Zealand, on the corner of Livingstone and Stafford Streets
- In the industrial zone in Rolleston, 23 kilometres (14 miles) south of Christchurch, on Westland Place
- China office in the municipality of Changning in Shanghai, China.

== Quality management system ==
Westland Milk Products uses a quality management system known as Food Safety System Certification (FSSC) 22000 to monitor all aspects of its operations including milk collection, administration, stores and maintenance. An independent organisation audits this system to an international standard.

== Awards ==
Westland Milk Products has won a number of business and innovation awards.

In 2012, Westland Milk Products won the Ministry of Science and Innovation's Best Use of Research and Development category at the New Zealand International Business Awards. In the same year, Westland Milk Products was also named the Supreme Winner of the 2012 West Coast Lending Light Business Excellence Awards.

Westland Milk Products was a finalist in the 2016 New Zealand International Business Awards for the Excellence in Design category. In March 2016, Westgold Unsalted Butter, a trademarked product of Westland Milk Products, won the Food for Chefs Champion Butter Award.

== Community involvement ==
In 2016, Westland Milk Products partnered with the Westland District Council to fund the Blue Spur Water Treatment Plant Expansion Project. This project received an award in the Chorus Excellence Award for Best Practice in Infrastructure Management.

Westland Milk Products sponsors Ronald McDonald House, Federated Farmers, the Canterbury West Coast Air Rescue Trust, as well as numerous hockey, netball, rugby union, basketball and rugby league junior sports clubs in the Buller, Grey and Westland Districts of the West Coast. Additionally, Westland Milk Products has formerly been a sponsor of the West Coast Penguin Trust.
