= Robert Boyer =

Robert Boyer may refer to:

- Robert S. Boyer, professor of computer science, mathematics, and philosophy
- See List of Charles Whitman's victims for Robert Hamilton Boyer, professor killed at The University of Texas in 1966
- Robert Boyer (artist) (1948–2004), Canadian artist of aboriginal heritage
- Robert Boyer (chemist) (1909–1989), chemist employed by Henry Ford
- Robert James Boyer (1913–2005), former politician in Ontario, Canada
- Bob Boyer (wrestler) (1932–2026), retired Canadian professional wrestler

== See also ==
- Robert Boyers (disambiguation)
- Robert Bowyer (1758–1834), British painter and publisher
