= Arafune-Azumaya Cold Storage Facilities =

Building in Gunma Prefecture, Japan

UNESCO World Heritage Site
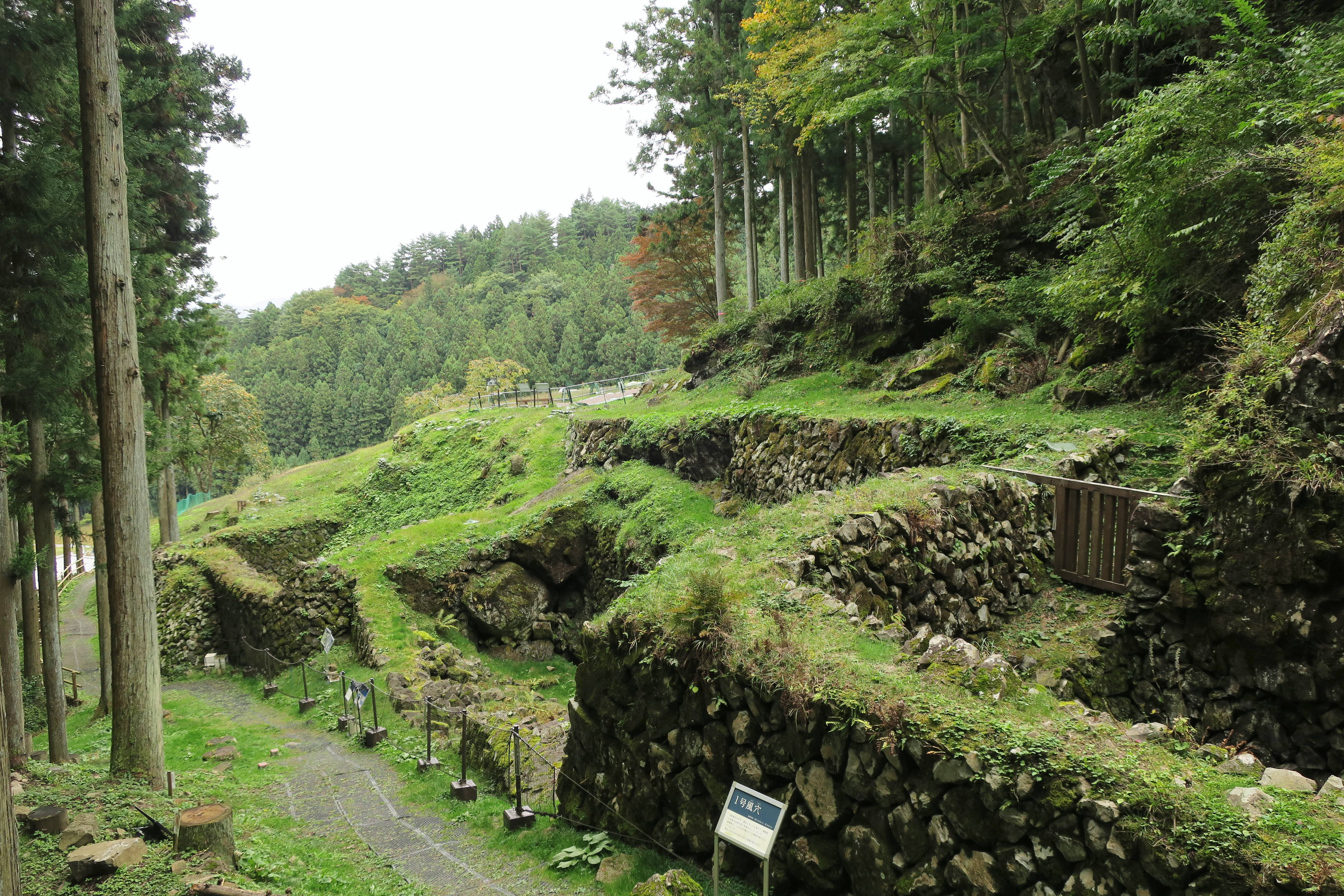
- Arafune Cold Storage

- Location within Gunma Prefecture Location within Japan
- Location: Gunma Prefecture, Japan
- Part of: Tomioka Silk Mill and Related Sites
- Criteria: Cultural: (ii), (iv)
- Reference: 1449
- Inscription: 2014 (38th Session)
- Coordinates: 36°38′02″N 138°52′39″E
- National Historic Site of Japan

Arafune-Azumaya Cold Storage Facilities (荒船・東谷風穴蚕種貯蔵所跡, Arafune-Azumaya fūketsu sanshu chozō sho ato) are natural refrigerators used in silkworm production in association with the Tomioka Silk Mill in the towns of Shimonita and Nakanojō, Gunma Prefecture Japan. They are jointly designated as a National Historic Site and, together with the Tomioka Silk Mill, inscribed on the UNESCO World Heritage List as part of the serial nomination Tomioka Silk Mill and Related Sites

== Overview ==
Following the Meiji restoration, the new Meiji government needed export products to raise the monies necessary for the industrialization and westernization of Japan. Goods which were already produced in Japan and which could be exported for good profit included tea, silk thread and silkworm cocoons. Especially with the spread of the silkworm disease called pébrine in France and Italy, and the turmoil in China caused by the Taiping Rebellion, Japanese silk was in high demand. In 1862, shortly before the Meiji restoration, raw silk and silkworm cocoons accounted for 86% for Japan's exports. However, soon after the Meiji restoration, overproduction, and the recovery of silk producing areas in Europe and China led to a drastic fall in raw silk prices. The Meiji government countered by changing its focus to silk products, such as silk thread and cloth, to increase the value of its silk exports. The opening of the Tomioka Silk Mill in 1872 saw a boom in sericulture in Gunma Prefecture and surrounding areas, and the raising of silkworms became the primary activity for many farmers.

In order to adjust the hatching time of silkworms, a number of wind caves were modified for use as natural refrigerators for cold storage of silkworm eggs. Cool air is produced by wind passing through rock crevices filled with snow accumulated over winter. Even in the summer when the outside temperature is over 20 degrees Celsius, the temperature in the cave remains a constant couple degrees above freezing. This enabled the number of silkworm "crops" to be produced each year to be increased from one to two or even three, thus greatly contributing to the increase in the production of raw silk cocoons to meet the ever increasing demand. When government control over the silkworm industry was abolished in 1917, 239 such facilities were confirmed nationwide. These facilities remained in use into the middle of the twentieth century, until rendered obsolete with the spread of mechanical refrigeration technology, and most have now disappeared or their exact location is unknown.

The Arafune Cold Storage facility in Shimonita is located on a slope along a stream at an elevation of about 840 meters near the border of Nagano Prefecture, about 16 kilometers west of central Shimonita Town. The three large-scale facilities built from 1905 to 1912, and have the largest storage capacity in Japan, capable of storing 1.1 million silkworm eggs. The No. 1 wind cave had a frontage of 7 meters and a depth of 3.5 meters, the No. 2 wind cave had a frontage of 11.5 meters and a depth of 3.5 meters, and the No. 3 wind cave had a frontage of 8 meters and a depth of 3.5 meters. The storehouses built on top of these wind caves were all three-story structures with clay-covered walls. There are no buildings left at present, but the masonry remains intact, and cold air continues to blow out from the walls at a temperature of around 2 deg C year round. It is located about 25 minutes by car from Shimonita Station on the Joshin Dentetsu.

The Azumaya Cold Storage facility in Nakanojō is located at an elevation of 680 meters at the northern foot of Mount Higashitani, 6 kilometers northeast of the town. It was built in 1906 was capable of storing over 100,000 trays of silk worm eggs, making it one of the largest regional wind caves in Japan. Ice and snow were also used to cool the silkworm eggs, and according to the photographs and field surveys at that time, there was a management building and two large and small storages, and the large No. 1 wind cave was on the second basement floor surrounded by masonry around the cold air outlet. The building consisting of one floor above ground, and two basement floors which was used for ice storage. The building no longer exists, but the masonry of the wind cave and the cornerstone of the office remain.

== See also ==
- List of World Heritage Sites in Japan
- List of Historic Sites of Japan (Gunma)
