= Milk fiber =

Type of Azlon, a regenerated protein fiber based on the casein protein found in milk

Milk fiber or milk wool is a type of Azlon, a regenerated protein fiber based on the casein protein found in milk. There are several trade names for milk-casein-based fibers, including Lanital, Fibrolane and Aralac.

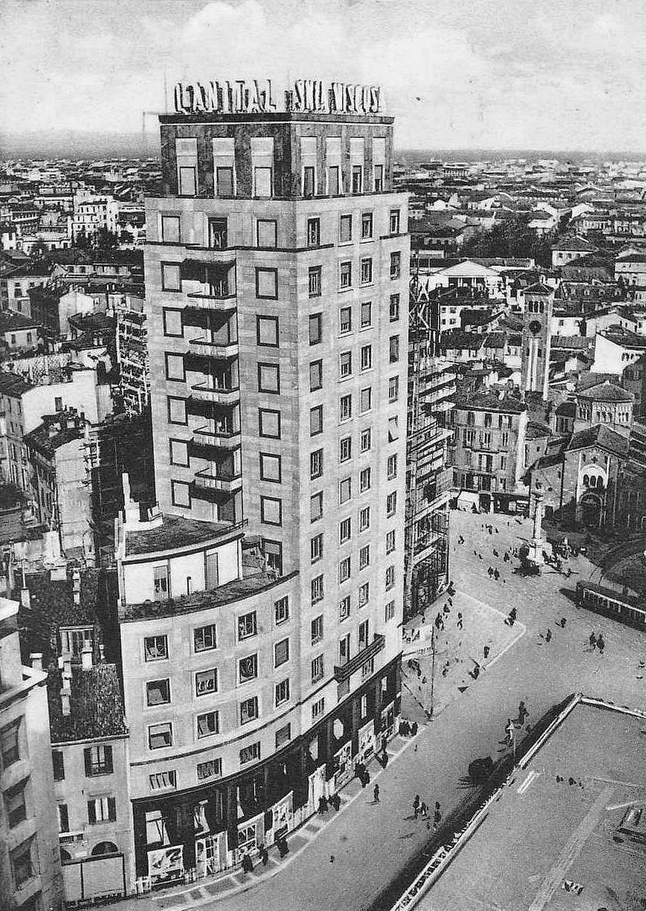
SNIA Viscosa was the first producer of milk fiber.

== Invention and history ==
First produced and patented in Italy in 1935 by Antonio Ferretti and sold under the name Lanital, milk fiber was created under an Italian national self-sufficiency drive and was intended to capitalize on previous successes with rayon. Milk fibers enjoyed a brief period of success in the 1930s and 1940s. The popularity of milk fibers declined rapidly once full-synthetic fibers were developed. Fully synthetic fibers, such as acrylic, were able to significantly undercut milk fiber on price while being more durable. During the 2000s, several producers worked to reintroduce milk fibers to commercial production.

== Production process ==
The production process of milk fiber was of some public interest and was documented on film by several contemporary sources. A simplified overview of the process is as follows:

1. Acid is mixed with milk to extract the casein.
2. Water is evaporated to form casein crystals.
3. The casein is hydrated to a thick syrup and extruded through spinnerets.
4. The resulting fiber is passed through a hardening bath.
5. The continuous fiber is then cut to the desired length.
