= Takayama-sha =

UNESCO World Heritage Site
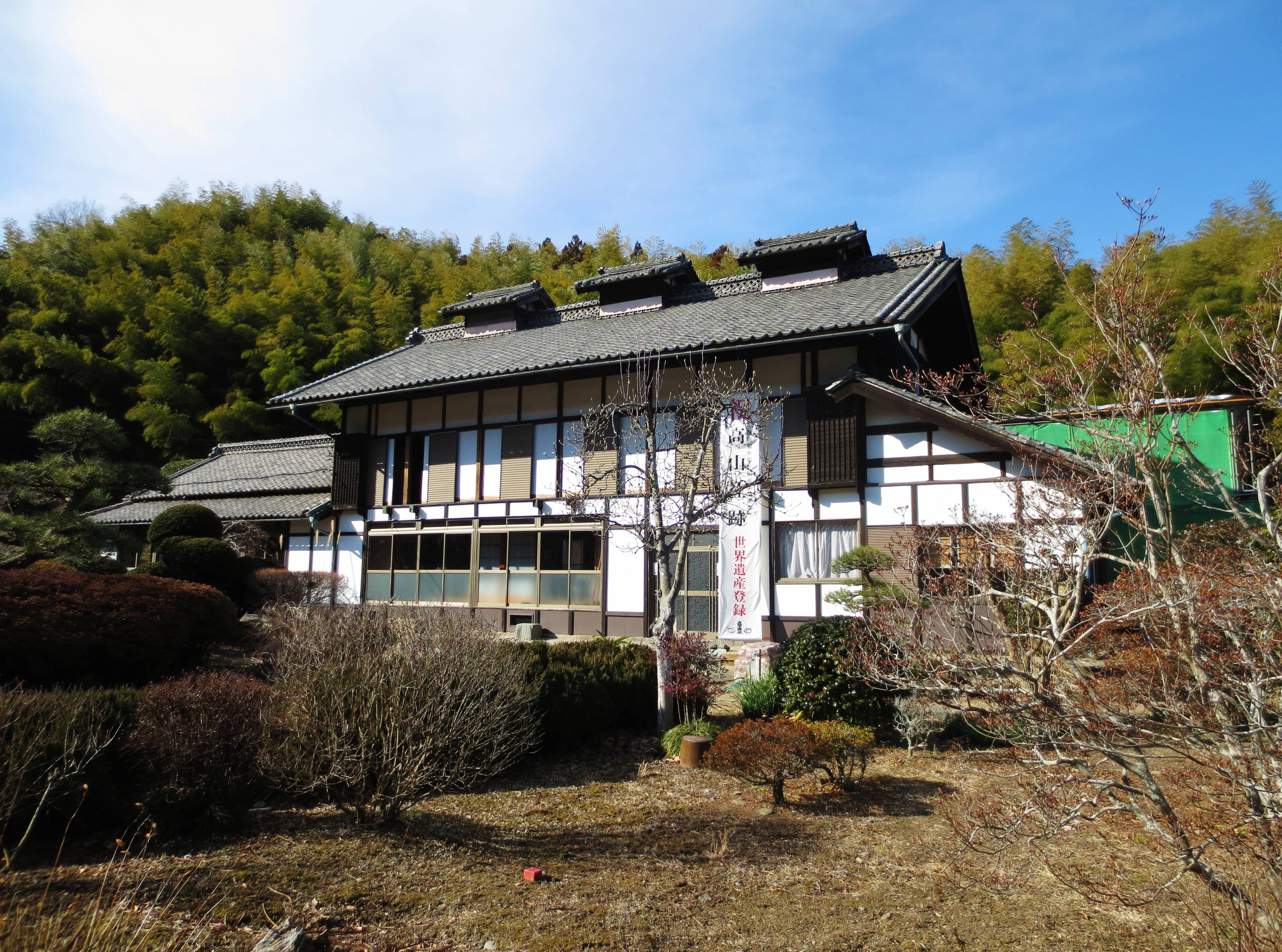
- Takayama-sha

- Location within Gunma Prefecture Location within Japan
- Location: Fujioka, Gunma, Japan
- Part of: Tomioka Silk Mill and Related Sites
- Criteria: Cultural: (ii), (iv)
- Reference: 1449
- Inscription: 2014 (38th Session)
- Area: 8.0 ha (20 acres)
- Buffer zone: 151.1 ha (373 acres)
- Website: www.tomioka-silk.jp/tomioka-silk-mill
- Coordinates: 36°12′12″N 139°01′54″E
- UNESCO World Heritage Site National Historic Site of Japan

The Takayama Sericulture School (高山社, Takayama-sha), also known as the "Takayama-sha Sericulture School" or the "Takayama-sha Sericulture Improvement Society", was a school and research institute located in the city of Fujioka, Gunma. It was founded in 1884 by sericulturist Takayama Chōgorō to teach sericulture and conduct research on improvements to Japan's fledgling silk industry. The school building from 1887 was made a National Historic Site of Japan in 2009. It has been listed as a UNESCO World Heritage Site since 2014 under the overall designation of "Tomioka Silk Mill and associated sites" .

== Overview ==
Takayama Chōgorō (1830-1886), born in the village of Takayama, Kōzuke Province, began to take an interest in sericulture under the influence of his grandmother. In 1855 he began to breed silkworms, and despite the many failures, persevered and finally achieved good results in 1861. He then began to develop his own breeding technique. He began to teach this technique in 1868, and founded the "Takayama Sericulture Improvement Association" in 1873. At the time, just after the Meiji restoration, the fledgling Meiji government was desperate for means of raising capital to fund the industrialization of Japan, and looked upon sericulture as a main export product which could bring in much needed foreign currency. Kōzuke Province, by now known as "Gunma Prefecture" had been noted for sericulture from ancient times but there was a pressing need to increase production and quality.

Takayama perfected his Seion-iku (清 温 育) technique which combined the traditional Ondan-iku (温暖 育) breeding technique, based on the artificial control of temperature and humidity, and the Seiryō-iku (清涼 育) breeding technique, based on natural ventilation between 1883 and 1884, and this became the standard method of breeding silkworms. Takayama turned the association over to his son in 1886 due to illness. The company director, Machida Kikujirō, transferred the company to its present location and founded the Takayama-sha Private Kōshu Takayama Sericultural School (私立 甲 種 高山 社 蚕業 学校, Shiritsu Kōshu Takayama-sha Sangyō Gakkō) in 1901. By 1905, there were 68 branches in Gunma Prefecture, and 54 in other parts of the Japanese Empire, (including Taiwan and Korea). School instructors are sent across the country and overseas. In 1907, there were 765 employees on mission in Japan and abroad, including 406 in the Tōhoku region alone. At the time, the Takayama-sha school was so ubiquitous that it was given the nickname “National Temple of Sericulture” (「全国 の 養蚕 の 総 本 山」). One of the graduates of the school, Senju Niwaya designed the refrigeration warehouses of Arafune (National Historic Site since 2010) after discovering and wind caves from which cold wind conducive to the storage of silkworm eggs was produced naturally due to unique geographic conditions. The school fell into decline in the Taisho period and closed in 1927.

The current main school building dates from 1891 and was built by Takayama Chōgorō's son-in-law. It contains two floors and pierced with three raised roofs (yagura) for ventilation. Preserved from Takayama's old residence is an Edo period Nagaya-mon gate and mulberry-leaf storehouse.

== See also ==
- List of Historic Sites of Japan (Gunma)
