= Tajima Yahei Sericulture Farm =

- 田島弥平旧宅
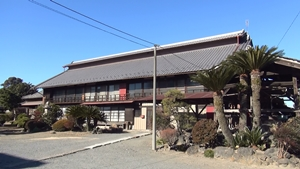
- Tajima Yahei Sericulture Farm main building

- Location within Gunma Prefecture Location within Japan

General information
- Location: Isesaki, Gunma Prefecture, Japan
- Coordinates: 36°14′47″N 139°14′20″E
- Opened: 1863

The Tajima Yahei Sericulture Farm (旧田島弥平旧宅, Tajima Yahei kyū-taku) is located in the Sakaishima neighbored of the city of Isesaki, Gunma. It was the former home of an influential silk farmer in the early Meiji period, known for writing a new sericulture theory which laid the foundations for modern sericultural production. The building has been protected as a National Historic Site since 2012. It was subsequently included as part of The Tomioka Silk Mill and Related Industrial Heritage UNESCO World Heritage Site in 2013.

== History ==
Tajima Yahei (1822-1898) is known for having published the “New Theories on Sericulture” (『養蚕 新 論』) in 1872 and the “Additional New Theories on Sericulture” (『続 養蚕 新 論』) in 1879. During the Bakumatsu period, he experimented with raising silkworms using natural ventilation, but gradually turned towards artificial temperature control. Initially unable to achieve satisfactory results, he experimented by trial-and-error, developing a breeding technique combining these methods, which he called Seiryō-iku (清涼 育) . In order to put his new method into practice, he converted his barn into a silkworm farm on two levels. After a first harvest, he took note of his mistakes and installed windows in the roof (Yagura) the following year to allow better ventilation inside. Observing better results, he further improved air circulation by installing a third stage. In his main residence, he had a single raised roof built over the entire length of the building, which was completed in 1863. The following year, the Tokugawa shogunate lifted the ban on export of raw silk, and the number of producers in Kōzuke Province increased greatly. Many adopted the same architectural style as Tajima Yahei for their farms.

Following the Meiji restoration, the new Meiji government targeted silk production as a major export industry for obtaining the foreign capital critically needed to fund Japan's industrialization. During an inspection of the silk-producing regions in 1869, the Italian minister plenipotentiary stationed in Japan, Conte Vittorio Sallier De La Tour and the secretary of the ambassador of the United Kingdom in Japan, Francis Ottiwell Adams, both praised Tajima's methods and the quality of the silk produced. Tajima's method was widely disseminated throughout Japan. Although towards the middle of the Meiji period his method was superseded by the Seion-iku (清 温 育) method of Takayama Chōgorō, (which also controlled humidity), the characteristic yagura style of Tajima's silkworm farm design was not abandoned.

The main residence of the Tajima Yahei is preserved in its state of 1863. The building has two stories and a tile roof. It is the first Japanese silkworm farm to be equipped with a raised roof over the entire length of the building. This type of raised roof is pierced with openings, promoting good air circulation, and which was an essential part of the Seiryō-iku method. It was the model for the silk farms built in 1875 in the Matsugaoka Land Reclamation Area. In 1952, part of the main residence was removed, but the landscape is believed to have remained unchanged since that date. The mulberry leaf warehouse built in 1896 also remains. A historiographical study was carried out between 1986 and 1988, and in 2006 Gunma Prefecture and the city of Tomioka submitted the site as part of its application for World Heritage status to UNESCO. In the final dossier submitted in January 2013, it was one of the four associated sites with the Tomioka Silk Mill awarded World Heritage status.

== See also ==
- List of Historic Sites of Japan (Gunma)
- World Heritage Sites in Japan
- Sericulture
