= Robert Boyers =

Robert Boyers may refer to:

- Robert Boyers (American football)
- Robert Boyers (academic)

== See also ==
- Robert Boyer (disambiguation)
