= Casin =

Casin may refer to:

- Cașin, a commune and village in Bacău County, Romania
- Casín cheese, a protected designation for cheese products from Spain that are produced exclusively from three cattle breeds
- Casín beef, a protected designation for meat products from Spain that are produced exclusively from the Casina a.k.a. Asturian Mountain cattle breed
- Casin, a boy's name

== See also ==
- Casein
