= Tomioka Silk Mill =

Building in Gunma Prefecture, Japan

UNESCO World Heritage Site
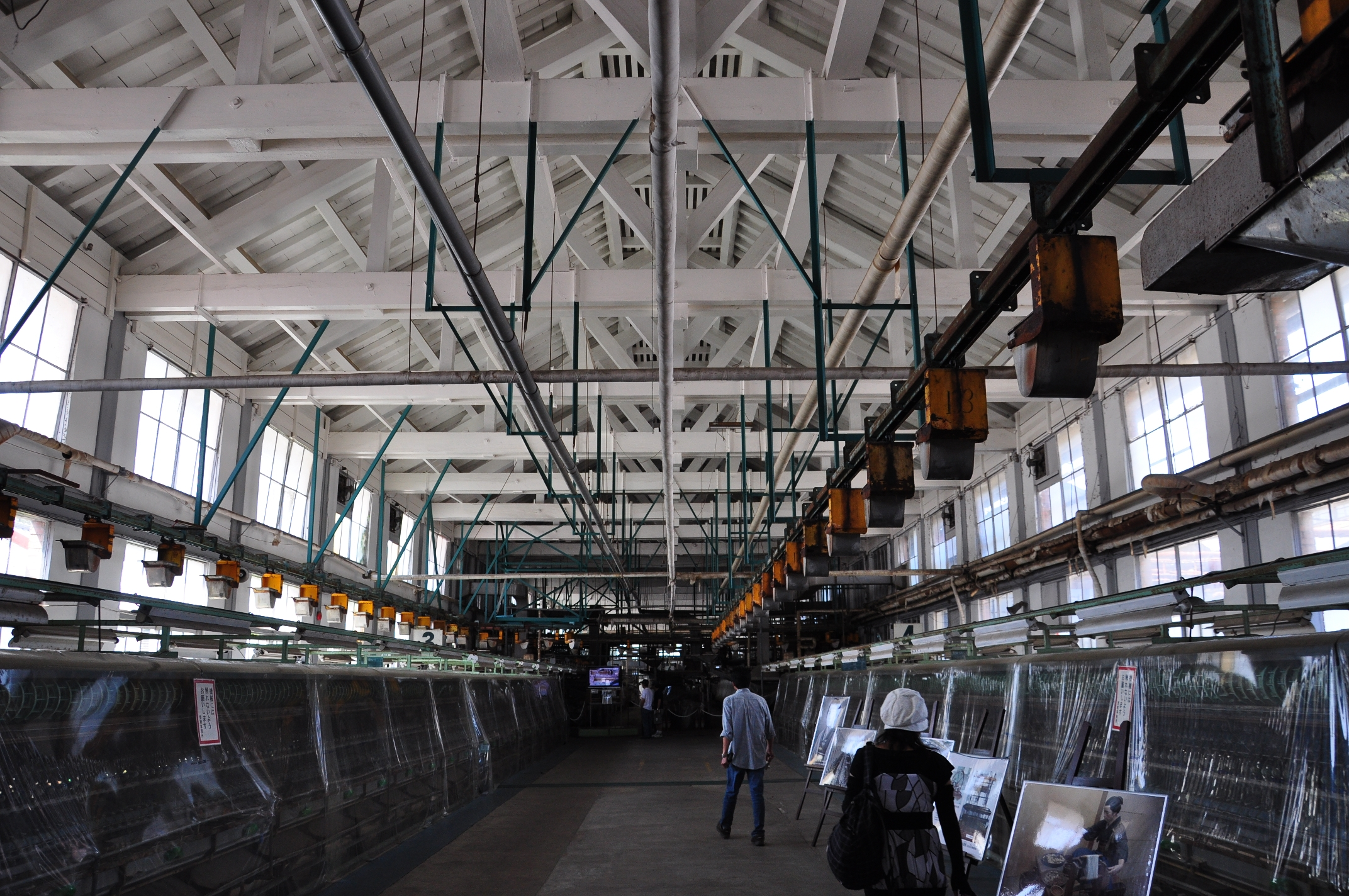

- Location within Gunma Prefecture Location within Japan
- Location: Gunma Prefecture, Japan
- Part of: Tomioka Silk Mill and Related Sites
- Criteria: Cultural: (ii), (iv)
- Reference: 1449
- Inscription: 2014 (38th Session)
- Area: 5.5 ha (14 acres)
- Buffer zone: 151.1 ha (373 acres)
- Website: www.tomioka-silk.jp/_tomioka-silk-mill
- Coordinates: 36°15′19″N 138°53′16″E
- National Historic Site of Japan Important Cultural Property National Treasure

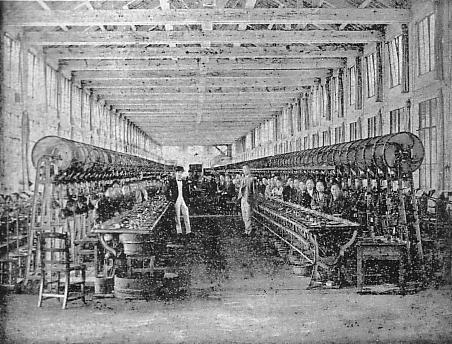
Inside Tomioka Silk Mill

Tomioka Silk Mill (富岡製糸場, Tomioka Seishijō) is Japan's oldest modern model silk reeling factory, established in 1872 by the government to introduce modern machine silk reeling from France and spread its technology in Japan. The factory is designated by the government as a National Historic Site and all its buildings are preserved in very good condition. It is located in the city of Tomioka, Gunma Prefecture, Japan, about 100 km northwest of Tokyo. It is also featured as the 'ni' card in Jomo Karuta playing cards.

== History ==
Following the Meiji restoration, the new Meiji government needed export products to raise the monies necessary for the industrialization and westernization of Japan. Goods which were already produced in Japan and which could be exported for good profit included tea, silk thread and silkworm cocoons. Especially with the spread of the silkworm disease called pébrine in France and Italy, and the turmoil in China caused by the Taiping Rebellion, Japanese silk was in high demand. In 1862, shortly before the Meiji restoration, raw silk and silkworm cocoons accounted for 86% for Japan's exports. However, soon after the restoration, overproduction, and the recovery of silk producing areas in Europe and China led to a drastic fall in raw silk prices. The Meiji government countered by changing its focus to silk products, such as silk thread and cloth, to increase the value of its silk exports. Foreign merchants had previously approached the government with offers to provide funding for a silk mill but this was rejected as the government considered silk production to be a critical strategic industry; however, Japan lacked the technology to construct a mill on its own. In 1870, a government-owned model factory, the Maebashi Silk Mill, was constructed with equipment imported from Italy and with a Swiss engineer to assist. It was only on a small scale and employed 12 people. Later the same year, leaders of the Meiji government, including Ōkuma Shigenobu, Itō Hirobumi and Shibusawa Eiichi approached the French embassy and were introduced to Paul Brunat, an engineer who was working as a raw silk inspector in Yokohama to oversee a project to construct a much larger facility.

Brunat in turn hired Edmond Auguste Bastan to create a blueprint for the design of the silk mill, which was completed at the end of December 1870. Bastan was able to complete the design such a short period as he had previously designed the Yokosuka ironworks and was familiar with made of timber-framed brick buildings. Brunat returned to France on to purchase equipment and hire engineers. In the interim, Odaka Atsutada was placed in charge of the Japanese side and started procuring materials, and in March 1871, construction started. Brick was not yet in common use, so a brick kiln had to be constructed in what is now Kanra, Gunma where clay of the appropriate quality had been found.

The Tomioka Silk Mill started operations on November 4, 1872. However, due to the shortage of female workers, about 210 female workers initially operated with half of the total reeling machine. The Westerners on site was seen drinking red wine; after that, unfounded rumors spread that they lived off of blood drained from the Japanese workers, which scared off many potential workers. Odaka was then forced to hire his own daughter to help dispel these rumors. As of January of the following year, there were 404 workers, mainly daughters of former samurai. The number of workers in April 1873 had increased to 556. The life of the workers has been recorded in the diary of one, Wada Ei.

=== As a government factory ===
The Tomioka Silk Mill is a huge timber-framed brick building, containing 300 reels. The largest plants in France and Italy had up to 150 reels, so the Tomioka Mill was one of the largest in the world at the time of its completion. The reels also incorporated a rewinding process called re-rolling, where the raw silk was re-wound from a small frame into a larger frame. This was done as Brunat wanted to mechanically imitate the processes which Japanese craftsmen had formerly done by hand. In the case of the humid Japanese climate, once the raw silk was wound, sericin could cause the silk threads to stick together. The rewinding process, which was not necessary in the drier European climates, prevented this. Another point which Brunat took into account when special-ordering the reeling equipment in Europe was the smaller stature of the Japanese women who operated the machines.

The working environment at the Tomioka Silk Mill was progressive for its time. Brunat introduced eight-hour working days, Sunday holidays and ten-day holidays mid-year and at year-end. The workers were provided with uniforms, and as the prefectural governor, Katori Motohiko was enthusiastic on education, the women workers had access to an elementary school. However, worker turnover was high, as there was considerable social pressure against women working in a factory, and friction between women from different social classes forced to work side by side. Many workers left within three years of employment, and the need to keep training new worked added to the mill's expenses. Workers were graded according to their skill level, with a system of eight ranks introduced in 1873. Silk produced at the mill received a second place award at the 1873 Vienna World's Fair, and "Tomioka silk" became a brand name. Workers from Tomioka were also sent, or otherwise found employment at other privately owned silk mills which were subsequently built in Japan.

Brunat and other foreign engineers employed at Tomioka left at the end of 1875 when their contracts expired, and thereafter the mill was managed only by Japanese. Odaka came into conflict with his government overseers and was forced to retire in November 1876 as well, but by this time the mill was showing good profits, and in the following year, direct exports to France by Mitsui & Co. began. Plans to privatize the mill was delayed when cabinet minister Matsukata Masayoshi visited the Exposition Universelle (1878) in Paris as was told that the quality of silk from Tomioka had deteriorated considerably. On his return, Matsukata fired Odaka's successor, Yamada Noriyuki, who had been hindering reforms, and attempt to install a former official from the Home Ministry, Hayami Kenzo, as his successor. Hayami had become president of a company exporting silk, and was a strong proponent of privatization. He agreed to rent the Tomioka Silk Mill for a five-year period, but this was strenuously opposed by the Gunma Prefectural government. By 1884, when most government-owned enterprises had been sold off, Tomioka Silk Mills remained in government hands. Due to its huge size, it was beyond the means of private investors at the time. Under its fourth director, Okano Asaji, a drop in silk prices worldwide plunged the operation deeply into the red. Hayami returned as director again in 1885 and turned the situation around by opening new markets in New York and by raising the reputation of Tomioka silk by increasing quality control.

=== Under Mitsui ===
In September 1893, Mitsui & Co. raised a 121,460 Yen bid and purchased the Tomioka Silk Mill from the government. Under management of Mitsui, a second women one-story factory was established, and new, more modern, reeling machines were instructed, All of the raw silk produced at the Tomioka mill was exported to the United States. A dormitory was also constructed for workers, although about half of the workers continued to commute. Working hours were also increased to twelve hours in summer and nine hours in winter. The elementary school was retained, but after twelve hour shifts, most workers were too tired to want to attend. Mitsui maintained three silk mills in addition to Tomioka, but the combined profits was not very large, and in 1902 Mitsui sold the plants to the silk merchant and entrepreneur Hara Tomitarō for 135,000 Yen.

=== Under Hara ===
Under the Hara General Partnership Company, the mill was renamed the Hara Tomioka Silk Mill in October 1902. One action take by Hara was to distribute silkworm eggs to sericulture farmers around the country free of charge with the aim of improving cocoon quality, and homogenization of cocoons. He also asked for the cooperation of the Takayama-sha, a sericulture educational institution with influence nationwide to improve yields. In addition, in order to retain skilled workers, he expanded on the educational and entertainment opportunities for his workers. Production was affected by World War I and the 1929 Great Depression; however, Hara was able to introduce more modern reels in the 1930s which greatly improved on productivity. In 1936, the company recorded a production volume of 147,000 kilograms.

Shortly afterwards, the company's situation deteriorated rapidly. With the outbreak of war in 1938, many silk mills around Japan went bankrupt. The factory manager at the Hara Tomioka Silk Mill committed suicide in 1938 due to disputes with the labor unions, and the development of nylon in the United States as a competitor to silk caused great concerns, as the United States was still the company's major export market. The Hara General Partnership Company decided to divest its silk-reeling business in 1938. The Tomioka Silk Mill was separated and became independent as Tomioka Silk Mill Co., Ltd. on June 1, 1938, with Takeo Saigo (son-in-law of Hara Tomitaro) as representative director, but the largest shareholder, Katakura Spinning Co., Ltd., in charge of management.

=== Under Katakura ===
Katakura was one of the largest textile companies in Japan at the time, and had lost in the initial privatization of the mill to Mitsui & Co. in 1893. The mill was renamed to Katakura Tomioka Silk Mill and in 1940 recorded a production volume of 189,000 kilograms. However, the start of the Pacific War the following year had a great impact on its business. The factory was placed under government control by the National Mobilization Law with Katakura continuing the manage operations; however, its production was shifted to focus on munitions-related materials for aircraft or military use. The number of workers were drastically reduced due to the need for women to till fields as so many man had been conscripted by the army. Exports, which had been the mainstay of the mill since its creation, fell to zero.

After the end of the war, the mill was returned to civilian control, and it has escaped damage from air raids. From 1952, automatic reeling machines were gradually introduced and the factory was electrified. Machinery continued to be upgraded over the years and production reached 373,401 kilograms in 1974, the highest it ever reached. However, due to changes in society and the economy, the company faced increased economic pressures. The popularity of synthetic fibers, the decline in popularity of wearing the kimono in everyday use, and the normalization of diplomatic relations with China in 1972 leading to an increase in the imports of cheaper Chinese silk led to the company stopping production on February 26, 1987. The closing ceremony for the plant was held on March 5, 1987.

== World Heritage Site ==
After the factory was closed, the Katakura company continued to maintain the buildings at considerable expense for many years.The mayor of Tomioka City and the governor of Gunma Prefecture expressed an interest in preserving the site and promoting it to UNESCO as a World Heritage Site, and Katakura agreed to sell the site to Tomioka city for a nominal value in 2005. The site was designated as a National Historic Site the same year. The oldest buildings were designated Important Cultural Properties in 2006. Three of these buildings were designated a National Treasure in 2014. The site was listed on Japan's World Heritage Tentative List as "Tomioka Silk Mill and Silk Industry Heritage Group" on January 30, 2007. The formal nomination was accepted by the World Heritage Center on January 31, 2013, and it was officially registered at the 38th World Heritage Committee on June 21, 2014.

== Gallery ==
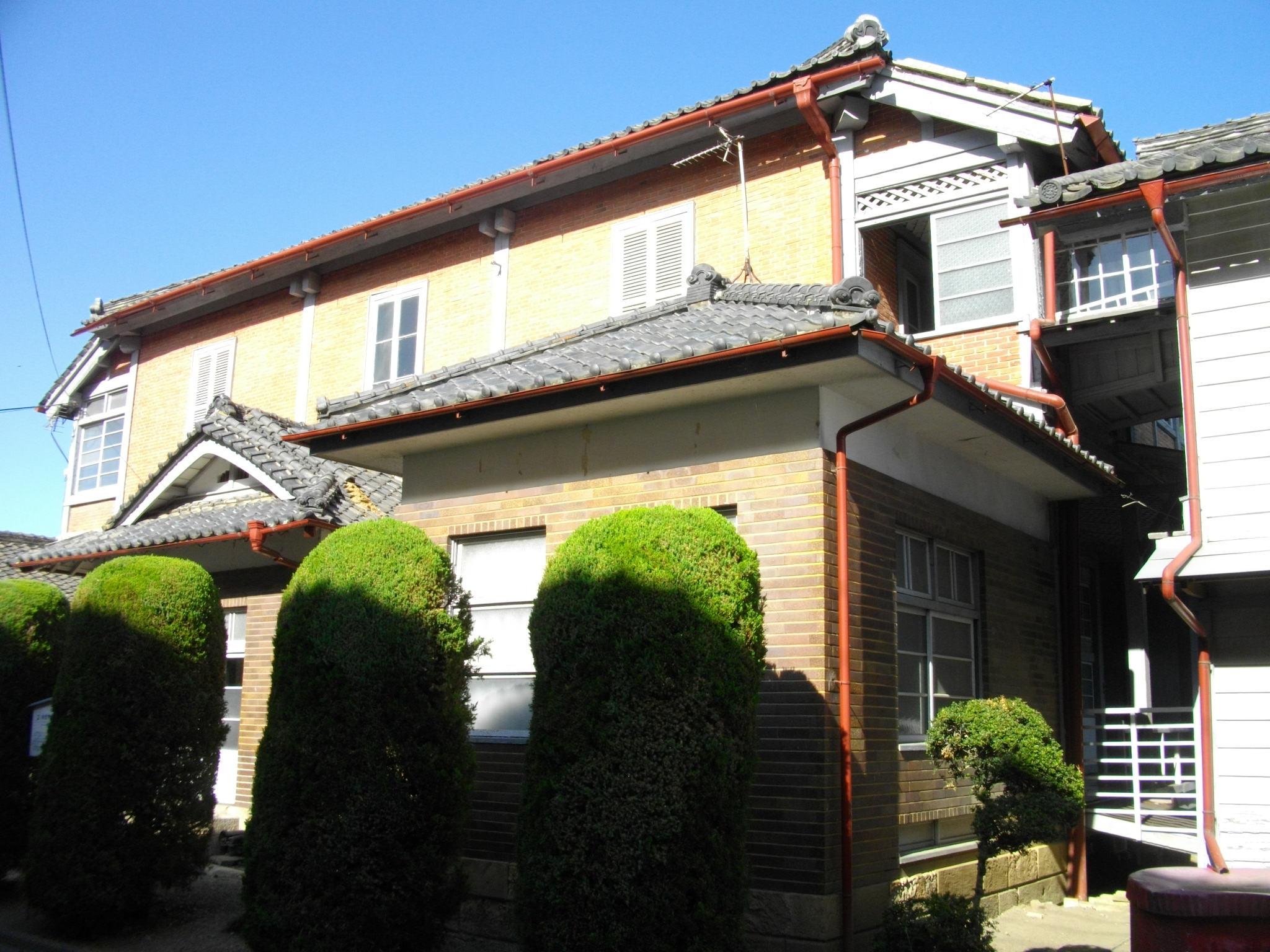
Inspector's House

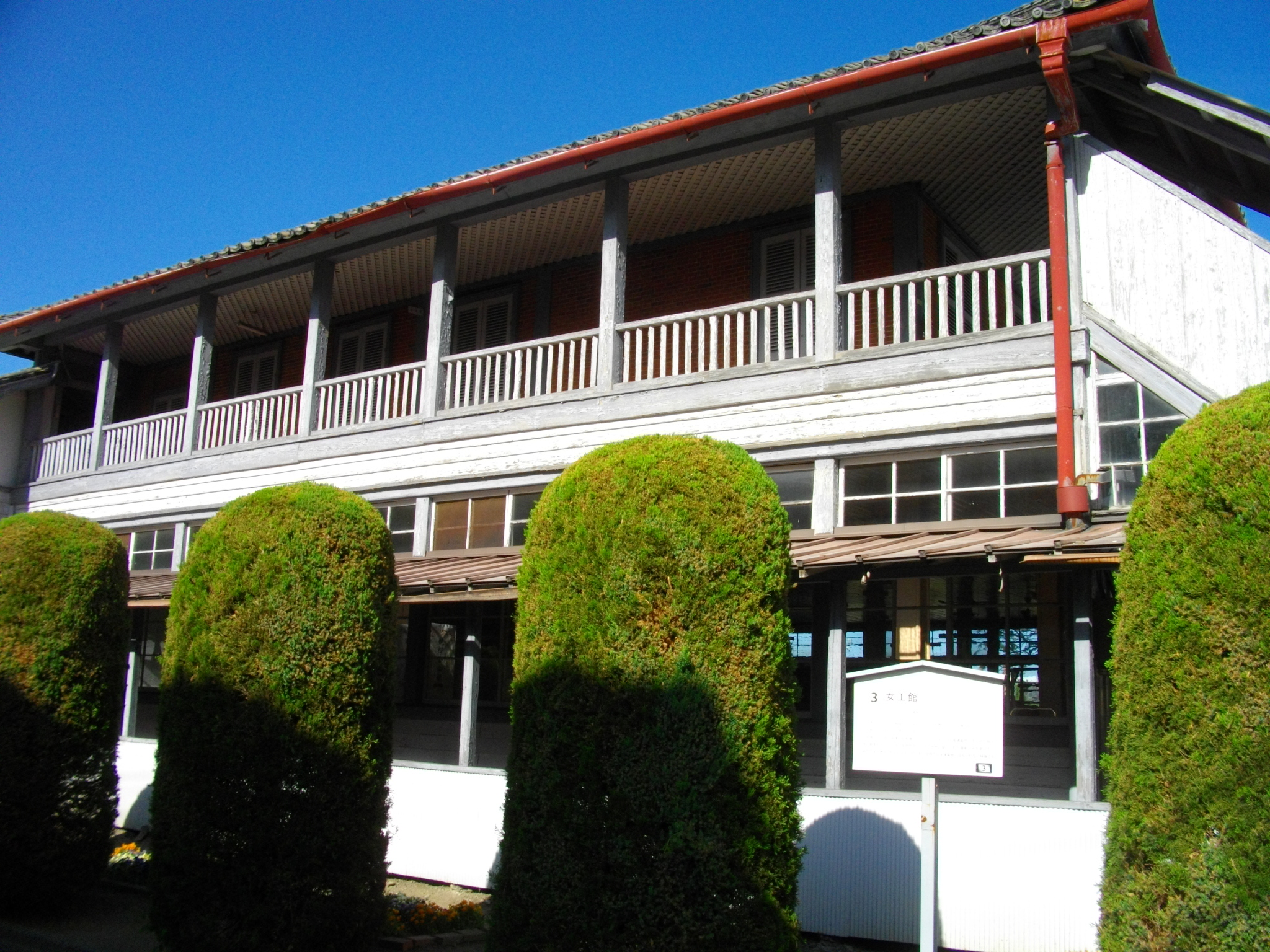
Dormitory for French Female Instructors

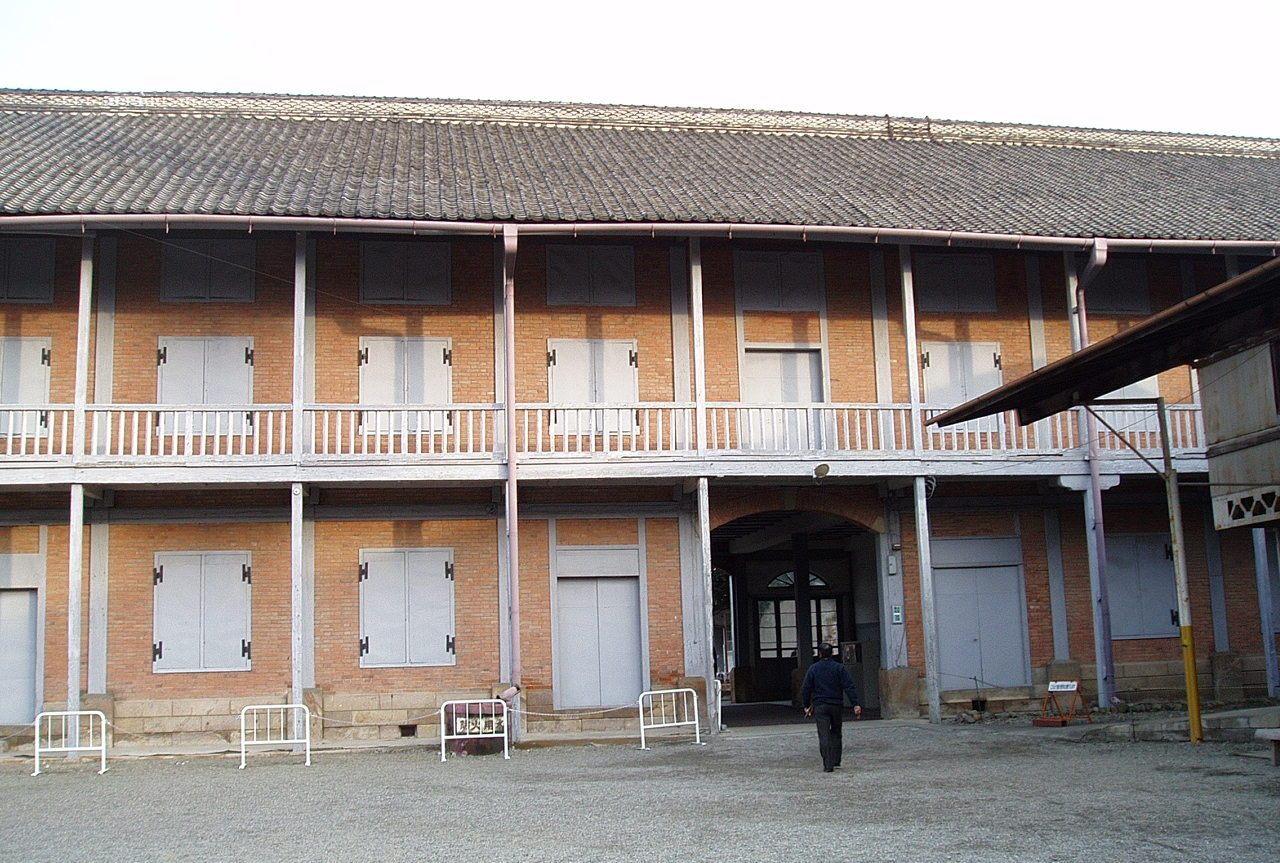
East Cocoon Warehouse

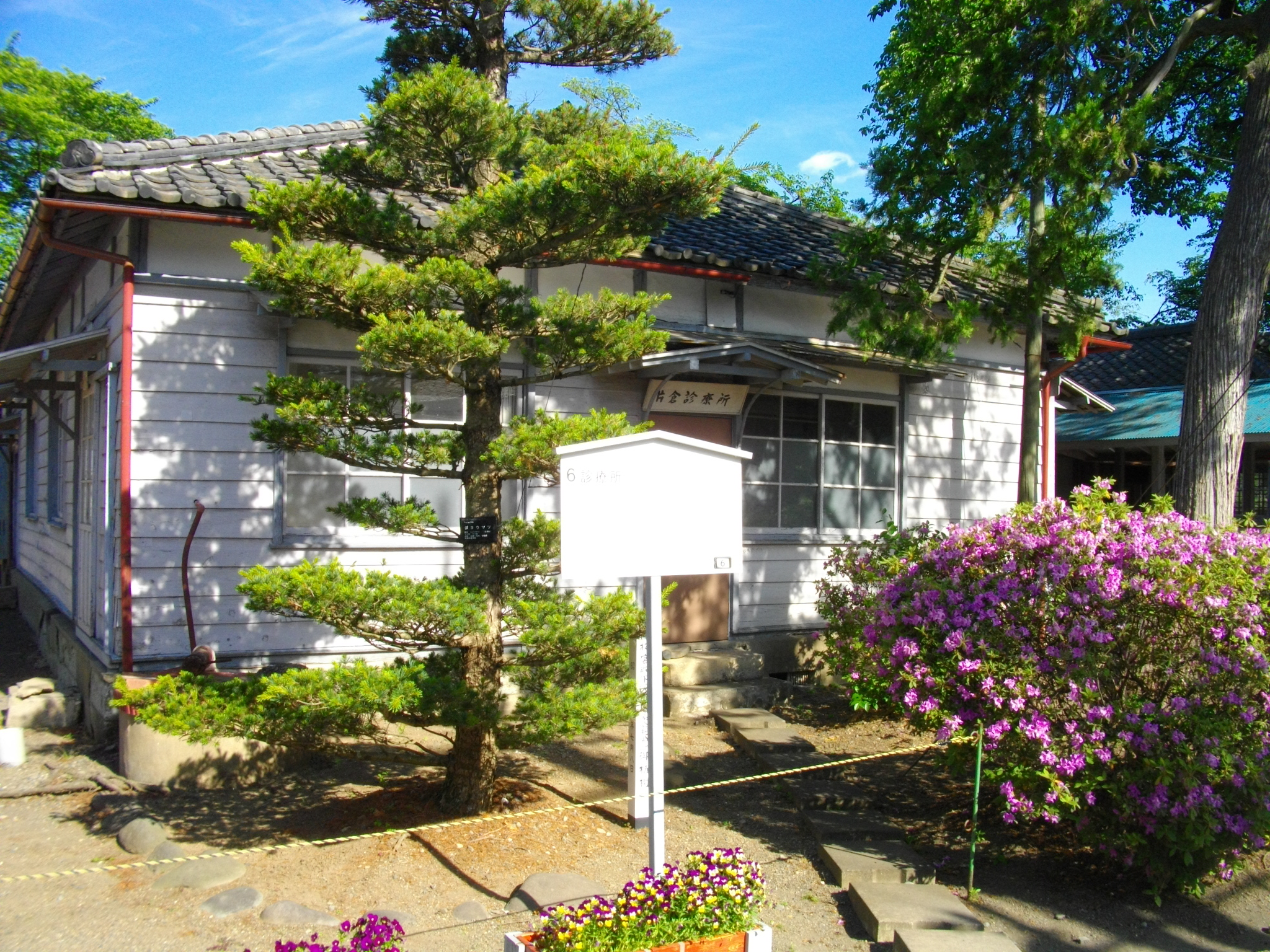
Infirmary

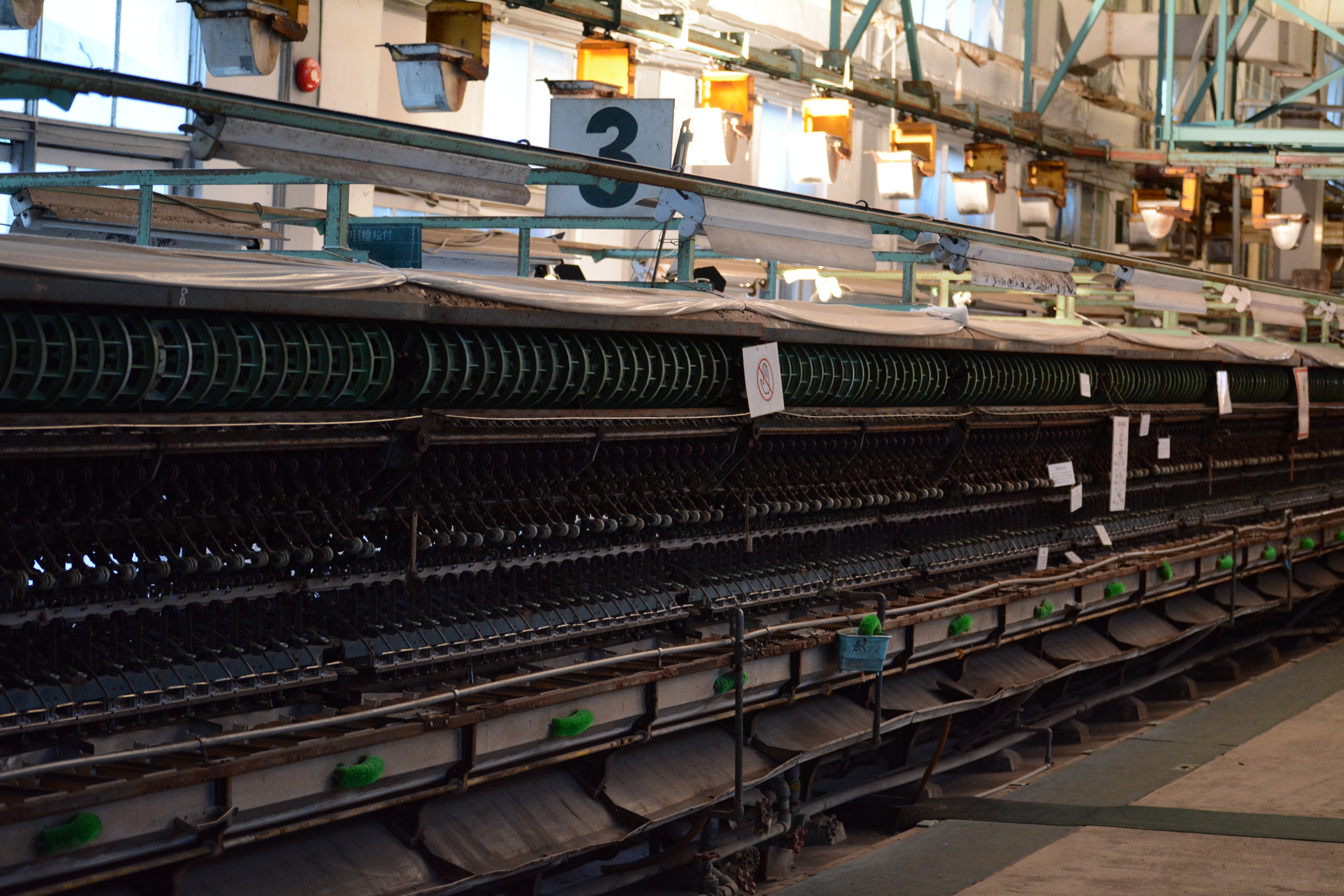
Machine

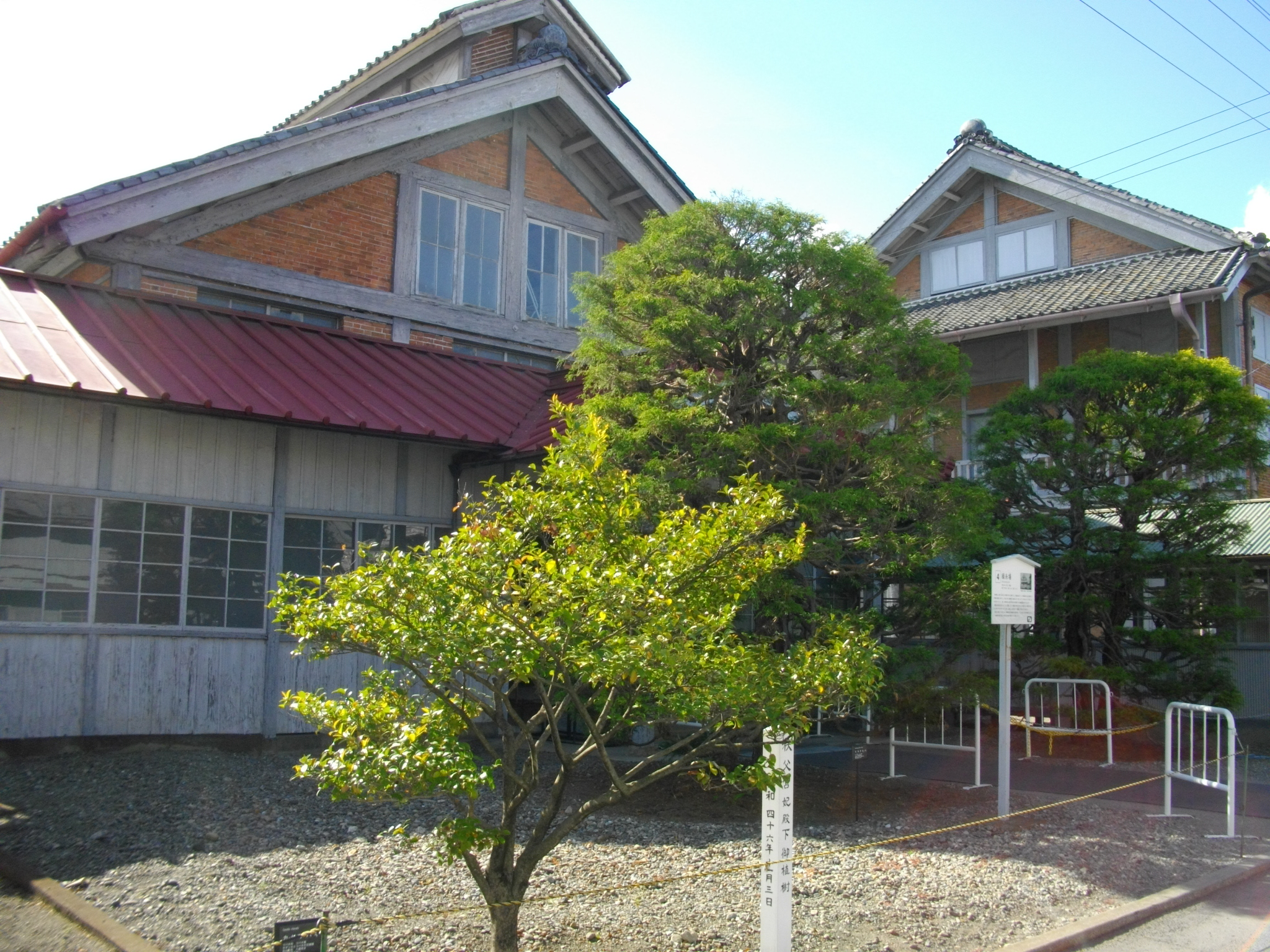
Silk-reeling Mill

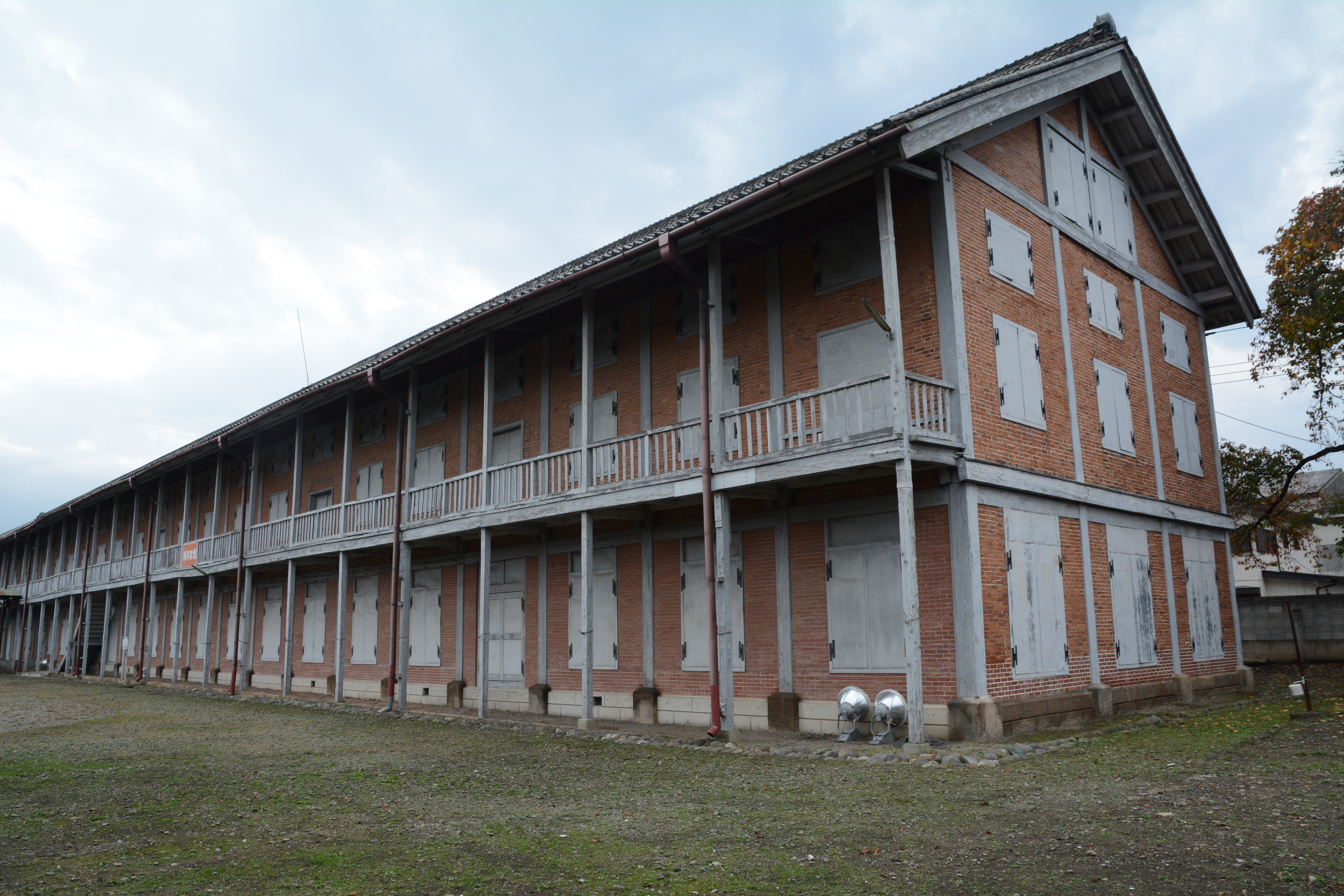
West Cocoon Warehouse

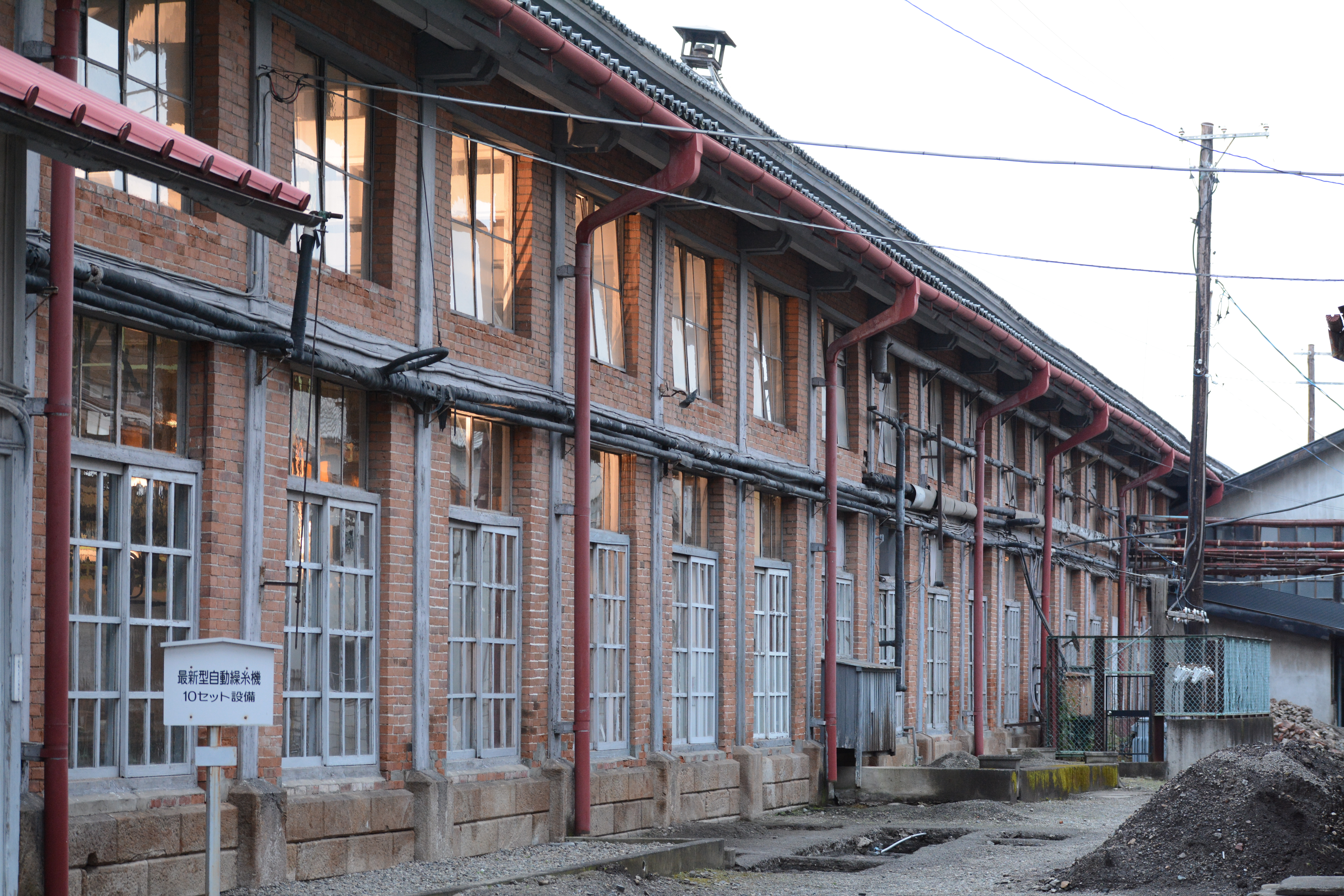
Silk-reeling Mill

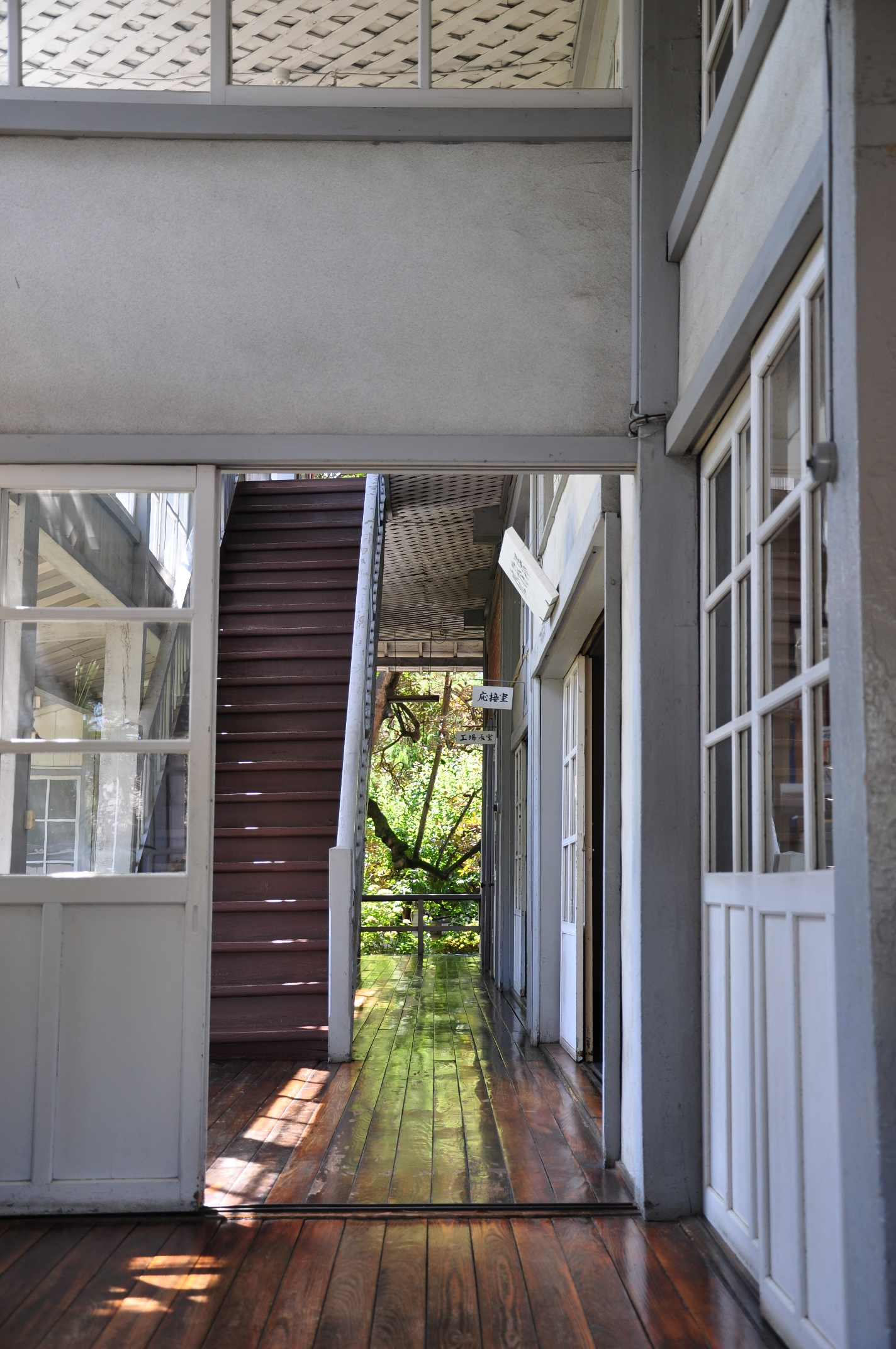
Office

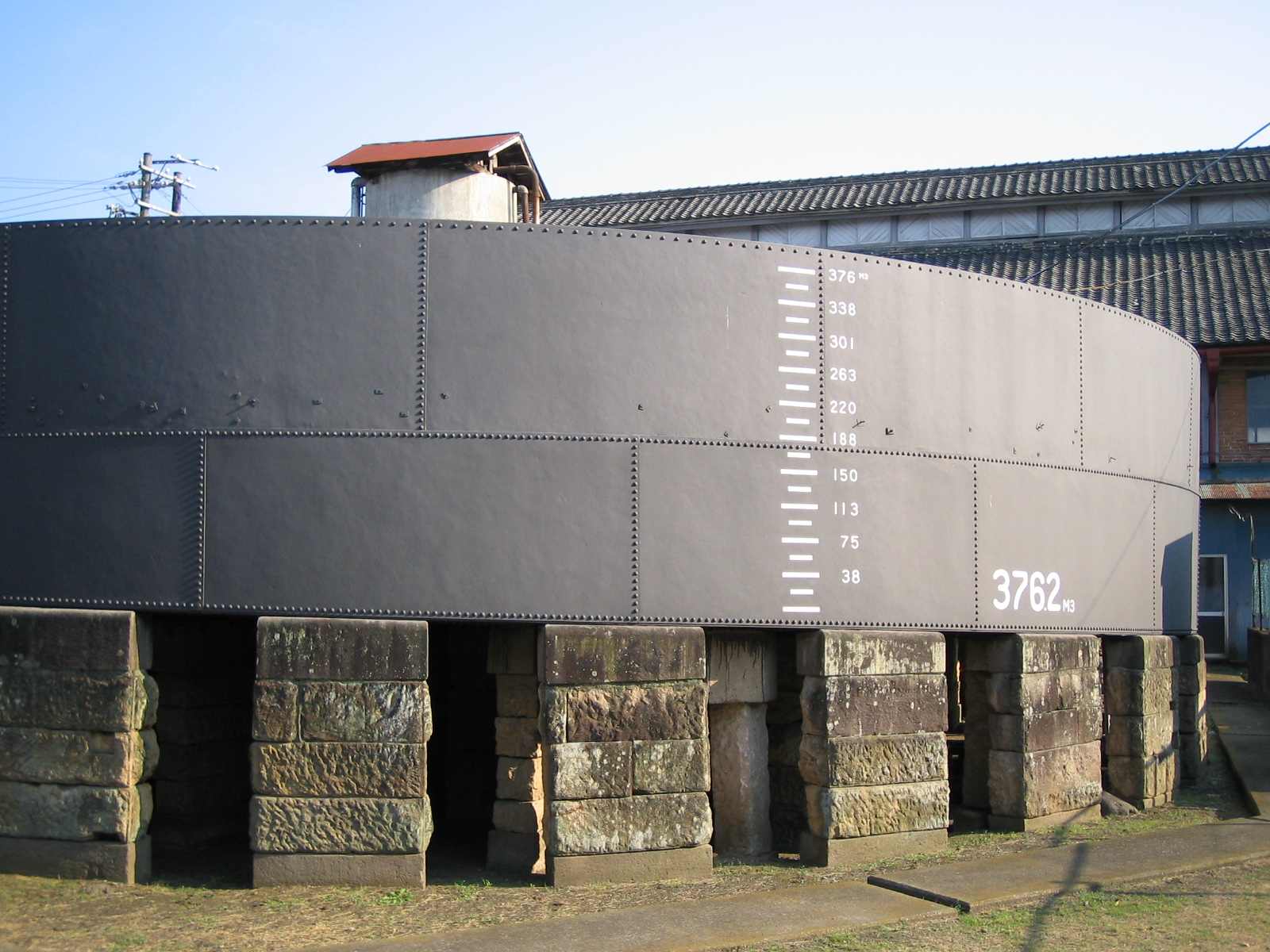
Water reservoir

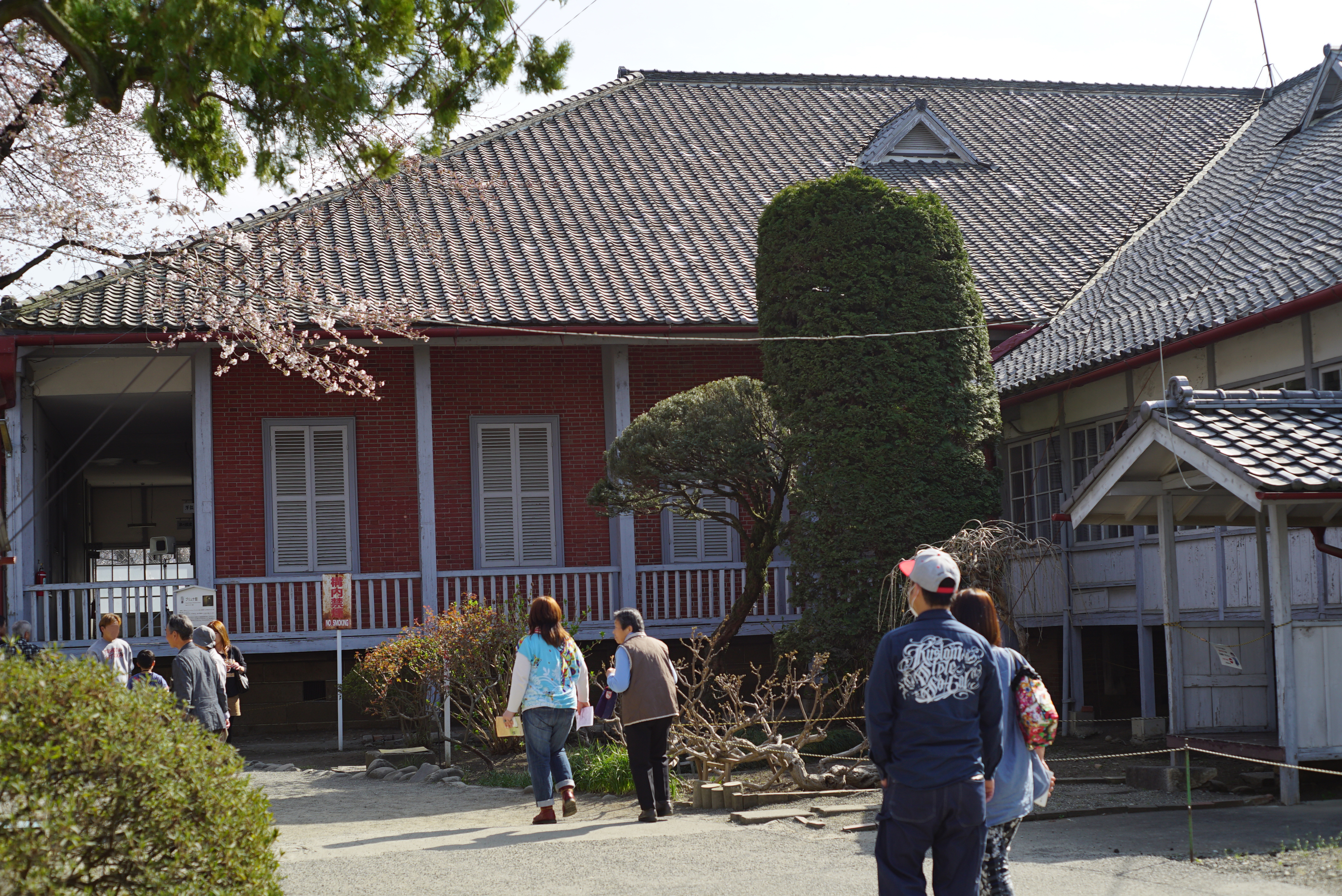
Brunat Mansion

The Important Cultural Property designation collectively covered seven buildings, including one iron water tank and one sewage ditch. The National Treasure designation covers three buildings: the reeling station and the east and west cocoon plants.

== Main buildings ==
- Silk-reeling Mill (National Treasure) - This was the heard of the plant, and is a long and narrow building made from brick with wooden timber framing. The building is 140.4 meters in length, with a door at the eastern end, and is lot by large glass windows imported from France. The 300 reeling machines Brunat imported from France were installed inside. Although these were later replaced with newer technology from time-to-time, the building was large enough and did not need to be modified. Some of the original machines were given to other silk mills in Japan, and one was preserved at the Okaya Silk Museum.
- East Cocoon Warehouse (National Treasure) and West Cocoon Warehouse (National Treasure) are boilings on either side of the Silk-reeling Mill, with the three buildings arranged in a "U" shape. Both buildings were completed in 1872 and are two-story brick structures with wooden framing, and a length of 104.4 meters. As the name suggests, the upper floor of both buildings was used for storage of silkworm cocoons and could hold up to 32 tons. The ground floor of the East Cocoon Warehouse was used for offices, and the ground floor of the West Warehouse was originally used for coal storage.
- Steam Plant (Important Cultural Property) - The steam plant was also completed in 1872 and was located just north of the Silk-reeling Mill. It is another timber-framed brick structure. The single-cylinder steam engine introduced by Brunat is called the "Brunat engine", and is now exhibited at the Meiji-mura Museum. It was the main power source for the factory until its electrification in the 1920s. The chimney to the west also dates from 1872 and is part of the Important Cultural Property. Only the base remains, as the 36-meter structure collapsed in a storm on September 26, 1884. The present factory chimney was built in 1939.
- Water reservoir (Important Cultural Property) - The iron water tank on the west side of the Steam Plant is formed by riveting iron plates. It has a diameter of 15 meters and a depth of 2.4 meters, and has a masonry foundation. It has a water storage capacity of about 400 tons and is the oldest existing domestic cast iron structure.
- Drainage System (Important Cultural Property) - The sewage system for the plant was a brick culvert running north of the Reeling Station from east to west with a length of 186 meters followed by a 90-degree bend and 135 meter extension southward to the nearby Kabura River. It is regarded as important architecturally as sewers incorporating Western architectural styles were rarely found outside the treaty ports at this time.
- Director's Residence (Important Cultural Property) - Also known as the Brunat Mansion. Completed in 1873, this one-story timber-framed brick building with a hipped roof was the residence for the Brunat family. The building has a floor area of 918.6 square meters, and as L-shaped, with dimensions of 33 meters east-to-west and 32.5 meters north-to-south. Due to its size, when Brunat returned to France in 1879, it was used to a school for workers afterwards. Although the interior was subsequently modified accordingly, the exterior is largely unchanged.
- Dormitory for French Female Instructors (Important Cultural Property) - Completed in 1873, this building was also known as " Building No. 2" and was another half-timbered brick a two-story building, and a hipped and tiled roof. It measures 20.1 by 17.4 meters and was intended to house the four women instructors Brunat hired in France to teach his Japanese women workers. However, one of the four, Marie Charet (age 18) left Japan in October 1873 due to illness. Clorinde Vielfaure and Louise Monier (age 27) also became ill and left in March 1874. The remaining instructor, Alexandrine Vallent (age 25) did not want to be left alone, and also departed in October 1873. The building later became used as a dormitory for company officials, and as a dining room.
- Inspector's House (Important Cultural Property) - Completed in 1873, this building was also known as "Building No. 3" and was another half-timbered brick a two-story building, and a hipped and tiled roof located to the east side of the East Cocoon Warehouse. It was originally the dormitory for the male technicians Brunat hired in France. The names of Justin Bellen (29 years old) and Paul Edgar Puller, and Edgar Prat (23 years old) are known; Prat was dismissed on October 30, 1873, because he went to Yokohama without permission. Several other technicians came at different times. An old map of the facility shows "Building No. 4" and "Building No. 5" in similar size and style of construction, but these buildings do not survive.

In addition to the above structures, the Main Gatehouse of the factory has been designated as an "attachment" of the important cultural property designation. This building is a wooden one-story building.

== See also ==
- Wada Ei
- List of World Heritage Sites in Japan
- List of Historic Sites of Japan (Gunma)
