= Fibrolane =

Fibrolane was the brand name of a regenerated protein fibre produced by Courtaulds Ltd. in Coventry (UK) during the 1940s, 1950s and early 1960s. It was made from the milk protein casein dissolved in alkali and regenerated by spinning the resulting dope into an acid bath using technology similar to that of viscose rayon production.

The fibre was produced as staple, tow or stretch-broken tow ("tops"), mainly for blending with wool. It had a warm, soft handle and could be converted into fine yarns and soft fabrics. Small amounts of Fibrolane could be added to wool to improve the efficiency of felt production.
