= Azlon =

Synthetic textile fiber composed of protein material derived from natural sources

Azlon is a synthetic textile fiber composed of protein material derived from natural sources such as soy, peanut, milk or corn. Currently it is used in clothing.

== Regulation ==
=== Canada ===
Under the Textile Labeling and Advertising Regulations, Section 26(f), Azlon is defined as any fiber made from regenerated protein.

=== United States ===
The name "Azlon" is regulated by the Federal Trade Commission, § 303.7(g) Rules and Regulations Under the Textile Fiber Products Identification Act. However, there is currently no domestic production.

Azlon is the common generic name for all man-made protein fibers. Aralac was a registered trademark of Aralac, Inc., a division of National Dairy Products Corporation. Its production from unrationed skimmed-milk supplies may have contributed to its popularization during the Second World War.

=== United Kingdom ===
Azlon is also a brand of plastic labware. It is a registered trade mark of SciLabware Limited.

== See also ==
- Casein
- Milk fiber
