= Wada Ei =

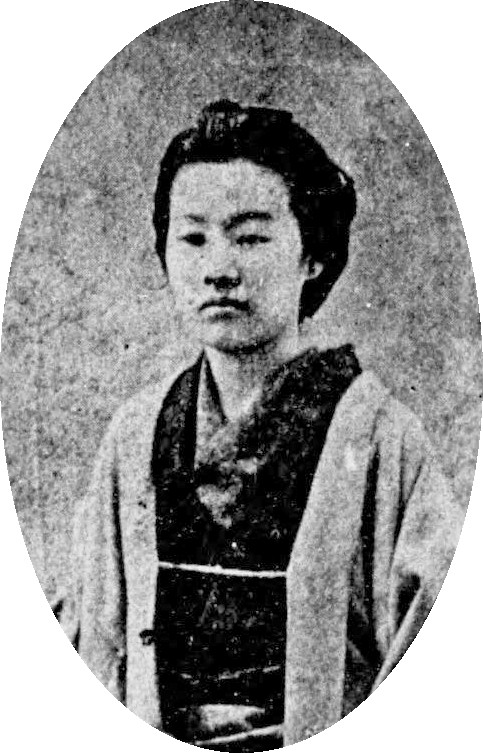
Wada Ei

Wada Ei (和田 英; 1857 - 1929) was a textile worker and memoirist during the Meiji Era in Japan, daughter of a samurai from Matsushiro, Shinano Province. She is known for writing a memoir called the "Tomioka Diary" (Tomioka Nikki) in which she chronicled her life among the female workers in the Tomioka silk mill.

She was among the daughters of samurai who were recruited in 1873, the sixth year of the Meiji period, from across the nation for practical training over a period of two to three years in the silk production process. They later became trainers in silk manufacture in their own prefectures.

Upon leaving Tomioka in 1874, the government awarded Wada and her colleagues medals and the special title "Women Spinners' Victory Battalion". She became a trainer at the Saijō Village Silk Reeling Factory (later Rokkōsha mill) in Matsushiro, Nagano Prefecture.

Wada married an army officer, who later died in 1913 from wounds he sustained in the Russo-Japanese War. She began composing the Tomioka Nikki while living at the Furukawa Mine company house at the Ashio Copper Mine, where her son was a manager. It was published after her death by him, leading some historians to doubt its authenticity.

== See also ==
- The Tomioka Silk Mill and Related Industrial Heritage (UNESCO World Heritage Site nomination)
