= Japanese silk =

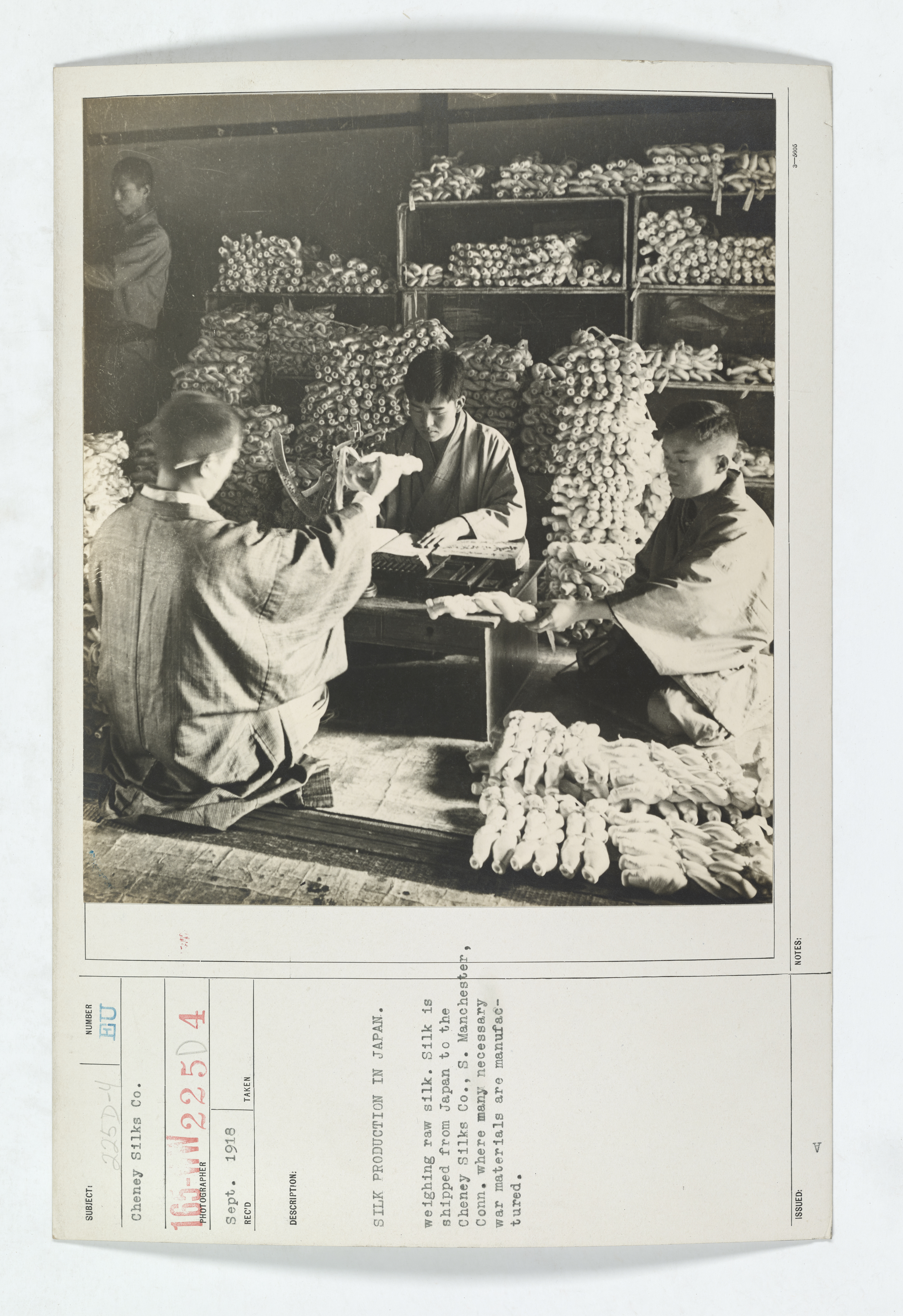
Silk Production in Japan - Weighing Raw Silk

Japanese silk is reeled silk produced from Japanese sericulture and silk reeling industries. Archaeological evidence indicates that sericulture in Japan has been practiced since the Yayoi period. The silk industry was dominant from the 1930s to 1950s, but is less common now.

== History ==
Japanese silk became dominant after the cotton industry collapsed in 1853, when Japan first opened its foreign trade that imported cheap cotton. Women laborers who worked in the early cotton processing industries shifted their reeling skills to the silk industry during this time. The Japanese silk industry reached its peak in the Meiji, Taisho, and prewar periods until the introduction of nylon.

In 1854, Japan opened its ports to foreign markets and increased its silk exports to international markets. Japan became a rising international exporter of silk because in the 1840s, there was a worldwide shortage on silk. In the European countries, Pebrine, a silkworm epidemic decreased silk output and in the Qing Dynasty, was engaged in the Opium War and the Taiping Rebellion reducing its manufacturing.

By 1868, silk accounted for nearly 2/3 of all export volumes in Japan and in 1912 of the Meiji Period, Japan became the leading exporter of silk in the world. The industrial reforms during the Meiji Period and the decline of the Qing dynasty contributed to the rapid growth of silk production and exports. During the interwar period (1918-1941), Japanese silk replaced the silk industries that collapsed in Europe during WWI (1914-1918) to become one of the main exporters of silk to the United States.

During World War II, embargoes against Japan led to adoption of synthetic materials such as nylon, which then led to the decline of the Japanese silk industry and its position as the lead silk exporter of the world. Today, China exports the largest volume of raw silk in the world.

== Government run mills to private run mills ==
As foreign demand increased in the late Edo Shogunate to the early Meiji Government era, zaguri (handspun) silk reeling had difficulties sustaining trade and produced low-quality silk that was not accepted in foreign markets. The Meiji Government took initiative to establish a modern technological silk factory named Tomioka Silk Mill and appointed Paul Brunant, a Frenchman who was a silk inspector, as the director of the government run mill. The mill was established in Tomioka City in Gunma Prefecture and it introduced Western technology in its construction, such as imported materials of cement, plate glass, and brick. Inside, French metal reeling machines were used and French foreigners worked as the mechanical engineers to support the operation. A total of 3,000 female silk workers from 30 prefectures were gathered at the Tomioka Factory so that they would eventually become instructors who would brought home advanced silk technological knowledge. These workers returned to their homelands to create or revamp local factories and model methods after the Tomioka Silk Mill. Under their instruction, these private factories improved the quality of their silk to be able to export it in the foreign market.

== Qualities of Japanese silk ==
Sericulture (the process of cultivating silkworms) were produced in Japan's regions with cold winters, limited flatlands and dry air. This included Nagano, Gunma, Yamanashi, and Hokkaido Prefectures. Silk would then be exported to foreign markets using the port located in Yokohama Prefecture. In addition to the abundance of women laborers, the geographical conditions, and the location of Nagano Prefecture, it became the leading silk producer in the Meiji, Taisho and interwar period.

Japanese silk specialized in thin and even silk, which was demanded by their United States customers. This was the case especially in the 1920s as thin silk was required to make beige stockings that American flapper women wore. Japanese silk workers used new machines and adapted new skills to achieve the ideal silk without irregularities needed for stockings. While prior to the late 1920s, silk machinery in Japan was not advanced of those of other countries such as Italy and France, because Japan was solely focused on increasing its output, in 1920, new machines were created to produce thin silk. These new machines include the seriplane testing and the denier scale. The seriplane testing device was used by shining a light against raw silk against a blackboard to check for irregularities and knots. The denier scale measured the silk's thickness for a certain length since silk cannot be determined by its diameter. However, silk reeling still depended on women's skills as new machinery only served as an inspection tool of their reeled silk.

== Social organization of Japanese silk mills ==
In the Meiji Period, while 25.8 million people were industrial workers, more than half of them were working in the textile field and were female operatives. These women workers who came from samurai, peasant, and poor families has been described as contributors to the modernization of Japan because of their work in international exports. This is because females at the time, were regarded as the ideal laborers for silk reeling because of their nimble fingers that were considered a kokuho (national treasure), that were able to perform delicate tasks of silk reeling that males were less suited for. Japanese males worked as an executives of the silk mills.

However, many female silk workers in the Meiji Period experienced harsh labor conditions. This includes being deprived of meals until their quota was finished or physical abuse from executives. Conditions improved by the interwar period, where silk workers earned considerable wages for their work. Those women workers who reeled high quality silk in the interwar period, were called "100-Yen Mill Girl," giving them status in the workplace.

== Japanese silk and modernization ==
The economic profits that silk exports brought contributed to the Meiji Restoration of Japan. Rural areas benefitted from new railways, stations, town halls and new shops that were funded from silk profits. New infrastructure helped urbanize rural areas near silk factories.

== See also ==
- Antheraea yamamai, wild silk moth species in Japan
