= Calcium caseinate =

Chemical compound

Calcium caseinate is one of several milk proteins derived from casein in skim and 1% milk. Calcium caseinate has a papery, sweet and overall bland flavor, and is primarily used in meal preparation and fat breakdown. Caseinates are produced by adding an alkali to another derivative of casein, acid casein. The type of caseinate is determined by the cation added alongside the acid casein. Other cations used to form caseinates besides calcium include ammonium, potassium, and sodium.

Calcium caseinate contains about 17% glutamic acid. Calcium caseinate is mostly composed of 3.5% moisture, 1.0% fat, 90.9% protein, 0.1% lactose, 4.5% ash, although this may vary slightly by manufacturer. Calcium caseinate is semi-soluble in water, contrary to acid casein and rennet casein which are not soluble in water. Sodium caseinate is more water soluble than calcium caseinate, due to its polarity.

== Physical properties ==
Caseins are found in milk which is held together by colloidal calcium phosphate. Calcium caseinate is generally stable at a pH above 5.7, and appears as a milky liquid. Casein can be resuspended by alternating the pH levels with NaOH or Ca(OH)_{2}, resulting in aqueous solutions of sodium caseinate or calcium caseinate. Most caseinates are capable of withstanding temperatures of up to 140°C (284°F), however calcium caseinate is influenced by heat with temperatures as low as 50°C (122°F). Calcium is a divalent cation, allowing it to form bonds with several caseinate anions. The binding of a calcium ion is able to reduce the electrostatic repulsion and induces a net attraction between caseins. This leads to the formation of several covalent bonds between caseinate anions, which can ultimately cause the cross-linked caseinate to form pockets of hydrophobic regions. Calcium caseinate forms visco-elastic suspensions which increase remarkably when increasing concentration (50–300 g L−1) and decreasing temperature(10–50 °C).

== Application in food ==
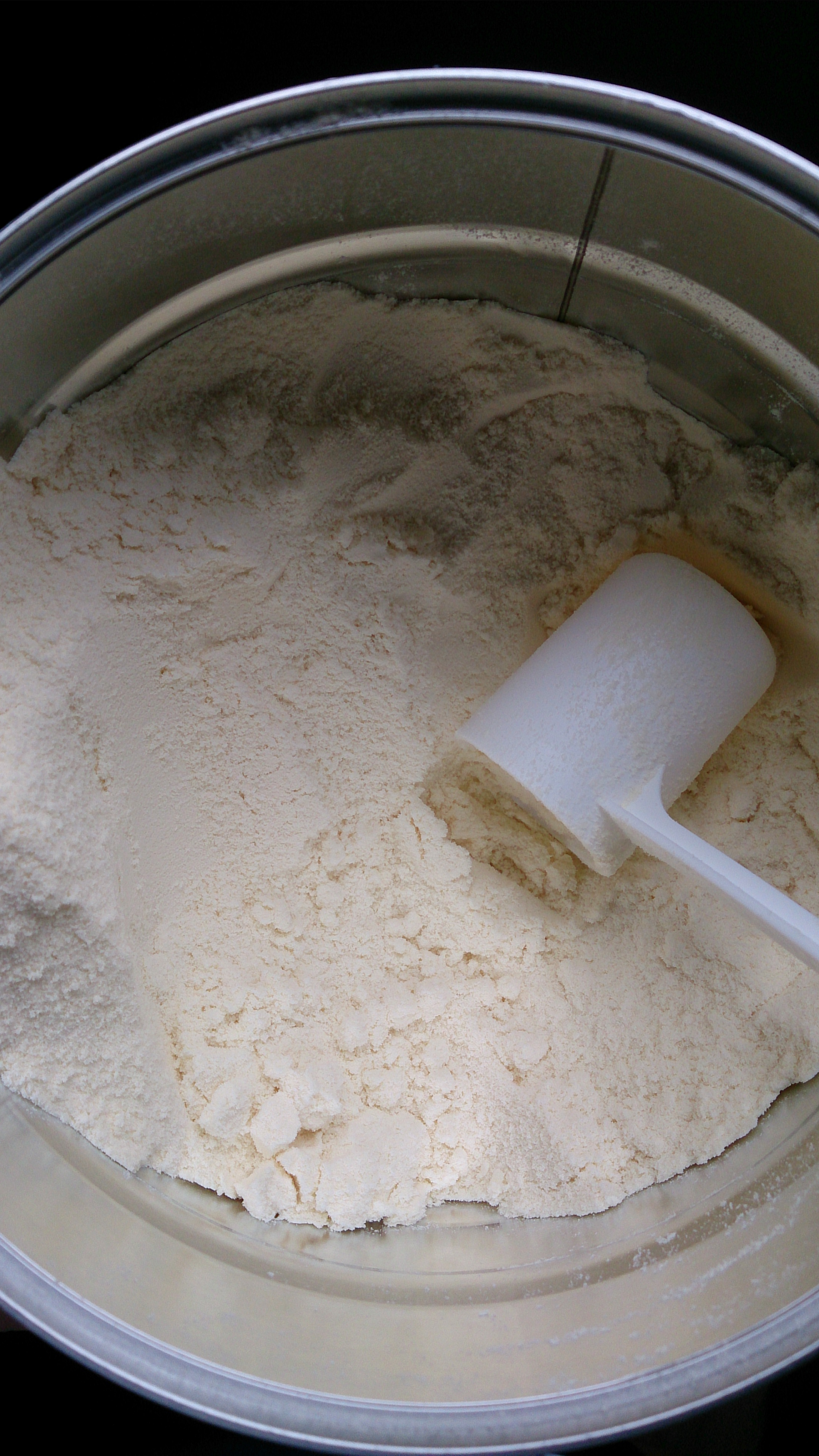
Powder milk

Several foods, baked goods, creamers, and toppings all contain a variety of caseinates. Calcium caseinate's applications include emulsifying and stabilizing fat and enhancing foaming and foam stability. Sodium caseinate is also used for these purposes; however, calcium caseinate is often preferred in order to increase calcium content and decrease sodium levels in processed food.

Calcium caseinate may be prepared in spray-dried (Scaca) or roller-dried (Rcaca) forms, which are used for distinct applications. Scaca can be found in dry milk powder, instant soups, medications, and instant coffee. It plays an important role in the conversion of fruit and vegetable juices into instant powders, instant coffees and teas, drying of eggs and dairy products such as ice cream mixes. Rcaca is mostly used in meat products and processed cheese.

== Effects as a supplement ==
=== Muscle mass ===
Caseinate, being a protein, supports the building of muscle mass and, in a study of 32 lab mice, was found to be more effective for this purpose than other proteins, such as soy- and whey-derived proteins. In that study, consumption of caseinate lead to higher muscle weight and less fat weight gain compared to the other two proteins.

=== Blood pressure and insulin regulation ===
Caseinate also affects triglyceride levels for those who are hypertensive. Calcium caseinate supplementation has shown improvement in several cardiometabolic risk factors, such as blood pressure, arterial reactivity, lipid levels and blood vessel function. Furthermore, Calcium caseinate can help lower central systolic blood pressure by improving endothelial function. This leads to better control of vascular relaxation and contraction, as well as blood clotting regulation, immune function and platelet adhesion. Calcium caseinate also has significantly lower insulin response compared to whey protein and maltodextrin, resulting in lower postprandial triglyceride concentrations.
