= The Tomioka Silk Mill and Related Industrial Heritage =

The Tomioka Silk Mill and Related Industrial Heritage (富岡製糸場と絹産業遺産群, Tomioka seishijō to kinu sangyōisangun) is a grouping of sites that relate to the industrialization of Japan in the Meiji period, part of the industrial heritage of Japan. The Tomioka silk mill was constructed in 1872 in Gunma Prefecture, which became a leading centre for sericulture, the rearing of silkworms and production of raw silk. In 2007 the monuments were submitted jointly for inscription on the UNESCO World Heritage List under criteria ii, iv, and v. Ten component sites have been proposed (listed below). Four sites were retained in Tomioka Silk Mill and Related Sites in 2014:

1. Tomioka Silk Mill
2. Tajima Yahei Sericulture Farm
3. Takayama-sha Sericulture School
4. Arafune Cold Storage

Site	Comments	Image	Location
Tomioka Silk Mill (富岡製糸場, Tomioka seishijō)	established in 1872 by the Meiji government; closed in 1987; Wada Ei described conditions in the mill; Important Cultural Property with eight designated structures; Historic Site		Tomioka 36°15′21″N 138°53′13″E
Great Mulberry of Usune (薄根の大クワ, Usune no ōkuwa)	the largest wild mulberry in Japan; Natural Monument		Numata 36°40′48.94″N 139°2′42.41″E
Arafune Fuketsu (荒船風穴, Arafune fuketasu)	cold storage facility for preserving silkworm eggs during the summer		Shimonita 36°14′48.79″N 138°38′7.76″E
Azumaya Fuketsu (東谷風穴, Azumaya fuketasu)	cold storage facility		Nakanojō 36°38′14.3″N 138°52′29.4″E
Birthplace of Takayama-sha (高山社跡, Takayamasha ato)	where a method of silkworm rearing was developed		Fujioka 36°12′12.7″N 139°1′55.2″E
Tomizawa house (富沢家住宅, Tomizawake jūtaku)	1792; silk farmer's house; Important Cultural Property		Nakanojō 36°39′45.3″N 138°51′19.7″E
Group of silk-raising farmhouse in the Akaiwa District (中之条町六合赤岩, Nakanojō machi kuni akaiwa)	Group of Traditional Buildings		Nakanojō 36°34′37″N 138°37′37″E
Old Kanrasha Obata-gumi warehouse (旧甘楽社小幡組倉庫, kyū Kanrasha Obatagumi sōko)	for storing raw silk		Kanra 36°13′54.80″N 138°55′5.78″E
Old Usui Pass railroad infrastructure (碓氷峠鉄道施設, Usui tōge tetsudō shisetsu)	designed by British architect C.A.W. Pownall; Important Cultural Property with seventeen designated structures		Annaka 36°21′29.43″N 138°41′52.78″E
Old Kōzuke Railway and facility (旧上野鉄道関連施設, kyū Kōzuke tetsudō kanren shisetsu)	light railway for the local silk industry		Shimonita 36°13′34.15″N 138°47′36.37″E

== See also ==
- Economic history of Japan
- The Modern Industrial Heritage Sites in Kyushu and Yamaguchi
- World Heritage Sites in Japan
- Sericulture
- Gunma Insect World
- Wada Ei
