= Robert Boyer (chemist) =

American chemist (1909–1989)

Robert Allen Boyer (September 30, 1909 – November 11, 1989) was an American chemist employed by Henry Ford who was proficient at inventing ways to convert soybeans into paints and plastic parts used on Ford automobiles. He is also the inventor of the world's first plant protein fiber.

== Biography ==
Born on September 30, 1909, in Toledo, Ohio, Robert Boyer first met Henry Ford at one of his frequent visits to the nation's oldest hotel, the Wayside Inn, in South Sudbury, Massachusetts, where his father, Earl Joseph Boyer, was employed by Ford. Ford claimed that the young Boyer had a “keen active mind” and was asked by Ford to enroll in the new Henry Ford Trade School and participate in its unique work-study program instead of following his plans to enter Andover Prep School and then Dartmouth College. Boyer excelled in the Ford Trade School, and took to exploring concepts such as how to manufacture synthetic wool from soybeans.

Boyer graduated from the Ford Trade School at the age of 20 with a promising chemistry career in front of him and began his career as the head of the soybean lab at the Edison Institute. Here, Boyer’s career took off. He started working on using soybeans in new ways for automobile manufacture, such as extracting lubricating and paint oils from the soybean and creating synthetic wool made from soybeans and pressing insulating varnish for starters and generators. One of his first projects, which began in 1932, included building “a small solvent extractor to separate the bean into soy oil and protein-rich meal”. The soybean oils became the most crucial commercial soy products on Ford cars.

In 1934 the five to eight coats of lacquer previously used to finish cars were replaced with a synthetic baked enamel paint which contained about 35% soy oil saving considerable time and money.

In 1937, Boyer developed a curved plastic sheet which he hoped would replace steel in the auto bodies of Ford cars. He demonstrated his confidence in his product by hitting it with an axe in the middle of a crowd of reporters and critics. He also jumped up and down on the curved sheet. People were astounded when there was no bending in the sheet or shattering due to the axe and the weight of his jumping on the sheet. This soy protein plastic sheet consisted of 70% cellulose and 30% resin binder pressed into cloth. The new rust-free, dent-proof plastic was reportedly 50% lighter and 50% cheaper to produce than steel. This new plastic body cut the total weight of the car from 3,000 to 2,000 pounds. The sheets had an appearance similar to polished steel, and could be bent but just snapped back into place, therefore when caught in fender benders, the fender would bounce back like “rubber balls”. This product is considered a breakthrough in the world of automobile production.

Boyer also used the soy isolates to produce the world's first plant protein fiber in 1938. This fiber resembled a soft wool, was tan in color, had a medium luster and a soft warm feel. It was advertised as “it has 80% the strength of wool, took the same dyes, had good elongation, and did not wet as easily as wool.” Boyer realized this fiber could be used for upholstery in cars, filling in felt hats, or clothing.

== Personal life ==
Robert Boyer was born to Earl Joseph Boyer and Ruth Marian Harris on September 30, 1909, the eldest of their seven children. By 1920, the family lived in Royal Oak, Michigan.

He married Elizabeth B Szabo in 1931, in Detroit, Michigan. The couple had two children in Detroit: Nancy Elizabeth Boyer (born 1932) and Robert Allan Boyer Jr (born 1934).

Following the death of his wife in 1963, Boyer lived in Dunedin, Florida until his death on November 11, 1989, aged 80.
