= Casein =

Family of proteins found in milk

Casein (/ˈkeɪsiːn/ KAY-seen; from Latin caseus, 'cheese') is a family of related phosphoproteins (αS1, aS2, β, κ) that are commonly found in mammalian milk, comprising about 80% of the proteins in cow's milk and between 20% and 60% of the proteins in human milk. Sheep and cow milk have a higher casein content than other types of milk with human milk having a particularly low casein content.

Casein does not appear to be essential in mammals. For example, the β-casein gene can be deleted in mice. The resulting mice are healthy and fertile, but the growth of their pups is reduced. Similarly, mice lacking the κ-casein gene are healthy, but they did not suckle their pups and failed to lactate, hence the gene is required for reproductive success.

Casein micelle sub-micelle model, from Horne

Casein is amphiphilic and therefore can be used as an emulsifier.

Casein has a wide variety of uses, from being a major component of cheese, to use as a food additive. The most common form of casein is sodium caseinate (historically called nutrose), which is a very efficient emulsifier. Casein is secreted into milk from mammary cells in the form of colloidal casein micelles, a type of biomolecular condensate.

As a food source, casein supplies amino acids, carbohydrates, and two essential elements, calcium and phosphorus.

While in animals it is only made by mammilian mammary glands (unlike some whey proteins), casein has been artificially biosynthesized. Animal-free casein proteins have been produced since at least the early 1990's using bacteria-based recombinant DNA precision fermentation genetic engineering, and has been in the process of commercialization by cellular agriculture for more than a decade. Plant-produced beta-casein has been synthesized at least since 2026.

== Composition ==
Casein contains a high number of proline amino acids which hinder the formation of common secondary structural motifs of proteins. There are also no disulfide bridges. As a result, it has relatively little tertiary structure. It is relatively hydrophobic, making it poorly soluble in water. It is found in milk as a suspension of particles, called casein micelles, which show only limited resemblance with surfactant-type micelles in a sense that the hydrophilic parts reside at the surface and they are spherical. However, in sharp contrast to surfactant micelles, the interior of a casein micelle is highly hydrated. The caseins in the micelles are held together by calcium ions and hydrophobic interactions. Any of several molecular models could account for the special conformation of casein in the micelles. One of them proposes the micellar nucleus is formed by several submicelles, the periphery consisting of microvillosities of κ-casein. Another model suggests the nucleus is formed by casein-interlinked fibrils. Finally, the most recent model proposes a double link among the caseins for gelling to take place. All three models consider micelles as colloidal particles formed by casein aggregates wrapped up in soluble κ-casein molecules.

The isoelectric point of casein is 4.6. Since milk's pH is 6.6, casein has a negative charge in milk. The purified protein is water-insoluble. While it is also insoluble in neutral salt solutions, it is readily dispersible in dilute alkalis and in salt solutions such as aqueous sodium oxalate and sodium acetate.

The enzyme trypsin can hydrolyze a phosphate-containing peptone. It is used to form a type of organic adhesive.

== Uses ==
=== Paint ===
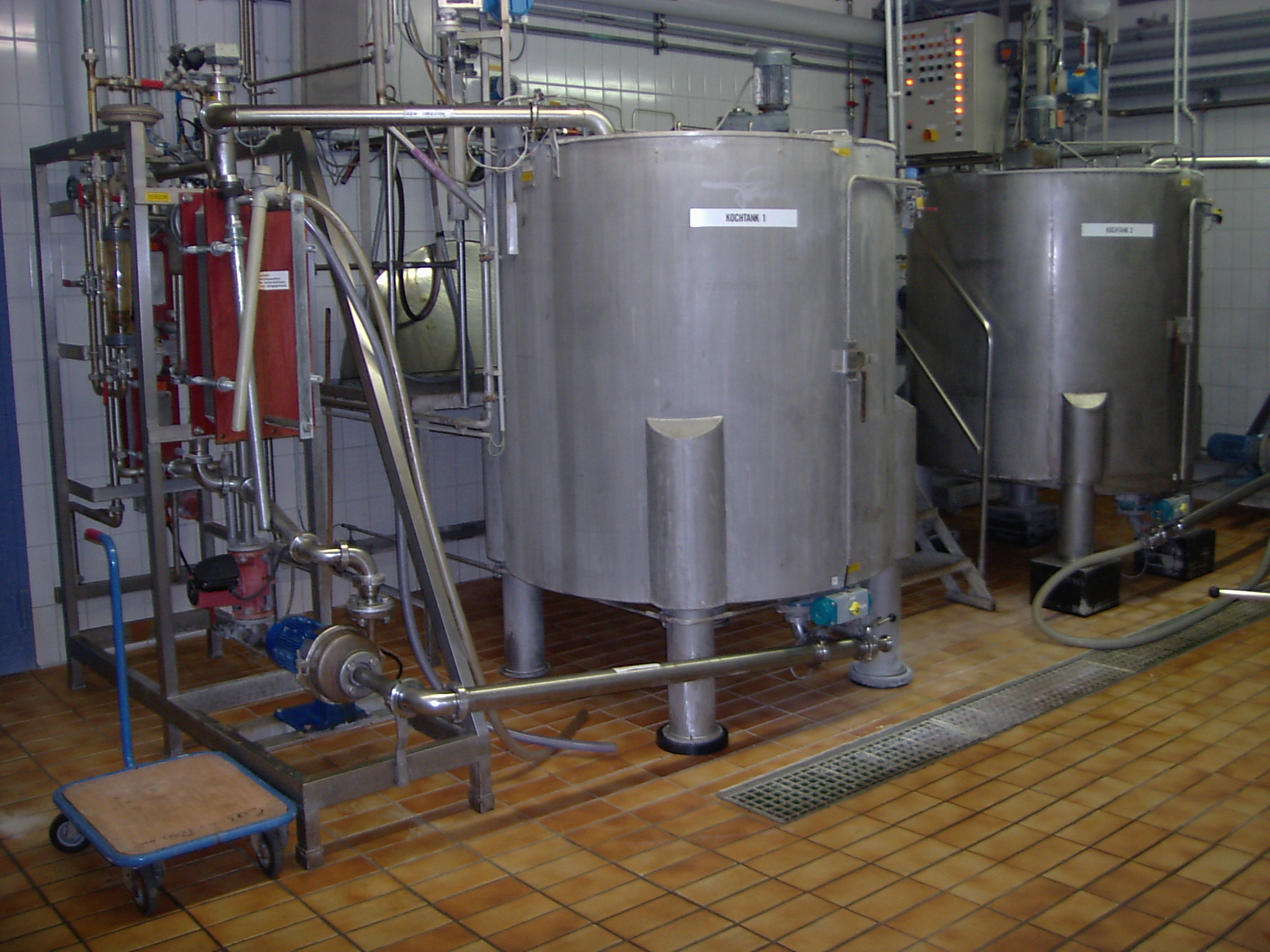
Casein preparation in an old etching operation in Müllheim

Casein paint is a fast-drying, water-soluble medium used by artists. Casein paint has been used since ancient Egyptian times as a form of tempera paint, and was widely used by commercial illustrators as the material of choice until the late 1960s when, with the advent of acrylic paint, casein became less popular. It is still widely used by scenic painters, although acrylic has made inroads in that field as well.

=== Glue ===
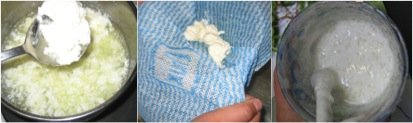
Preparing casein glue

Casein-based glues are formulated from casein, water, and alkalis (usually a mix of hydrated lime and sodium hydroxide). Milk is skimmed to remove the fat, then the milk is soured so that the casein is precipitated as milk curd. The curd is washed (removing the whey), and then the curd is pressed to squeeze out the water (it may even be dried to a powder). The casein is mixed with alkali (usually both sodium and calcium hydroxide) to make glue. Glues made with different mixes of alkalis have different properties. Preservatives may also be added.

They were popular for woodworking, including for aircraft, as late as the de Havilland Albatross airliner in 1939.

Casein glue is also used in transformer manufacturing (specifically transformer board) due to its oil permeability.

Elmer's Glue-All, Elmer's School Glue and many other Borden adhesives were originally made from casein. While one reason was its non-toxic nature, a primary factor was that it was economical to use. Towards the end of the 20th century, Borden replaced casein in all of its popular adhesives with synthetics like PVA.

While largely replaced with synthetic resins, casein-based glues still have a use in certain niche applications, such as laminating fireproof doors and the labeling of bottles. Casein glues thin rapidly with increasing temperature, making it easy to apply thin films quickly to label jars and bottles on a production line.

=== Food ===
Several foods, creams, and toppings all contain a variety of caseinates. Sodium caseinate acts as a greater food additive for stabilizing processed foods; however, companies could opt to use calcium caseinate to increase calcium content and decrease sodium levels in their products.

Caseinate Presence and Function in Different Products
| Product | Caseinate % | Type | Function |
|---|---|---|---|
| Cheese | 3–28 | Rennet (digested) casein, some products also add milk protein concentrate | Matrix formation, fat, and water binding |
| Ice Cream | 1–7 | Calcium caseinate from milk, added caseinate | Texture and stabilizer |
| Whipped toppings | 2–11 | Added caseinate | Fat stabilization |
| Meat | 2–20 | Added caseinate and co-precipate | Texture and nutrition |
| Pasta | 2–18 | Added caseinate and caseins | Texture, nutrition, and taste |
| Baked goods | 1–15 | Added caseinate and caseins | Water binding |

The main food uses of casein are for powders requiring rapid dispersion into water, ranging from coffee creamers to instant cream soups. Mead Johnson introduced a product in the early 1920s named Casec to ease gastrointestinal disorders and infant digestive problems which were a common cause of death in children at that time.

All caseinates have very efficient emulsifying properties and widely used to make emulsions in foods.

Casein is also believed to neutralize capsaicin, the active spicy ingredient of chili peppers such as jalapeños, and habaneros. Milk is often consumed to decrease irritation caused by spicy foods.

==== Cheesemaking ====
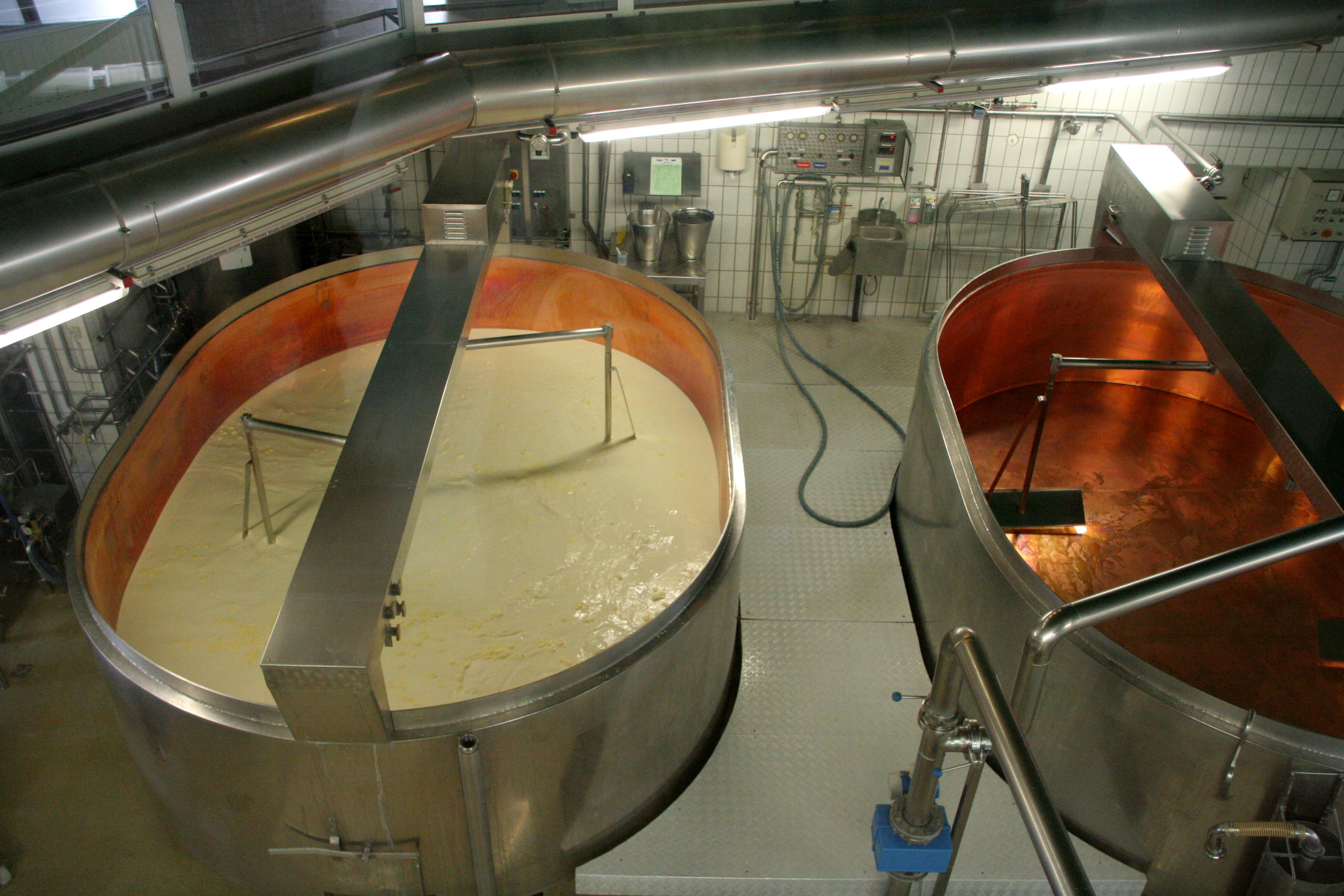
Cheesemaking

Cheese consists of proteins and fat from milk, usually the milk of cows, buffalo, goats, or sheep. It is produced by coagulation that is caused by destabilization of the casein micelle, which begins the processes of fractionation and selective concentration. Typically, the milk is acidified and then coagulated by the addition of rennet, containing a proteolytic enzyme known as rennin; traditionally obtained from the stomachs of calves, but currently produced more often from genetically modified microorganisms. The solids are then separated and pressed into final form.

Unlike many proteins, casein is not coagulated by heat. During the process of clotting, milk-clotting proteases act on the soluble portion of the caseins, κ-casein, thus originating an unstable micellar state that results in clot formation. When coagulated with chymosin, casein is sometimes called paracasein. Chymosin (EC 3.4.23.4) is an aspartic protease that specifically hydrolyzes the peptide bond in Phe105-Met106 of κ-casein, and is considered to be the most efficient protease for the cheese-making industry (Rao et al., 1998). British terminology, on the other hand, uses the term caseinogen for the uncoagulated protein and casein for the coagulated protein. As it exists in milk, it is a salt of calcium.

==== Protein supplements ====
An attractive property of the casein molecule is its ability to form a gel or clot in the stomach, which makes it very efficient in nutrient supply. The clot is able to provide a sustained slow release of amino acids into the blood stream, sometimes lasting for several hours. This also happens when milk is consumed by an animal: the stomach proteases cause it to form a gel. Cheesemaking using rennet (see above) replicates this behavior.

Casein is also a relatively abundant source of protein. One form (without the delayed-gelling property) is hydrolyzed casein, whereby it is hydrolyzed by a protease such as trypsin. This could result in quicker digestion or direct gel formation. Hydrolyzed forms are noted to taste bitter and such supplements are often refused by infants and lab animals in favor of intact casein.

=== Plastics and fiber ===
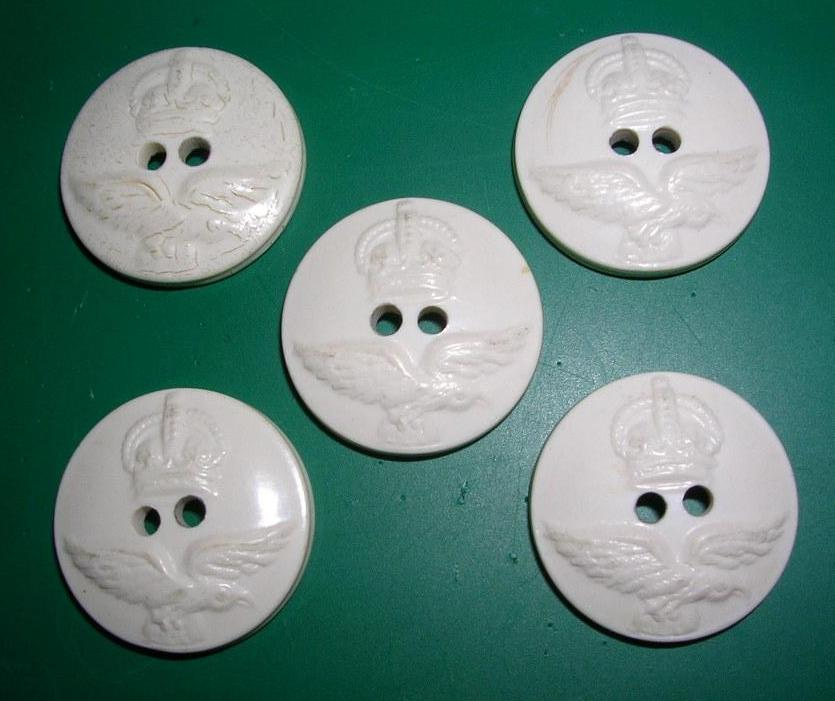
White galalith RAAF pre-1953 buttons

Some of the earliest plastics were based on casein. In particular, galalith was well known for use in buttons. Milk fiber can be made from extruded casein. Lanital, a fabric made from casein fiber (known as Aralac in the United States), was invented in Italy in 1935. This material, also referred to as milk cotton, is used in yarn production and can be made from a blend of casein and acrylonitrile, or in some cases, from pure casein.

=== Medical and dental uses ===
Casein-derived compounds are used in tooth remineralization products to stabilize amorphous calcium phosphate (ACP) and release the ACP onto tooth surfaces, where it can facilitate remineralization.

Casein and gluten exclusion diets are sometimes used in alternative medicine for children with autism. The evidence that such diets have any impact on behavior or cognitive and social functioning in autistic children was poor.

=== Nanotechnological uses ===
Casein proteins have potential for use as nanomaterials due to their readily available source (milk) and their propensity to self-assemble into amyloid fibrils.

== Potential health issues and effects ==
There is no good evidence that caseins in milk increase the risk of getting cancer.

=== A1/A2 beta-caseins in milk ===
A1 and A2 beta-caseins are genetic variants of the beta-casein milk protein that differ by one amino acid; a proline occurs at position 67 in the chain of amino acids that make up the A2 beta-casein, while in A1 beta-casein a histidine occurs at that position. Due to the way that beta-casein interacts with enzymes found in the digestive system, A1 and A2 are processed differently by digestive enzymes, and a seven-amino peptide, beta-casomorphin-7, (BCM-7) can be released by digestion of A1-beta-casein.

The A1 beta-casein type is the most common type found in cow's milk in Europe (excluding Italy and France which have more A2 cows), the United States, Australia, and New Zealand.

Interest in the distinction between A1 and A2 beta-casein proteins began in the early 1990s through epidemiological research and animal studies initially conducted by scientists in New Zealand, which found correlations between the prevalence of milk with A1 beta-casein proteins and various chronic diseases. The research generated interest in the media, among some in the scientific community, and entrepreneurs. A company, A2 Corporation, was founded in New Zealand in the early 2000s to commercialize the test and market "A2 Milk" as premium milk that is healthier due to the lack of peptides from A1. A2 Milk even petitioned the Food Standards Australia New Zealand regulatory authority to require a health warning on ordinary milk.

Responding to public interest, the marketing of A2 milk, and the scientific evidence that had been published, an independent review published in 2005 found no discernible difference between drinking A1 or A2 milk on the risk of contracting chronic diseases. The European Food Safety Authority (EFSA) reviewed the scientific literature and published a review in 2009 found no identifiable relationship between chronic diseases and drinking milk with the A1 protein.

=== Casein allergy ===
A small fraction of the population is allergic to casein. Casein intolerance, also known as "milk protein intolerance", is experienced when the body cannot break down the proteins of casein. The prevalence of casein allergy or intolerance ranges from 0.25% to 4.9% of young children. Numbers for older children and adults are not known.

Casein that is heat-treated has been shown to be more allergenic and harder to digest when fed to infants. Breast milk has not been shown to cause an allergic reaction typically, but should be administered to an infant with caution each time in case of adverse reaction from something the breastfeeding parent consumed that contained casein. Following a casein-free diet has been shown to improve outcomes of infants who are breastfed while allergic or intolerant to dairy protein.

Supplementation of protease enzyme has been shown to help casein intolerant individuals digest the protein with minimal adverse reaction.

== See also ==
- K-casein
- Casin (disambiguation)
- Dairy
- Milk skin
- Protein quality
- Beta-lactoglobulin
- Milk paint
