= Lactalbumin =

Whey protein

Lactalbumin, also known as "whey protein", is the albumin contained in milk and obtained from whey. Lactalbumin is found in the milk of many mammals. There are alpha and beta lactalbumins; both are contained in milk.

Targeted small scientific studies suggest that certain types of lactalbumin (whey protein) may improve immune responsiveness and increase levels of glutathione systemically in animals and which apparently possess antiviral (against viruses), anti-apoptotic (impede cell death) and anti-tumor (against cancers or tumors) activities in humans, but larger and better studies are needed to confirm these attributions.

== See also ==
- Alpha-lactalbumin
- Beta-lactoglobulin
