= Breastmilk medicine =

Non-nutritional, health-related use for human breastmilk

Breastmilk medicine refers to the non-nutritional usage of human breast milk (HBM) as a medicine or therapy to cure diseases. Breastmilk is perceived as an important food that provides essential nutrition to infants. It also provides protection in terms of immunity by direct transfer of antibodies from mothers to infants. The immunity developed via this mean protects infants from diseases such as respiratory diseases, middle ear infections, and gastrointestinal diseases. HBM can also produce lifelong positive therapeutic effects on a number of chronic diseases, including diabetes mellitus, obesity, hyperlipidemia, hypertension, cardiovascular diseases, autoimmunity, and asthma.

Therapeutic use of breastmilk has long been a part of natural pharmacopeia, and ethnomedicine. The effectiveness of HBM and fresh colostrum as a treatment for inflammatory disorders such as rhinitis, skin infection, soring nipples, and conjunctivitis has been reported by public health nurses. Currently, many breastmilk components have shown therapeutic benefits in preclinical studies and are being evaluated by clinical studies.

== Anti-inflammatory effects ==
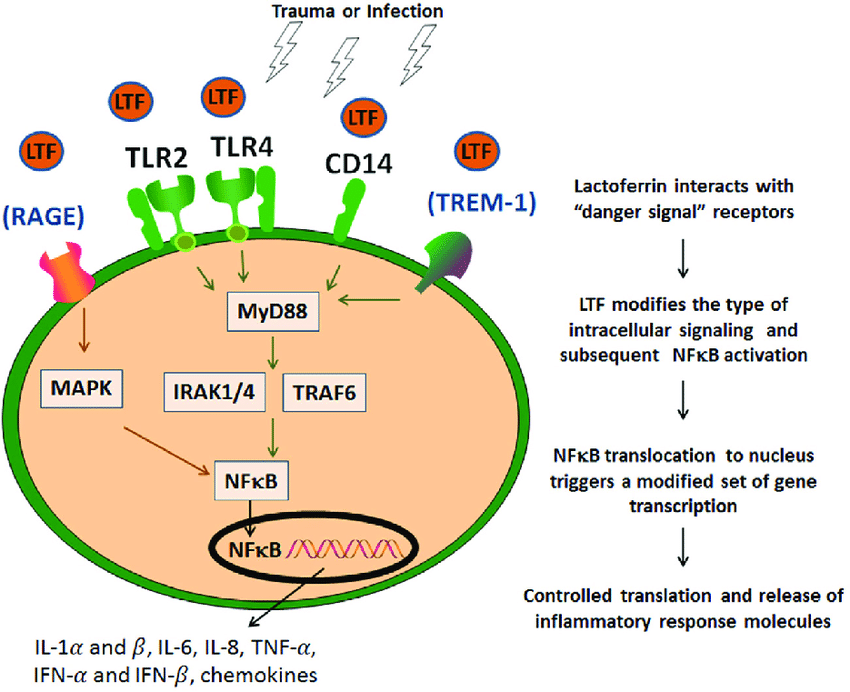
Diagram illustrating mechanism of action of Lactoferrin to exhibit anti-inflammatory effects.

HBM can be used to treat inflammations. Breastfeeding has an anti-inflammatory effect that is conveyed by its chemical components' interaction with body cells. The major chemical component that produces the anti-inflammatory effect in both colostrum and transitional milk are glycoprotein and lactoferrin. Lactoferrin has multiple actions including lymph-stimulatory, anti-inflammatory, anti-bacterial, anti-viral, and anti-fungal effects. The anti-inflammatory effects of lactoferrin are attributed to its iron-binding properties, inhibition of inflammation-causing molecules including interleukin-1β (IL-1β) and tumor necrosis factor-alpha (TNF-α), stimulation of the activity and maturation of lymphocytes as well as preservation of an antioxidant environment. Besides, lactoferrin protects infants against bacterial and fungal infections in combination with other peptides present in HBM.

=== Respiratory viral infection in infants ===
Lactoferrin in HBM can also inhibit the invasion and proliferation of respiratory syncytial virus (RSV), which is a virus commonly found in the human respiratory tract and causes mild cold-like symptoms. Lactoferrin can interact directly with the F glycoprotein which is a protein on the surface of the virus that is responsible for presenting the virus to body cells and causing infections.

Adenovirus is another group of viruses that targets the mucosal membrane of the human respiratory tract. It usually causes mild to severe infection with symptoms like the common cold or flu. Lactoferrin can prevent infection of adenovirus since it can interfere with the primary receptors of the virus. HBM regurgitation into the nose after breastfeeding is a way to eliminate these mucosal bacteria and protect infants against recurring nose infections in breastfed infants in the long term.

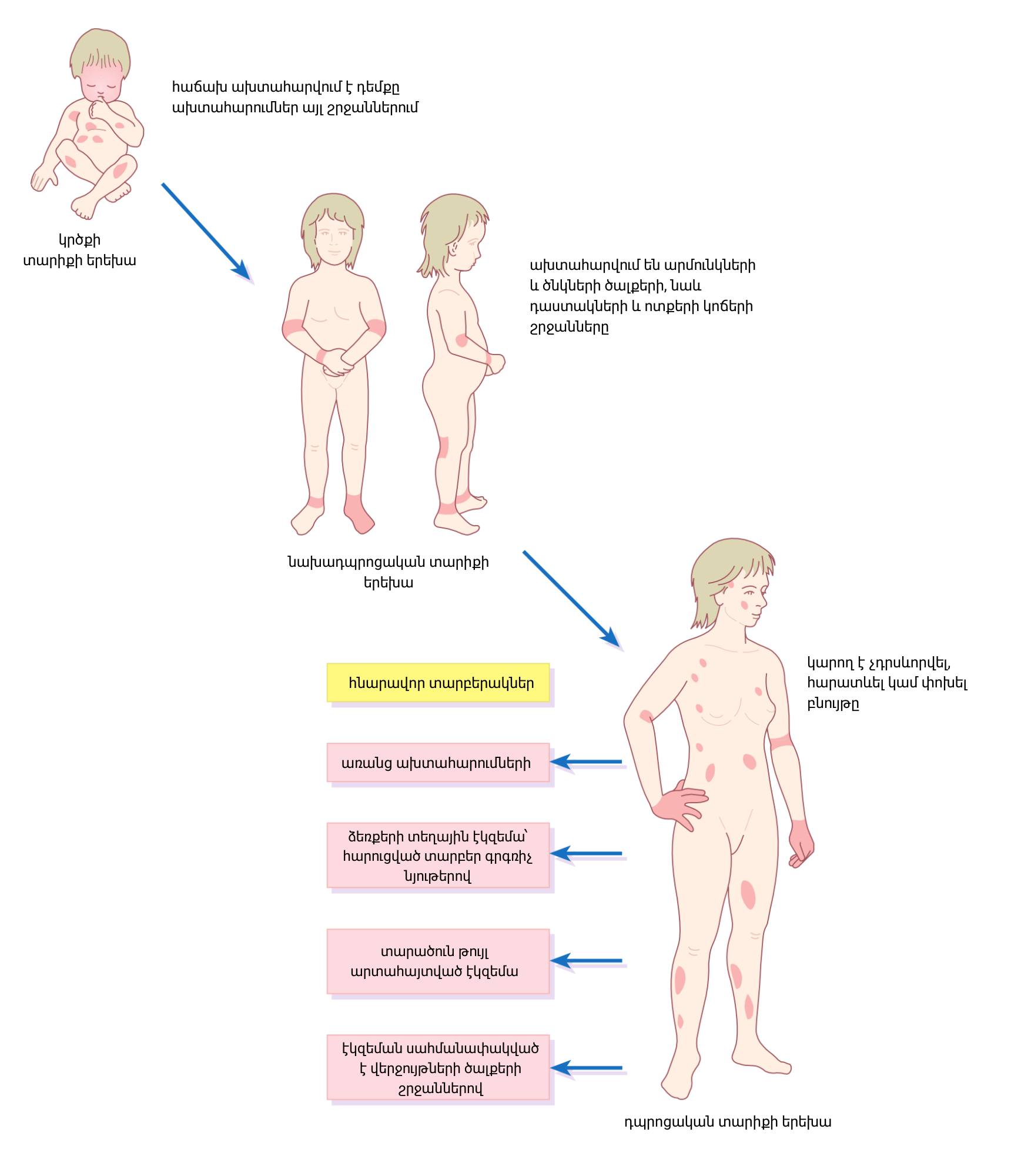
Diagram showing atopic eczema pattern in patients of different age.

=== Skin Problems: atopic eczema and diaper dermatitis ===
Atopic eczema is an inflammatory disorder that occurs in the outermost skin layer called the epidermis. This skin disorder affects 50% of infants in the first year after birth. Infants suffering from atopic eczema are characterized by intense itching, redness, and crusting in their skin. Skin thickening may result in chronic or sub-acute patients due to scratching and fissuring over time.

One of the commonly used medications for atopic eczema is non-prescription cream containing an anti-inflammatory agent 1% hydrocortisone. On the other hand, applying HBM on the skin as ointments is therapeutically beneficial to infants with mild to moderate atopic eczema. It is evidenced that, compared to 1% hydrocortisone, HBM has similar effectiveness as 1% hydrocortisone to relieve infants' inflaming skin conditions.

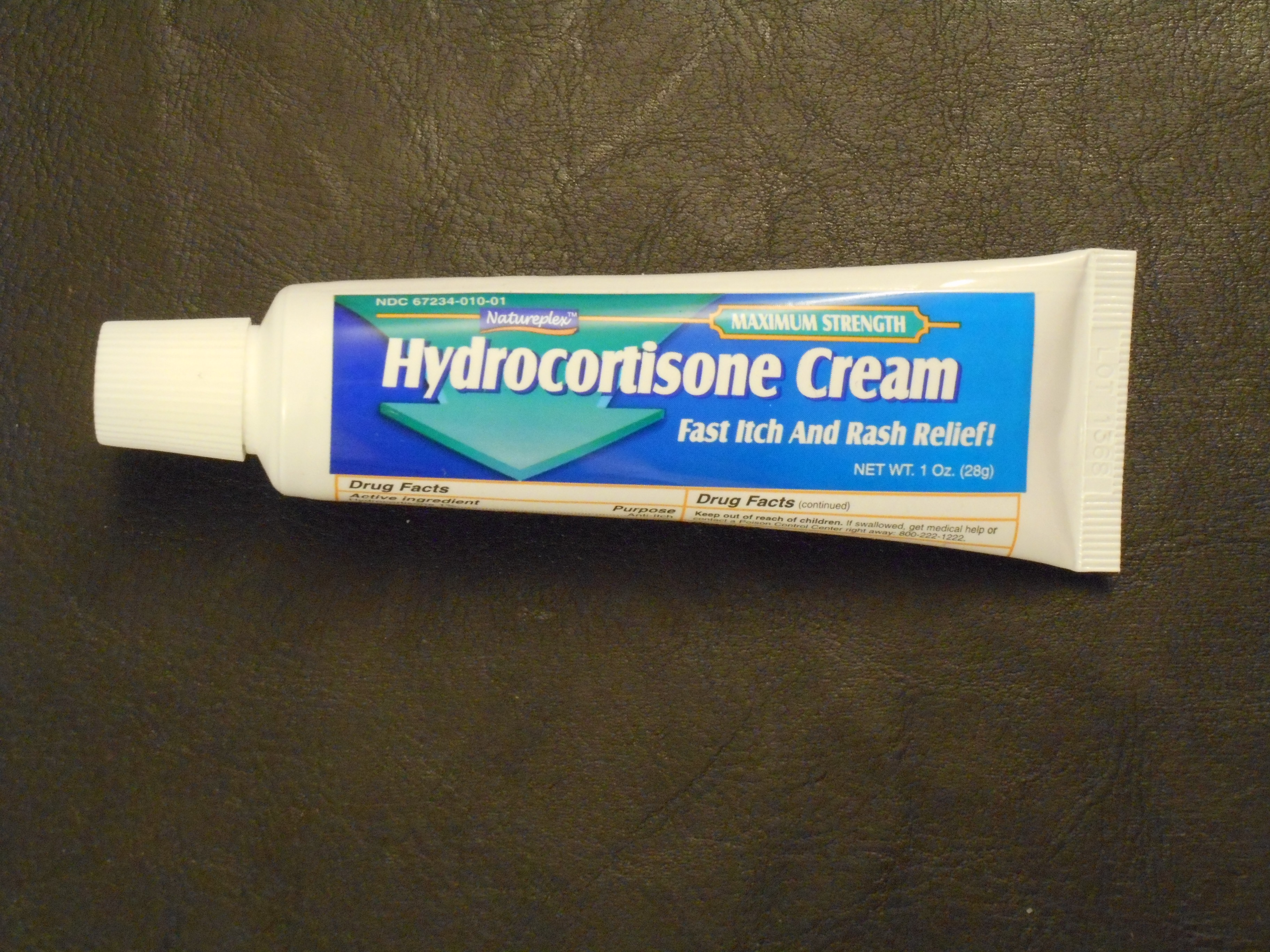
A tube of Hydrocortisone Cream.

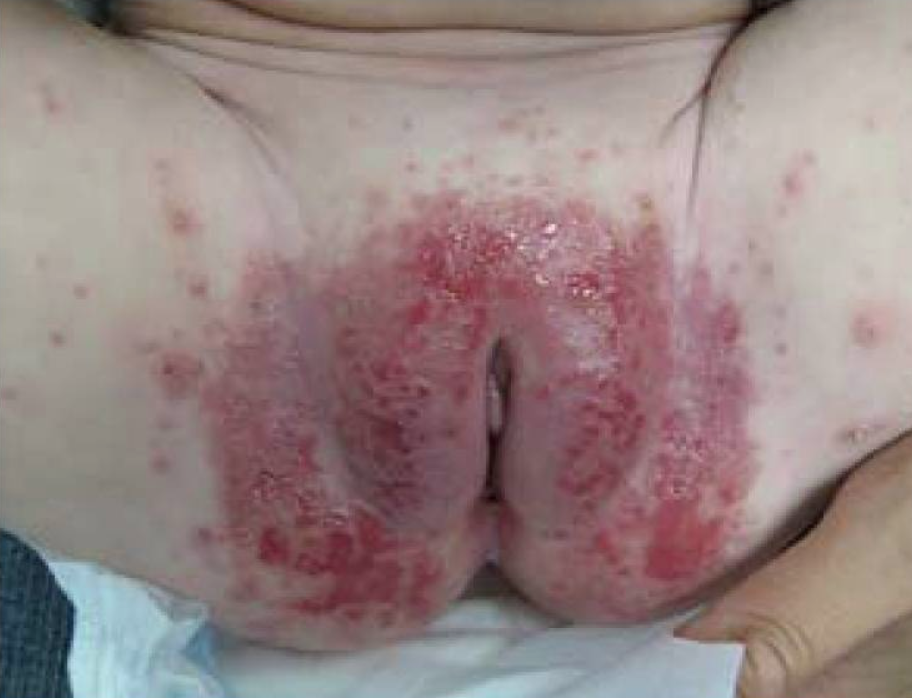
Inflammation of the skin in the diaper area.

Diaper dermatitis is another prevalent infant dermatological disorder. Common clinical features of diaper dermatitis include inflamed, itchy, tender skin and soreness in the diaper area. Study results have shown that human breastmilk is highly effective in healing diaper rash.

There is much evidence supporting the anti-inflammatory effect of HBM. The immunological components in HBM help strengthen the baby's immune system. These immunological components include antimicrobial proteins that can inhibit or kill a wide range of pathogens whose invasion may lead to an inflammatory response. This antimicrobial effect could be achieved by indirectly creating an unfavorable environment for the growth of pathogens by modifying commensal flora, pH, or level of bacterial substrates. The antimicrobial effect is also brought by an antibody immunoglobulin A (IgA) which is the prenominal immunoglobulin present in HBM that can protect infants from a variety of skin infections.

=== Nipple problems: sore nipples ===
The painful nipple is a common difficulty confronted by mothers who decided to carry out breastfeeding. Topical application of expressed breastmilk has long been a non-pharmacological intervention to reduce nipple pain. According to the research outcome of many studies, topical application of HBM can help reduce the perception of nipple pain in a treatment course of 4 to 5 days. It is also stated that HBM is more effective in lowering pain perception than Lanolin.

However, another study indicates that Lanolin produces lower pain levels in mothers with nipple pain than HBM. This study stated that lanolin shows a better therapeutic effect for healing rates, nipple trauma, and nipple pain. Although lanolin may be more efficacious than HBM to cure nipple problems, HBM is not proven to be ineffective to treat nipple pain. Considering HBM is more easily available than Lanolin, it is still useful for treating nipple problems in a practical sense.

=== Eye Problems ===
==== Traditional uses ====
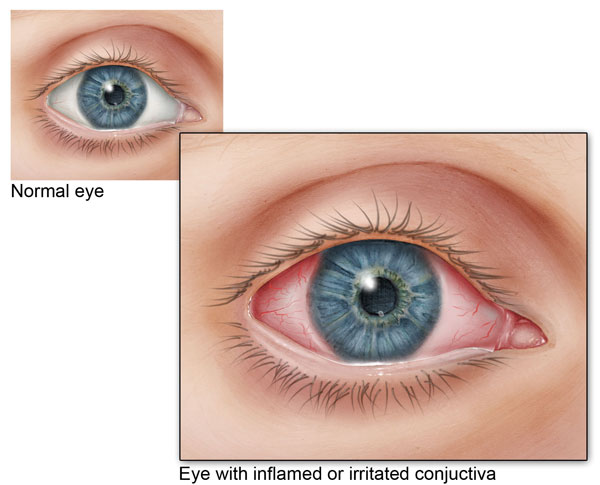
Diagram illustration of conjunctivitis

The topical application of breastmilk as a treatment for an infectious disease called conjunctivitis has been present since ancient times in different nations such as ancient Egypt, Rome, Greece, etc. HBM was also recommended by the Greek physician Galen as a remedy for conjunctivitis. Physicians in early modern England recommended human milk for conditions ranging from mild symptoms such as soreness to even blindness. Healers in that era even believed that a mixture of HBM with other components could restore eyesight.

==== Scientific findings ====
Evidence from clinical research has shown that applying HBM can prevent people from getting conjunctivitis infections.

Gonorrhea is a sexually transmitted infection. Besides sex-borne transmission, it can also be transmitted to babies during childbirth. This infectious disease can cause neonatal conjunctivitis, which could lead to blindness, if untreated. Hospitals in the United States are required to apply antibiotics to the eyes of new-born within one hour of childbirth to prevent the development of conjunctivitis. This is because certain bacteria in HBM are found to be effective against gonorrhea bacteria and may serve as a convenient and readily available substitute for antibiotics in places where antibiotics are not widely available.

== Breastmilk in umbilical cord care ==
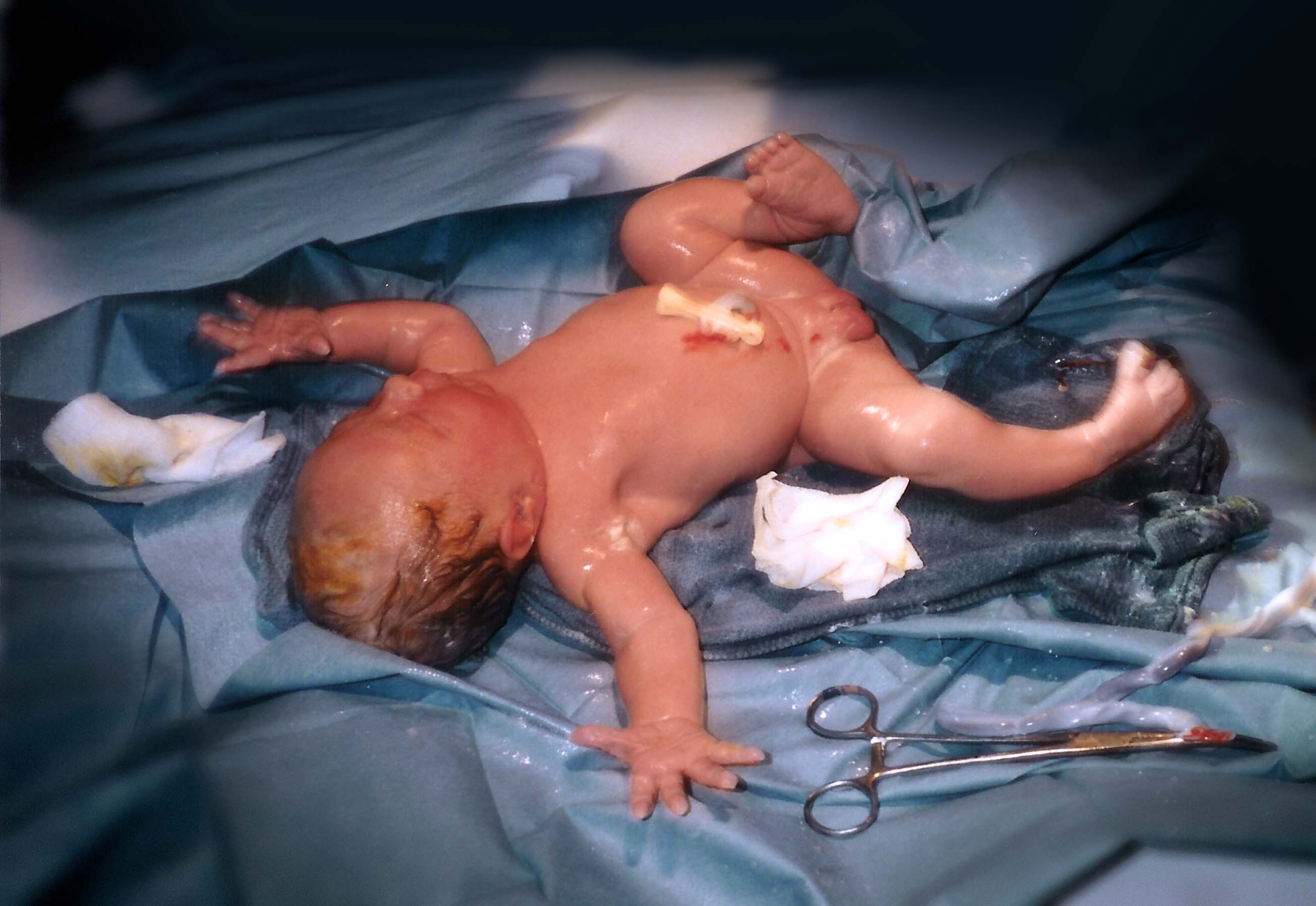
Umbilical cord attached to newborn

After labor in childbirth, the umbilical cord is clamped and cut, and part of it stays in contact with the infant. The remaining part of the umbilical cord dries out and eventually separates after 5–15 days. In taking care of the umbilical cord, the dry care method involving soap and water is recommended by the WHO and many national health organizations. For the use of HBM in umbilical cord care, clinical studies found that topical application of breast milk will lead to a shorter time of cord separation than other methods including ethanol and dry cord care.

== Anti tumoricidal and anti-bacterial effects ==
Human alpha-lactalbumin is a natural protein component of HBM. It can be extracted by chromatography from breast milk. It complexes with oleic acid to form a protein called the "human alpha-lactalbumin made lethal to tumor cells" (HAMLET). The HAMLET complex induces apoptosis in lung carcinoma cells. In in vitro and animal model studies, HAMLET has shown preventative and therapeutic effects in reducing and controlling tumor growth. The physiological effects of HAMLET may explain the proposal that breastfeeding has protective effects for mothers and children against cancer, as shown by the association length of breastfeeding and childhood cancer incidence. The HAMLET has also been found to have anti-bacterial effects through the inhibition of enzymes in glycolysis.

== Role in society ==
Researchers' interest in HBM is led by the discovery of a number of chemical components in HBM. These components include growth factors, cytokines, and a heterogeneous population of cells which are stem cells, probiotic bacteria, and the HAMLET complex.

By considering the easy accessibility of HBM and high prevalence of infant inflammation disorders, breastmilk may be a cheap and convenient ways to relieve inflammatory symptoms. The prophylactic antibiotic use of human milk may be important in areas where mothers and infants do not have easy access to medicine, such as people living in developing countries. Under these circumstances, practice of HBM therapy as medicine will be a determining factor in infant recovery and survival.

== General limitations ==
=== Breastfeeding difficulties ===
Breastfeeding may not be feasible or easy for some mothers due to psychological or physiological reasons. For instance, breastfeeding self-efficacy, the mother's confidence in her breastfeeding abilities, is positively associated with exclusive breastfeeding while postpartum depression makes it more difficult to breastfeed. Mothers who have undergone breast surgeries such as mastectomy may have reduced capabilities of HBM production.

=== Suitability of breastmilk ===
For some individuals, HBM may not be suitable for use, as it may transmit of viruses and other pathogens to infants. For instance, cytomegalovirus, HIV, and bacterial infections from the mother may be transmitted through HBM, causing complications for infants.

=== Evaluation of medical effectiveness of breastmilk ===
There is difficulty in the generalization of study results in evidence-based practice due to inconsistencies in the clinical study findings on breastfeeding medicine. HBM compositions are diverse among different individuals, or the same individual at various times. It is influenced by factors such as maternal diet and changes at various times after pregnancy. For instance, protein composition in HBM is higher in the earlier stages of lactation. Gradually, the mother produces more mature milk, which is whiter in color, compared to the yellowish colostrum. These changes may affect the effectiveness of HBM in medical use.
