= Pharmaceutical innovations =

Pharmaceutical innovations are currently guided by a patent system, the patent system protects the innovator of medicines for a period of time. The patent system does not currently stimulate innovation or pricing that provides access to medicine for those who need it the most, It provides for profitable innovation. As of 2014 about $140 Billion is spent on research and development of pharmaceuticals which produces 25–35 new drugs annually. Technology, which is transforming science, medicine, and research tools has increased the speed at which we can analyze data but we currently still must test the products which is a lengthy process. Differences in the performance of medical care may be due to variation in the introduction and circulation of pharmaceutical innovations.

The pharmaceutical industry does not apply the same definition of "innovative" as other industries because while a new product might offer a new mechanism of action, in and of itself that holds very little value. While a pharmaceutical company may view a product as innovative if it is patentable, in reality for a pharmaceutical product to be truly innovative it must address an unmet or inadequately met need and offer health outcomes that were not previously achievable.

A decline in research and development has been coined as Eroom's Law.

== Current model ==
The FDA has implemented the Breakthrough Therapy Designation which should help bring new needed products to the market faster. One of the key concerns in the current patent system is that an innovation patent is overly generous given that it has a very low inventiveness threshold.

The Medicines Patent Pool (MPP), is a United Nations-backed organisation founded in July 2010 and based in Geneva, Switzerland. The MPP aims to improve access to appropriate, affordable HIV medicines and technologies for people living with HIV in developing countries. Working in partnership with a range of stakeholders, the MPP opens the door to generic low-cost production of key HIV therapies as well as fixed-dose combinations and paediatric formulations by creating a pool of relevant patents for sub-licensing and product development.

=== Measurement ===
Kristopher J. Hult has proposed a new measurement based on novel and incremental innovation. The model predicts a decline of 40% for the 2010s.

One current way to measure is the Internal rate of return, which is used to measure and compare the profitability of investments. Reuters used the method to measure 2012 and found that the rate fell from 7.7% to 7.2%.

=== Barriers ===
Regulatory uncertainty is one area that stifles innovation. The approval processes are becoming increasingly complex.

== Proposed models ==
The Health Impact Fund (HIF) is a proposed pay-for-performance mechanism that would provide a market-based solution to problems concerning the development and distribution of medicines globally. It would incentivize the research and development of new pharmaceutical products that make substantial reductions in the global burden of disease. The HIF is the creation of a team of researchers led by the Yale philosopher Thomas Pogge and the University of Calgary economist Aidan Hollis, and is promoted by the non-profit organization Incentives for Global Health (IGH).

== Low investment into unpatentable options ==
An unintended but real consequence of the influence of a patent-heavy industry is that money is not put into unpatentable elements with the same fervor. A patent gives its owner the legal right to exclude others from making, using, or selling an invention for a a limited period of time. This can provide a competitive advantage for the patent holder. In health-care pharmaceuticals this advantage has proven to be highly profitable, driving over $83 billion dollars investment into Research and Development by the pharmaceutical industry in 2019. This focus on the profits of patentability leaves a downside where investment money is not going, that is, into unpatentable research.

The process of having something be deemed usable as a medical product involves going through a clinical trial. These can be quite expensive, sometimes costing into the billions of dollars. That elevated cost makes it a bad investment to pay for a medicine to be approved that does not guarantee years of profits to those that put up the money.

Biological patents are subject for debate and can vary from jurisdiction to jurisdiction. As of 2013 the US Supreme Court ruled that isolation by itself is not sufficient for something to be deemed inventive subject matter, and thus patentable. As a rule, raw natural material is generally rejected for patent approval by the United States Patent and Trademark Office, but genetically modified organisms have been patented several times.

The current patent structure lays incentives in a pattern that has been observed several times:

1) Some interesting characteristic is discovered through observation on something that is naturally occurring.
2) Experiments are made to verify the observed characteristic.
3) If the verified characteristic is deemed interesting, further experiments are made that attempt to isolate the compound that causes the interesting behavior.
4) Once isolated, the compound is again subject to experimentation to verify that it is, indeed, the one that causes the interesting behavior.
5) In order to be able to patent, efforts are then made to try and modify the original substance in a way that differentiates it.
6) Once the original substance has been successfully modified, a patent application is presented for the new substance.
7) If the patent is granted the new pharmaceutical candidate can then be taken to clinical trials.

An example of such an occurrence can be seen in the story of Human Breast Milk's cancer killing properties and HAMLET (Human Alpha-lactalbumin Made LEthal to Tumor cells), the modified and patented variation.

1) In 1995 Human Breast milk was observed that Human Breast Milk killed cancerous human cells while leaving healthy cells intact.
2) Experiments were made and the observed characteristic was verified.
3) Further experiments were made that isolated the compound multimeric alpha-lactalbumin (MAL) that caused the interesting behavior.
4) In 2000 an active compound for tumericidal activity was found to be a complex that involved oleic acid. as well as alpha-lactalbumin.
5) Alpha-lactalbumin was partially unfolded to allow for release of the calcium ion and replacement with an oleic acid molecule, this enabled cytotoxicity and stabilization of the molecule.
6) A patent for making HAMLET through combining alpha-lactalbumin with oleic acid was granted in 2008 (expired 2018). A patent for recombinant HAMLET was presented in 2010 (expires 2030). This can be viewed as HAMLET 2.0. Peptides for second generation use were patented in 2011. Use of HAMLET as prophylaxis (preventive was) patented in 2013 (expires 2033). The use of HAMLET for Papilloma was patented in 2013 (expires 2023).
7) HAMLET derived drug candidate, Alpha1H is in clinical trials for use with patients that have bladder cancer.

As much money as has been put into HAMLET... it is remarkable that no money has been put into the use of actual Human Breast Milk as a medical product that could fight cancer. Again, Human Breast milk is not patentable, thus investing into clinical trials for its use as a medical product means that profit cannot be had.

There are many naturally occurring plants and compounds that have medicinal properties. An example of a plant that holds multiple properties, but that has not had money put into clinical trials, is Aloe vera.

"Research on the use of aloe for specific conditions shows:

Burns and wounds. Application of aloe gel appears to shorten the duration of wound healing for first- and second-degree burns. Aloe gel might also promote wound healing.

Acne. Research suggests that aloe gel, applied in the morning and evening in addition to the use of the topical prescription acne medicine tretinoin (Retin-A, Atralin, others), might be more effective in reducing acne than using a topical prescription alone.

Psoriasis. Aloe extract cream might reduce redness, scaling, itching and inflammation caused by mild to moderate psoriasis. You might need to use the cream several times a day for a month or more to see improvements in your skin.

Herpes simplex virus. Applying a cream containing aloe extract might help lesions heal sooner.

Oral lichen planus. Research suggests that twice-daily application of aloe gel for eight weeks might help reduce symptoms of this inflammatory condition that affects the inside of the mouth.

Constipation. Whether oral use of aloe latex is effective at treating constipation is unclear. While it acts as a laxative, aloe latex can also cause abdominal cramps and diarrhea."

It is impossible to quantify something that does not happen. We can count how much money got put into research by companies that rely on patents and we can estimate how much a process for a clinical trial costs, but it is impossible to define how much money SHOULD have been spent just like it is impossible to estimate the effect of a process that has not been realized.

How much money could have been saved world-wide if doctors were allowed to prescribe medicine that many people can grow at home at a very low cost, like Aloe vera? How many people could have been spared death by skin cancer if human breast milk could be used topically to eliminate cancerous cells? We cannot know. We just know that research and clinical trial money was not put into unpatentable targets at the same rate and volume that it was for patentable ones.

== See also ==
- Pharmaceutical industry - The cost of innovation
- Chemical patent
- Generic drug
