= Cheesemaking =

Craft of making cheese

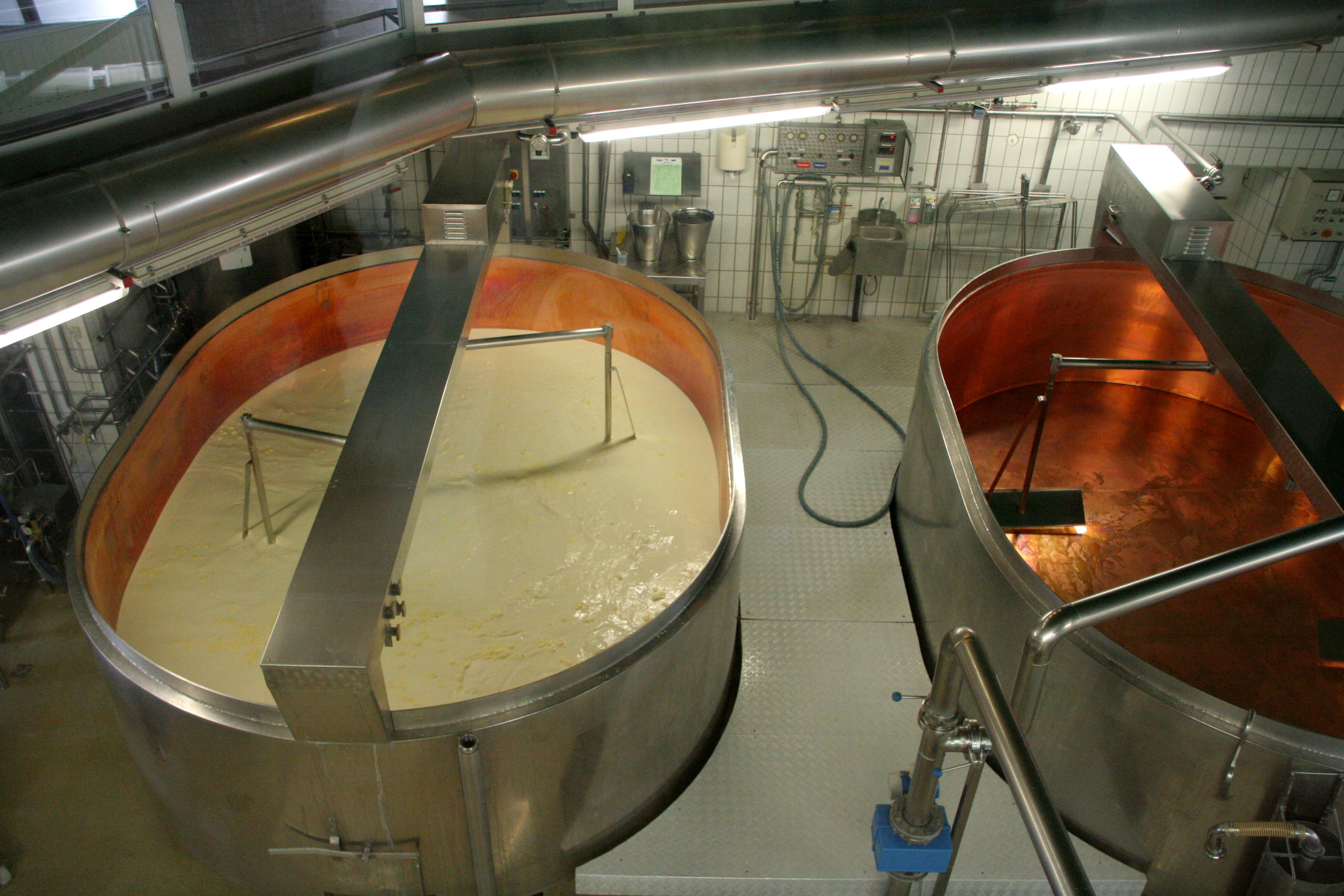
During industrial production of Emmental cheese, the as-yet-undrained curd is broken by rotating mixers.

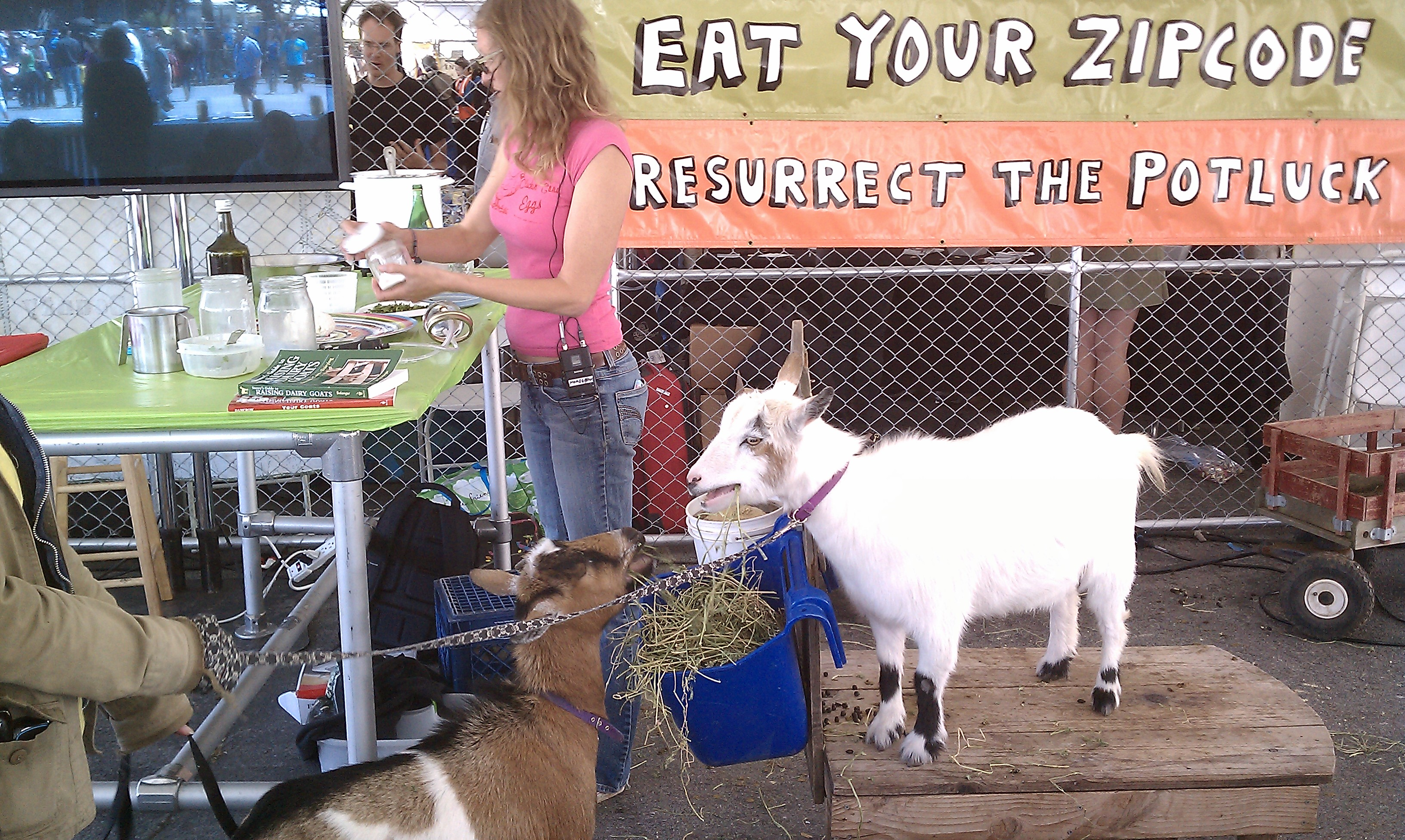
A cheesemaking workshop with goats at Maker Faire 2011. The sign declares, "Eat your Zipcode", in reference to the locavore movement.

Cheesemaking (or caseiculture) is the art of making cheese. The production of cheese, like many other food preservation processes, allows the nutritional and economic value of a food material, in this case milk, to be preserved in concentrated form. Cheesemaking allows the production of the cheese with diverse flavors and consistencies.

== History ==
Cheesemaking is documented in Egyptian tomb drawings and in ancient Greek literature.

Cheesemaking may have originated from nomadic herdsmen who stored milk in vessels made from sheep's and goats' stomachs. Because their stomach linings contain a mix of lactic acid, bacteria as milk contaminants and rennet, the milk would ferment and coagulate. A product reminiscent of yogurt would have been produced, which through gentle agitation and the separation of curds from whey would have resulted in the production of cheese; the cheese being essentially a concentration of the major milk protein, casein, and milk fat. The whey proteins, other major milk proteins, and lactose are all removed in the cheese whey. Another theory is offered by David Asher, who wrote that the origins actually lie within the "sloppy milk bucket in later European culture, it having gone unwashed and containing all of the necessary bacteria to facilitate the ecology of cheese".

=== Ancient cheesemaking ===
One of the ancient cheesemakers' earliest tools for cheesemaking, cheese molds or strainers, can be found throughout Europe and eastern Turkey dating back to the Bronze Age. Baskets were used to separate the cheese curds, but as technology advanced, these cheese molds would be made of wood or pottery. The cheesemakers placed the cheese curds inside of the mold, secured the mold with a lid, then added pressure to separate the whey, which would drain out from the holes in the mold. The more whey that was drained, the less moisture retained in the cheese. Less moisture meant that the cheese would be firmer. In Ireland, some cheeses ranged from a dry and hard cheese (mullahawn) to a semi-liquid cheese (millsén).

The designs and patterns were often used to decorate the cheeses and differentiate between them. Since many monastic establishments and abbeys owned their share of milk animals at the time, it was commonplace for the cheeses they produced to bear a cross in the middle.

Although the common perception of cheese today is made from cow's milk, goat's milk was actually the preferred base of ancient cheesemakers, because goats are smaller animals than cows. This meant that goats required less food and were easier to transport and herd. Moreover, goats can breed any time of the year as opposed to sheep, who also produce milk, but mating season only came around during fall and winter.

Before the age of pasteurization, cheesemakers knew that certain cheeses could cause constipation or kidney stones, so they advised their customers to supplement these side effects by eating in moderation along with other foods and consuming walnuts, almonds, or horseradish.

== Process ==
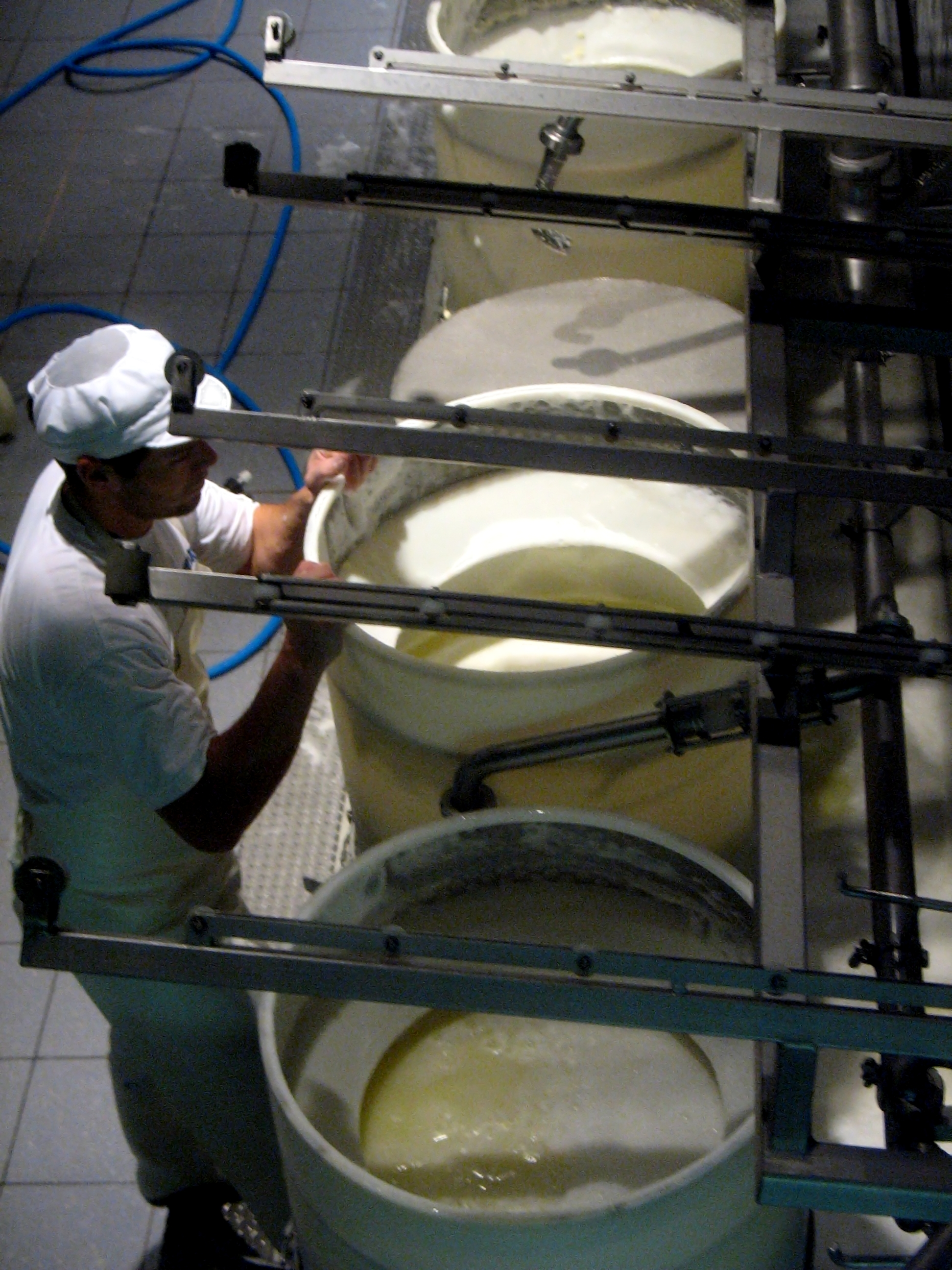
The production of Gruyère cheese at the cheesemaking factory of Gruyères, Canton of Fribourg, Switzerland

The goal of cheese making is to control the spoiling of milk into cheese. The milk is traditionally from a cow, goat, sheep, or buffalo, although, in theory, cheese could be made from the milk of any mammal. Cow's milk is most commonly used worldwide. The cheesemaker's goal is a consistent product with specific characteristics (appearance, aroma, taste, texture). The process used to make a Camembert will be similar to, but not quite the same as, that used to make Cheddar.

Some cheeses may be deliberately left to ferment from naturally airborne spores and bacteria; this approach generally leads to a less consistent product but one that is valuable in a niche market.

=== Culturing ===
Cheese is made by bringing milk (possibly pasteurised) in the cheese vat to a temperature required to promote the growth of the bacteria that feed on lactose and thus ferment the lactose into lactic acid. These bacteria in the milk may be wild, as is the case with unpasteurised milk, added from a culture, frozen or freeze dried concentrate of starter bacteria. Bacteria which produce only lactic acid during fermentation are homofermentative; those that also produce lactic acid and other compounds such as carbon dioxide, alcohol, aldehydes and ketones are heterofermentative. Fermentation using homofermentative bacteria is important in the production of cheeses such as Cheddar, where a clean, acid flavour is required. For cheeses such as Emmental, the use of heterofermentative bacteria is necessary to produce the compounds that give its characteristic fruity flavours and, importantly, the gas that results in the formation of bubbles in the cheese ('eye holes').

Starter cultures are chosen to give a cheese its specific characteristics. In the case of mould-ripened cheese such as Stilton, Roquefort or Camembert, mould spores (fungal spores) may be added to the milk in the cheese vat or can be added later to the cheese curd.

=== Coagulation ===
During the fermentation process, once sufficient lactic acid has been developed, rennet is added to cause the casein to precipitate. Rennet contains the enzyme chymosin which converts κ-casein to para-κ-caseinate (the main component of cheese curd, which is a salt of one fragment of the casein) and glycomacropeptide, which is lost in the cheese whey. As the curd is formed, milk fat is trapped in a casein matrix. After adding the rennet, the cheese milk is left to form curds over a period of time.

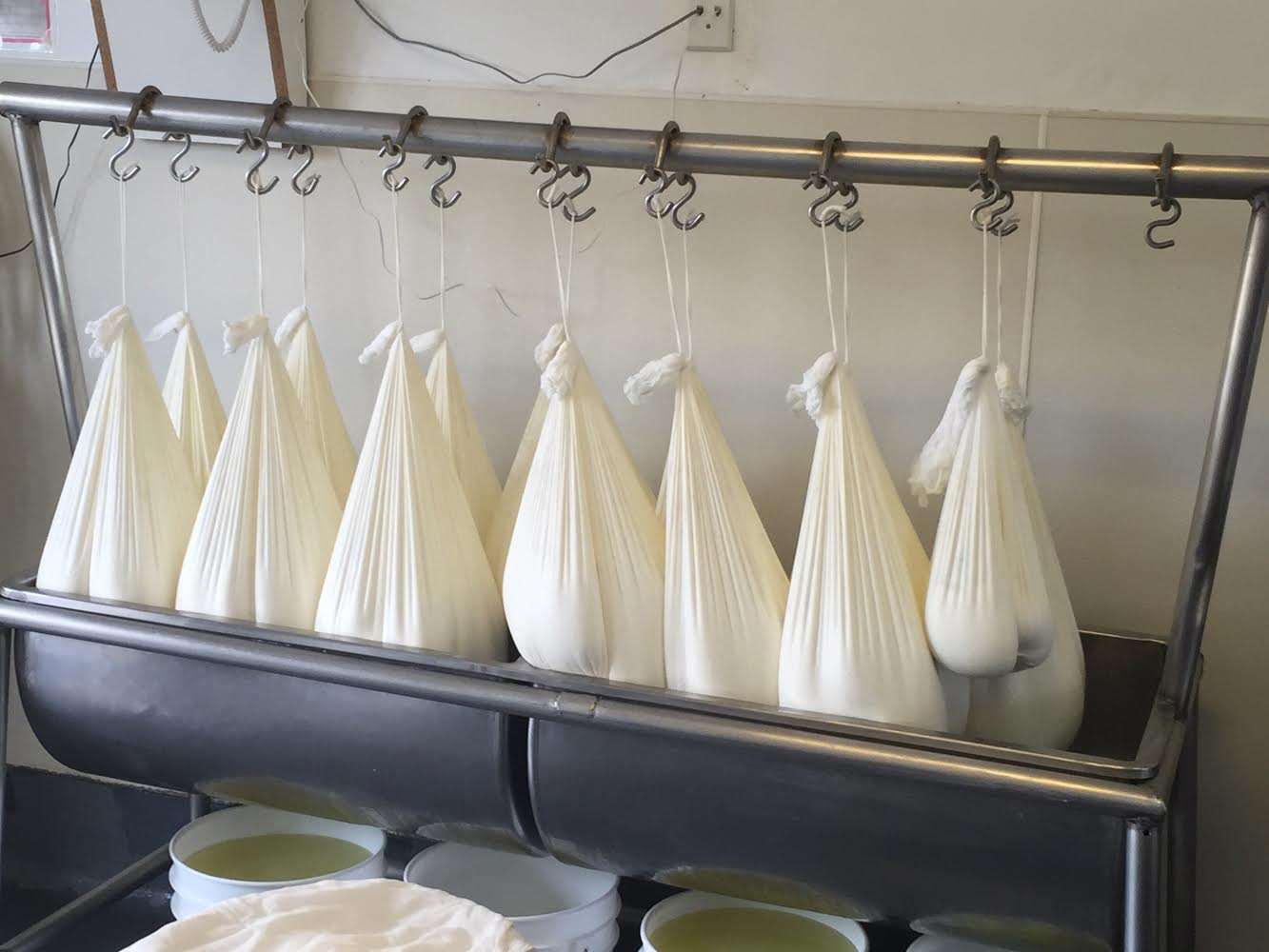
Fresh chevre hanging in cheesecloth to drain.

=== Draining ===
Once the cheese curd is judged to be ready, the cheese whey must be released. As with many foods the presence of water and the bacteria in it encourages decomposition. To prevent such decomposition it is necessary to remove most of the water (whey) from the cheese milk, and hence cheese curd, to make a partial dehydration of the curd. There are several ways to separate the curd from the whey.

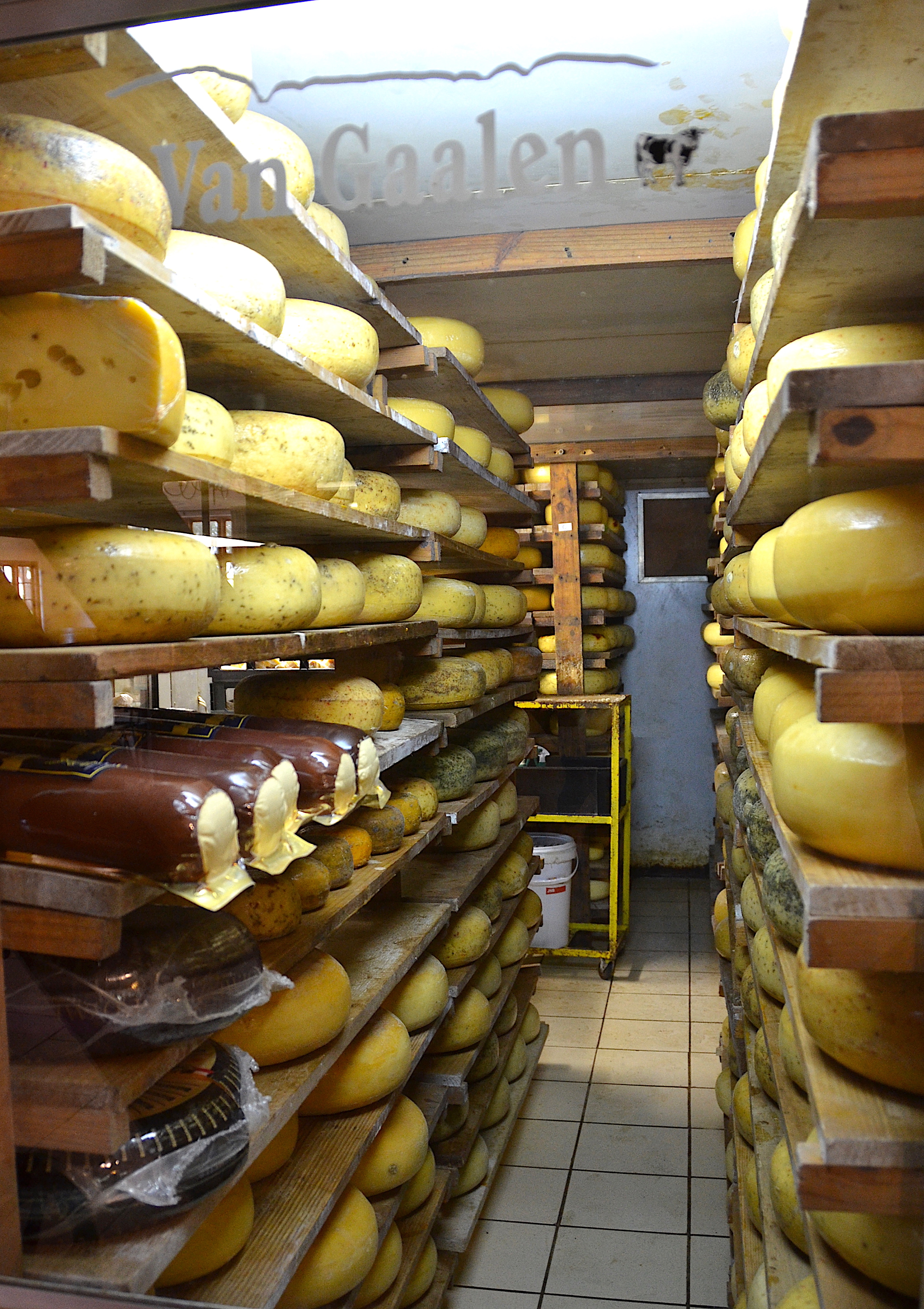
Maturing cheese in a cheese cellar

=== Scalding ===
In making Cheddar (or many other hard cheeses) the curd is cut into small cubes and the temperature is raised to approximately 39 °C (102 °F) to 'scald' the curd particles. Syneresis occurs and cheese whey is expressed from the particles. The Cheddar curds and whey are often transferred from the cheese vat to a cooling table which contains screens that allow the whey to drain, but which trap the curd. The curd is cut using long, blunt knives and 'blocked' (stacked, cut and turned) by the cheesemaker to promote the release of cheese whey in a process known as 'cheddaring'. During this process the acidity of the curd increases to a desired level. The curd is then milled into ribbon shaped pieces and salt is mixed into it to arrest acid development. The salted green cheese curd is put into cheese moulds lined with cheesecloths and pressed overnight to allow the curd particles to bind together. The pressed blocks of cheese are then removed from the cheese moulds and are either bound with muslin-like cloth, or waxed or vacuum packed in plastic bags to be stored for maturation. Vacuum packing removes oxygen and prevents mould (fungal) growth during maturation, which, depending on the wanted final product, may or may not be a desirable characteristic.

=== Mould-ripening ===
In contrast to cheddaring, making cheeses like Camembert requires a gentler treatment of the curd. It is carefully transferred to cheese hoops and the whey is allowed to drain from the curd by gravity, generally overnight. The cheese curds are then removed from the hoops to be brined by immersion in a saturated salt solution. The salt absorption stops bacteria growing, as with Cheddar. If white mould spores have not been added to the cheese milk it is applied to the cheese either by spraying the cheese with a suspension of mould spores in water or by immersing the cheese in a bath containing spores of, e.g., Penicillium candida.

By taking the cheese through a series of maturation stages where temperature and relative humidity are carefully controlled, allowing the surface mould to grow and the mould-ripening of the cheese by fungi to occur. Mould-ripened cheeses ripen very quickly compared to hard cheeses (weeks against months or years). This is because the fungi used are biochemically very active when compared with starter bacteria. Some cheeses are surface-ripened by moulds, such as Camembert and Brie, some are ripened internally, such as Stilton, which is pierced with stainless steel wires, to admit air to promote mould spore germination and growth, as with Penicillium roqueforti. Surface ripening of some cheeses, such as Saint-Nectaire, may also be influenced by yeasts which contribute flavour and coat texture. Others are allowed to develop bacterial surface growths which give characteristic colours and appearances, e.g., by the growth of Brevibacterium linens which gives an orange coat to cheeses.

== In popular culture ==
Cheesemaking has served as the theme of several fictional works and games. This includes Fromage, a 2024 strategy board game.

== See also ==
- List of cheesemakers

== Bibliography ==
- Winstein, Merryl (2017). Successful Cheesemaking™, Step-by-Step Directions and Photos for Making Nearly Every Type of Cheese, (670pp, 800 photos). St. Louis, Missouri: Smooth Stone Press. ISBN 978-0998595955.
- Robinson, R.K.; Wilbey, R.A. (1998). Cheesemaking practice (3rd ed.). Dordrecht: Kluwer Academic.
- Banks, J (1998). Cheese (2nd ed.).
- Early, R. The technology of dairy products. London: Chapman and Hall.
- Jenkins, Steven (1996). Cheese Primer. New York: Workman Publishing.
- Tannahill, Reay (2008). Food in History. New York: Three Rivers Press.
