= Albumin =

Family of globular proteins

Serum albumin family
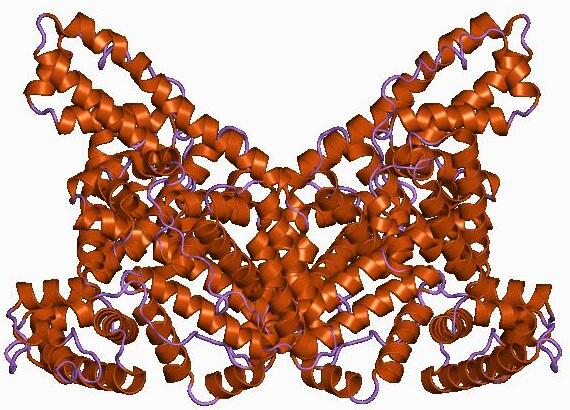
- Structure of serum albumin.

Identifiers
- Symbol: Serum_albumin
- Pfam: PF00273
- Pfam clan: CL0282
- InterPro: IPR014760
- SMART: SM00103
- PROSITE: PS51438
- SCOP2: 1ao6 / SCOPe / SUPFAM
Available protein structures:
- PDB: 1ao6, 1bj5, 1bke, 1bm0, 1e78, 1e7a, 1e7b, 1e7c, 1e7e, 1e7f, 1e7g, 1e7h, 1e7i, 1gni, 1gnj, 1h9z, 1ha2, 1hk1, 1hk2, 1hk3, 1hk4, 1hk5, 1j78, 1j7e, 1kw2, 1kxp, 1lot, 1ma9, 1n5u, 1o9x, 1tf0, 1uor, 1ysx, 2bx8, 2bxa, 2bxb, 2bxc, 2bxd, 2bxe, 2bxf, 2bxg, 2bxh, 2bxi, 2bxk, 2bxl, 2bxm, 2bxn, 2bxo, 2bxp, 2bxq, 2i2z, 2i30, 2vdb, 2vue, 2vuf, 3b9l, 3b9m IPR014760 PF00273 (ECOD; PDBsum)
- AlphaFold: IPR014760; PF00273

Albumin is a family of globular proteins, the most common of which are the serum albumins. All of the proteins of the albumin family are water-soluble, moderately soluble in concentrated salt solutions, and experience heat denaturation. Albumins are commonly found in blood plasma and differ from other blood proteins in that they are not glycosylated. Substances containing albumins are called albuminoids.

A number of blood transport proteins are evolutionarily related in the albumin family, including serum albumin, alpha-fetoprotein, vitamin D-binding protein and afamin. This family is only found in vertebrates.

Albumins in a less strict sense can mean other proteins that coagulate under certain conditions. See § Other albumin types for lactalbumin, ovalbumin and plant "2S albumin".

== Function ==
Albumins in general are transport proteins that bind to various ligands and carry them around. Human types include:

- Human serum albumin is the main protein of human blood plasma. It makes up around 50% of human plasma proteins. It binds water, cations (such as Ca^{2+}, Na^{+} and K^{+}), fatty acids, hormones, bilirubin, thyroxine (T4) and pharmaceuticals (including barbiturates). Its main function is to regulate the oncotic pressure of blood. The isoelectric point of albumin is 4.7.
- Alpha-fetoprotein is a fetal plasma protein that binds various cations, fatty acids and bilirubin.
- Vitamin D-binding protein binds to vitamin D and its metabolites, as well as to fatty acids.
- Afamin binds vitamin E. It seems to carry lipidated Wnt proteins and Vitamin E around.
- Extracellular matrix protein 1 is a less canonical albumin. It regulates bone mineralization.

The four canonical human albumins are arranged on chromosome 4 region 4q13.3 in a tandem manner.

== Classification ==
Albumins found in animals can be divided into six subfamilies by phylogeny. The Vitamin-D binding proteins occupy families 1–3. The other albumins are mixed among each other in families 4–6. ECM1 is in family 6.

In addition to their medical use, serum albumins are valued in biotechnology. Bovine serum albumin is usually used, although versions from humans and genetically modified rice are also used to reduce animal cruelty.

=== Other albumin types ===
A few other proteins are also sometimes called albumins. They are not in the same family as vertebrate albumins:

- Ovalbumin is a storage protein in egg white (albumen). It is a serpin.
- Lactalbumin, or whey protein, is a protein fraction of milk. It is mainly Beta-lactoglobulin, although serum albumin also comprises a small part of it.
- Some plant seeds, including hemp, encode "2S albumins". These are named for their egg-like coagulation property.

== Structure ==
The 3D structure of human serum albumin has been determined by X-ray crystallography to a resolution of 2.5 ångströms (250 pm). Albumin is a 65–70kDa protein.

Albumin comprises three homologous domains that assemble to form a heart-shaped protein. Each domain is a product of two subdomains that possess common structural motifs. The principal regions of ligand binding to human serum albumin are located in hydrophobic cavities in subdomains IIA and IIIA, which exhibit similar chemistry. Structurally, the serum albumins are similar, each domain containing five or six internal disulfide bonds.

== Forensic detection ==
Worldwide, certain traditional Chinese medicines contain wild bear bile, banned under CITES legislation. Dip sticks, similar to common pregnancy tests, have been developed to detect the presence of bear albumin in traditional medicine products, indicating that bear bile had been used in their creation.

== Etymology ==
Albumin is pronounced /ˈælbjʊmɪn/; formed from Latin: albumen "egg white", itself derived from the Latin albus: white.

== See also ==
- Cohn process (human serum albumin purification method)
- Serum albumin
  - Bovine serum albumin
  - Human serum albumin
