= Fromage =

Fromage is the French word for cheese. The term may also refer to:

- Fromage (board game), a 2024 strategy board game
- Fromage (Hannibal), episode of TV series Hannibal
- Fromage (special), annual Canadian one-hour special
