= Glycomacropeptide =

Glycosolated polypeptide in dairy

Glycomacropeptide (GMP) is a glycosylated peptide formed during renneting as a fragment of sweet whey. Acid whey from yogurt or curdling cheese without the use of rennet does not contain GMP. The unglycosylated form is known as caseinomacropeptide or CMP. Both forms exist in roughly similar amounts in whey.

Together GMP and CMP make up 20-25% of whey protein. This makes them the third largest fraction of whey protein isolate, after alpha-lactalbumin and beta-lactoglobulin. GMP is formed when the casein micelle that encapsulates milk protein is cleaved by the enzyme chymosin. The 64 terminal peptides of Kappa-casein are removed by the enzyme to create GMP. The remaining peptides form para-kappa-casein. Vegetable rennets cleave at the same location and thus also produce GMP.

== Properties ==
GMP is unique from other milk peptides in several ways. Kappa-casein is the only glycosylated casein protein and GMP, which makes up much of Kappa-casein, is also glycosylated. The glycans make GMP the only portion of the casein micelle that is water soluble after curdling has occurred, and thus, the only fraction of casein protein to dissolve into the whey.

Additionally, GMP is the only easily attainable source of dietary peptides that does not contain any aromatic amino acids. This makes it a safe source for individuals with phenylketonuria to obtain dietary amino acids, as phenylalanine is an aromatic amino acid.
