= Whey =

Liquid remaining after milk has been curdled and strained

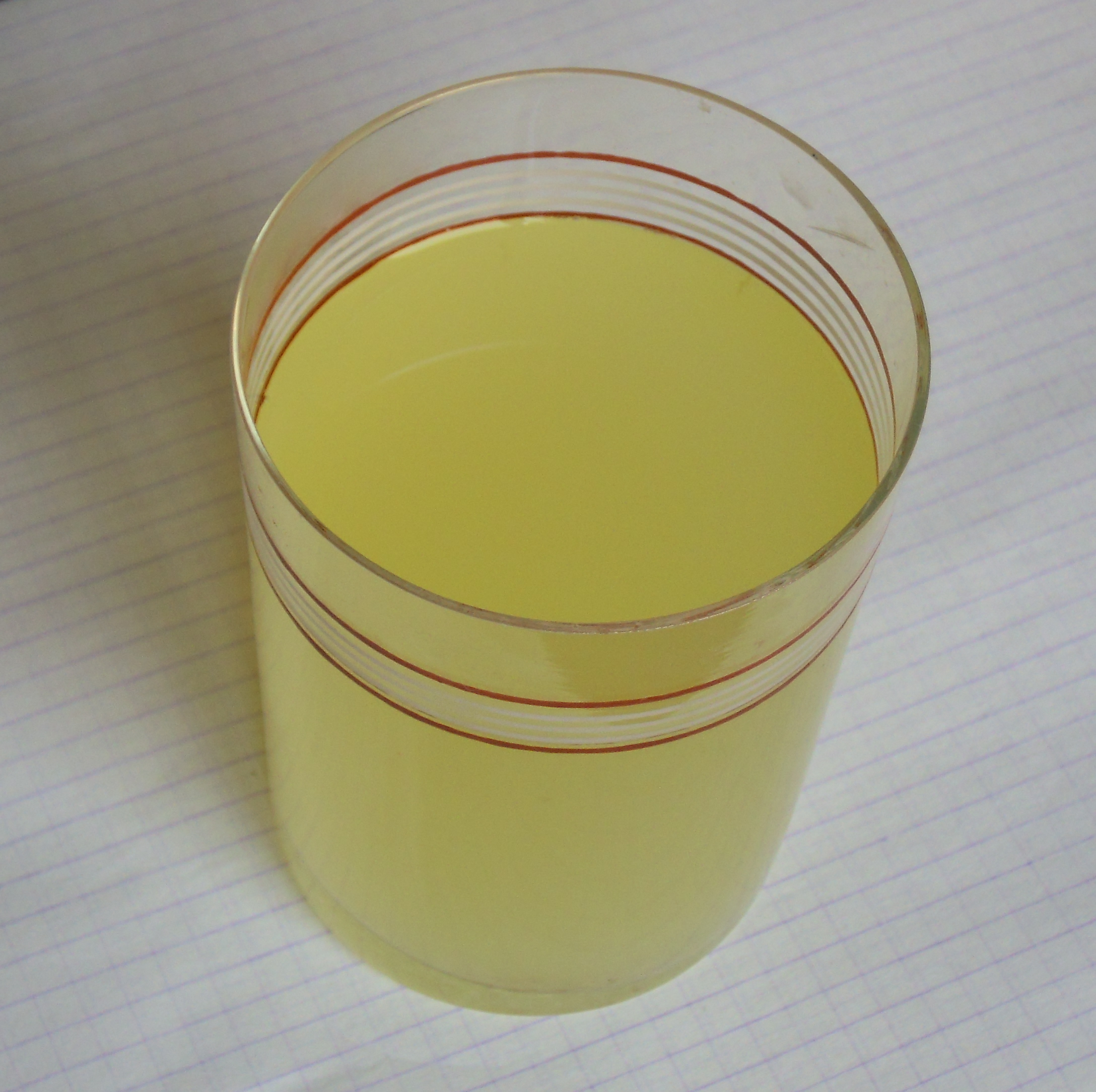
A glass of soured milk whey

Whey is the liquid remaining after milk has been curdled and strained. It is a byproduct of the manufacturing of cheese or casein and has several commercial uses. Sweet whey is a byproduct of the making of rennet types of hard cheese, like cheddar or Swiss cheese. Acid whey (also known as sour whey) is a byproduct of the making of acidic dairy products such as strained yogurt.

Whey proteins consist of β-lactoglobulin (48%–58%), α-lactalbumin (13%–19%), Glycomacropeptide (12%–20%), bovine serum albumin, heavy and light chain immunoglobulins and several minor whey proteins.

== Composition ==
Sweet whey and acid whey are similar in gross nutritional analysis. By mass both contain 93% water, about 0.8% protein, and about 5.1% carbohydrates. Sweet whey contains about 0.4% fat while sour whey contains about 0.1% fat. The carbohydrates are mainly lactose. The proteins are known as lactalbumin. Whey also contains some minerals.

== Production ==
To produce cheese, rennet or an edible acid is added to heated milk. This makes the milk coagulate or curdle (heat-acid coagulation), separating the milk solids (curds) from the liquid whey. Sweet whey is the byproduct of rennet-coagulated cheese, and acid whey (also called sour whey) is the byproduct of acid-coagulated cheese. Sweet whey has a pH greater than or equal to 5.6; acid whey has a pH less than or equal to 5.1.

Whey can also be made by adding an acid such as cream of tartar to milk and warming it, letting the curds settle to the bottom.

Production of whey

Per capita production of whey

=== Further processing ===
The fat from whey is removed and then processed for human foods (see whey butter). Processing can be done by simple drying, or the relative protein content can be increased by removing lipids and other non-protein materials. For example, spray drying after membrane filtration separates the proteins from whey.

Heat denatures whey proteins, causing them to coagulate into a protein gel that may be useful in some foods. Sustained high temperatures above 72 °C can denature whey proteins. Heat-denatured whey can still cause allergies in some people.

== Uses ==
Whey is used to produce whey cheeses such as ricotta, Norwegian brunost, and whey butter and many other products for human consumption. The fat content of whey is low; 1,000 pounds of whey are required to make a few pounds of whey butter. It is also an additive in many processed foods, including breads, crackers, and commercial pastry, and in animal feed. Whey proteins consist primarily of α-lactalbumin and β-lactoglobulin. Sweet whey contains glycomacropeptide (GMP). It is also an abundant source of lactose which can further be used for the synthesis of lactose-based bioactive molecules.

Dairy whey remaining from home-made cheesemaking has many uses. It is a dough conditioner and can be substituted for skimmed milk in most baked good recipes that require milk (bread, pancakes, muffins, etc.).

Throughout history, whey was a popular drink in inns and coffee houses. When Joseph Priestley was at college at Daventry Academy, 1752–1755, he records that, on the morning of Wednesday, 22 May 1754, he "went with a large company to drink whey." This was probably "sack whey" or "wine whey".

Whey is also one of the main ingredients of Rivella, a carbonated drink in Switzerland.

In areas where cheese is made, excess whey byproduct is sometimes sprayed over hay fields as a fertilizer.

Whey as a byproduct of cheese making was historically considered a waste product and was pumped into rivers and streams in the U.S. Since the whey contained protein, this practice led to the growth of large concentrations of algae. These were deemed to be a hazard to the ecosystem because they prevented sunlight and oxygen from penetrating into the water. The government eventually prohibited this practice, which led to a disposal problem for producers of other dairy products. Their first solution was to use it as a cheap filler in the production of ice cream. Whey eventually found its way into innumerable other products as a filler and ultimately into a number of health food products where it remains a popular supplement.

=== Whey protein ===
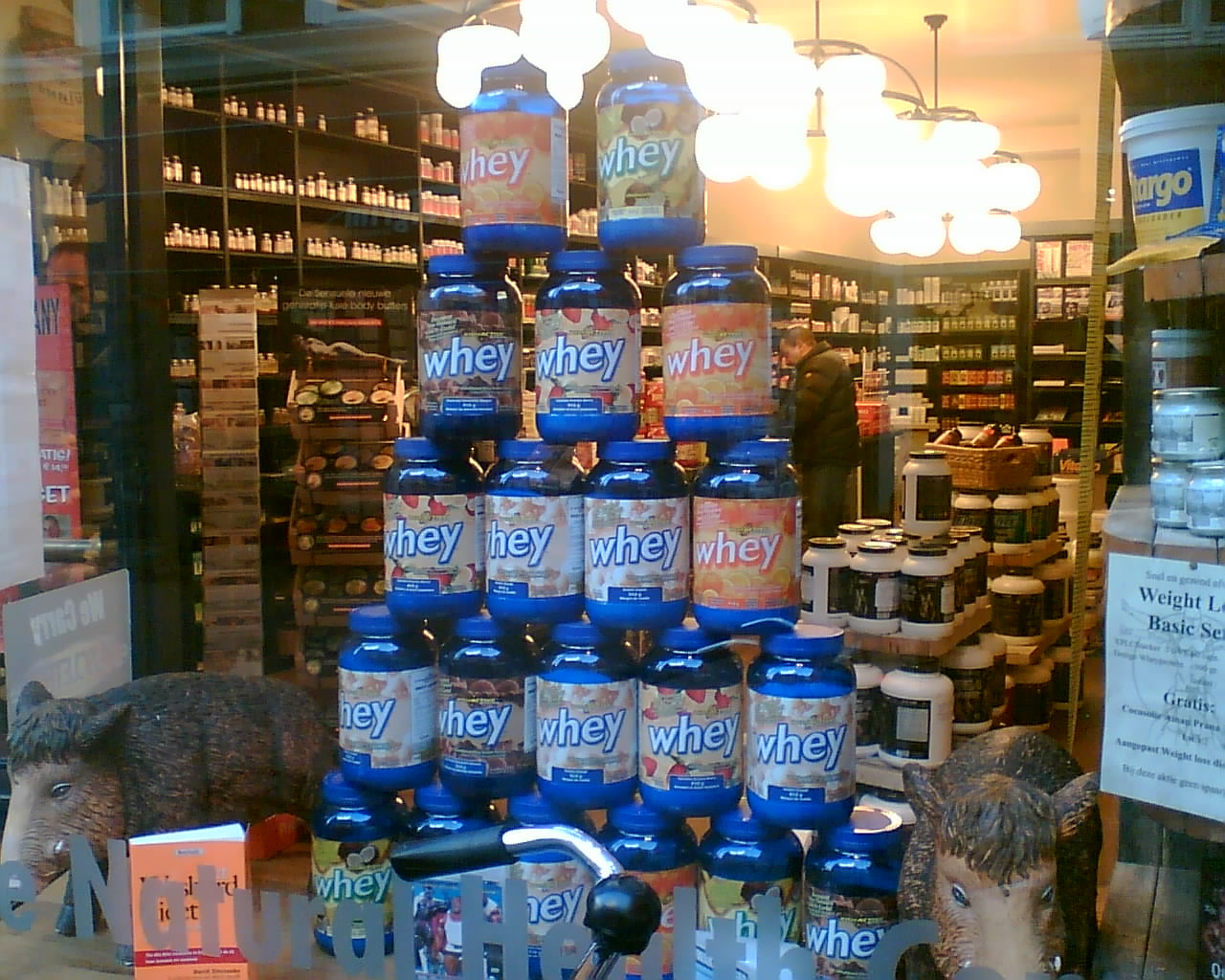
Containers of whey protein being sold at a health food store

Whey protein is commonly marketed as a dietary supplement, and various health claims have been attributed to it in the alternative medicine community. Although whey proteins are responsible for some milk allergies, the major allergens in milk are the caseins.

Whey is the primary ingredient in most protein powders, which are used primarily by athletes and bodybuilders to obtain the necessary amounts of protein for muscle building/maintenance on a daily basis. Whey protein has a high level of leucine, one of the three branched-chain amino acids, making it ideal for muscle growth and repair. Whey is pasteurized to assure that no harmful bacteria are breeding in the liquid. It is heated to 70–80 °C (158–176 °F) and is then cooled back down to 4 °C (39 °F). Studies have shown that this process of using extreme temperatures eliminates 99.7% of bacteria without coagulating the protein into a solid mass. Next, the whey must be filtered, and so is loaded into a massive web of ceramic filters and stainless steel turbines. These machines work to separate out the lactose as well as the fats, leaving a liquid of 90% whey protein.

Hydrolysates are whey proteins that are predigested and partially hydrolyzed for the purpose of easier metabolizing, but their cost is generally higher. Highly hydrolysed whey may be less allergenic than other forms of whey, due to the fact that the short chain peptides obtained by hydrolysis are less antigenic, because of the elimination of sequential epitopes.

Native whey protein is extracted from skim milk, not obtained as a byproduct of cheese production, and is produced as a concentrate and isolate.

=== Whey cream and butter ===
Cream can be skimmed from whey. Whey cream is saltier, tangier, and "cheesier" than ("sweet") cream skimmed from milk, and can be used to make whey butter. Due to the low fat content of whey, the yield is low, with typically two to five parts of butter manufactured from the whey of 1,000 parts milk. Whey cream and butter are suitable for making butter-flavoured food, as they have a stronger flavour of their own. They are also cheaper to manufacture than sweet cream and butter.

== Health ==
Liquid whey contains lactose, vitamins, protein, and minerals, along with traces of fat.

In 2005 researchers at Lund University in Sweden found that whey can help regulate and reduce spikes in blood sugar levels in people with type 2 diabetes by increasing insulin secretion.

Dairy products produce higher insulin responses (Insulin index, II, 90–98) than expected from their comparatively low glycemic indices (GI 15–30). Insulinogenic effects from dairy products have been observed in healthy subjects, both when ingested as a single meal, and when included into a mixed meal. The insulin-releasing capacity of dairy products has been attributed to the protein fraction, particularly the whey fraction, and the subsequent release of amino acids during digestion has been proposed to underlie the insulinogenic properties of milk.

As whey contains lactose, it should be avoided by lactose intolerant individuals. When used as a food additive, whey can contribute to quantities of lactose far above the level of tolerance of most lactose-intolerant individuals. Additionally, people can be allergic to whey or other milk proteins, but as whey proteins are altered by high temperatures, whey-sensitive individuals may be able to tolerate evaporated, boiled, or sterilized milk. Hard cheeses are high in casein, but low in whey proteins, and are the least allergenic for those allergic to whey proteins. However, casein proteins (which are heat-stable) are the most important allergens in cheese, and an individual may be allergic to either or both types of protein.

=== Unsupported health claims ===
In 2010 a panel of the European Food Safety Authority examined health claims made for whey protein. For the following claims either no references were provided for the claimed effect or the provided studies did not test the claims, or reported conflicting results:

- Increase in satiety leading to a reduction in energy intake
- Contribution to the maintenance or achievement of a normal body weight
- Growth or maintenance of muscle mass (compared to other protein sources)
- Increase in lean body mass during energy restriction and resistance training (compared to other protein sources)
- Reduction of body fat mass during energy restriction and resistance training (compared to other protein sources)
- Increase in muscle strength (compared to other protein sources)
- Increase in endurance capacity during the subsequent exercise bout after strenuous exercise
- Skeletal muscle tissue repair (compared to other protein sources)
- Faster recovery from muscle fatigue after exercise (compared to other protein sources).

For the studies around muscle mass and strength whey protein was compared to other protein sources. This is important to note, since protein is necessary for building muscles and this study proved that whey protein is not better for building strength and size than other protein sources.

On the basis of the data presented, the 2010 panel concluded that a cause and effect relationship between the consumption of whey protein and these claims had not been established.

== Environmental impact and waste management ==
The global cheese industry generates approximately 160 million cubic meters of whey annually. While a significant portion is processed into value-added products, roughly 42% of this volume remains unutilized, often being used as low-value animal feed, fertilizer, or discharged directly into water bodies. Due to its high organic load (50–80 g COD/L) and nutrient content (nitrogen and phosphorus), improper disposal of whey poses a significant risk of eutrophication in aquatic ecosystems.

=== Anaerobic treatment and co-digestion ===
Anaerobic digestion is a widely used method for treating cheese whey due to its high biodegradability (approximately 99%). Mechanically stirred anaerobic sequencing batch reactors (ASBR) have shown removal efficiencies above 90% for organic matter. However, the process requires careful control of alkalinity (often supplemented with sodium bicarbonate) to maintain stability and prevent the flotation of granular biomass caused by the formation of viscous polymers at high organic loads.

To enhance energy recovery, co-digestion strategies have been developed to overcome the limitations of mono-digestion. Research by Lovato et al. (2018) demonstrated that co-digesting cheese whey with glycerin—a major by-product of the biodiesel industry—can significantly improve biohydrogen production. Their study indicated that mesophilic conditions (30 °C) are optimal for hydrogen production in these co-digestion systems, provided that inoculum pre-treatment and micronutrient supplementation are applied.

Further advancements have focused on two-stage anaerobic digestion systems, which separate the acidogenic (hydrogen-producing) and methanogenic (methane-producing) phases. A comparative study by Lovato et al. (2020) confirmed that a two-stage system treating a mixture of whey and glycerin is more energetically feasible than a traditional single-stage methanogenic system, offering higher net energy yields. Additionally, operating these two-stage systems under thermophilic conditions (55 °C) has been validated as a robust strategy for full-scale applications, allowing for higher organic loading rates and optimized energy recovery compared to single-stage configurations.

=== Valorization and circular economy ===
Recent trends in the dairy industry focus on a circular economy approach, transforming whey treatment plants into biorefineries. Instead of producing only biogas, processes can be tuned for acidogenic fermentation to produce volatile fatty acids (VFAs) via the carboxylate platform. Recent findings suggest that applying thermal and alkaline pre-treatments to the inoculum can effectively halt methanogenesis, thereby favoring the accumulation of VFAs, which serve as valuable precursors for bioplastics and other chemicals.

Integrated systems coupling anaerobic digestion with microalgae cultivation have also been proposed. In these "closed-loop" scenarios, the nutrient-rich digestate serves as a substrate for microalgal biomass production, which can be harvested for biofuels or high-value pigments, while simultaneously recovering nitrogen and phosphorus (e.g., as struvite).

== See also ==
- Buttermilk
- List of dairy products
