= K-casein =

Mammalian milk protein

CSN3

Identifiers
- Aliases: CSN3, CSN10, CSNK, KCA, CNS10, casein kappa
- External IDs: OMIM: 601695; MGI: 107461; GeneCards: CSN3

Gene location (Human)
Chr.	Chromosome 4 (human)
Band	4q13.3	Start	70,238,382 bp
Band	4q13.3	End	70,251,474 bp

Gene location (Mouse)
Chr.	Chromosome 5 (mouse)
Band	5 E1|5 43.56 cM	Start	88,073,438 bp
Band	5 E1|5 43.56 cM	End	88,080,524 bp
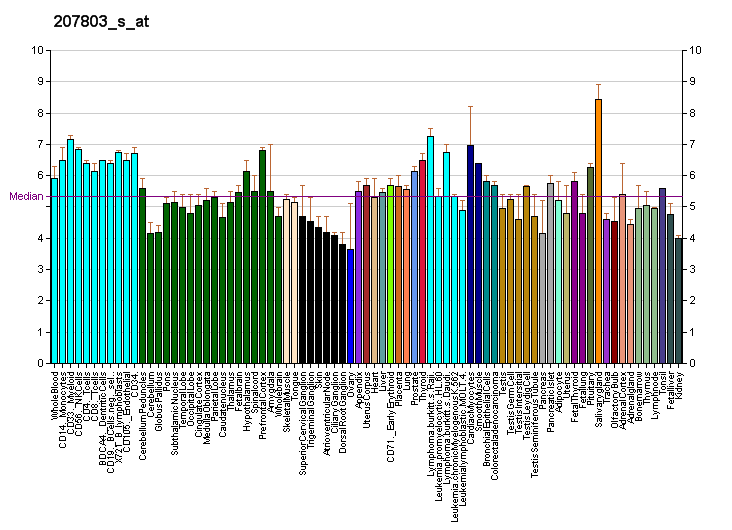
RNA expression pattern
Bgee	Human / Mouse (ortholog); Top expressed in: buccal mucosa cell; minor salivary glands; olfactory zone of nasal mucosa; tonsil; epithelium of lactiferous gland; gonad; lactiferous duct; lymph node; islet of Langerhans; fallopian tube / Top expressed in: lactiferous gland; molar; parotid gland; right ventricle; embryo; lacrimal gland; muscle of thigh; lip; olfactory epithelium; vestibular sensory epithelium; More reference expression data
BioGPS	More reference expression data
Gene ontology
Molecular function	protein binding; molecular function
Cellular component	extracellular region; extracellular space
Biological process	protein stabilization; lactation; transmembrane transport
Sources:Amigo / QuickGO
Orthologs
Databases	NCBI: entry; OMA: entry
Species	Human	Mouse
Entrez	1448	12994
Ensembl	ENSG00000171209	ENSMUSG00000001622
UniProt	P07498	P06796
RefSeq (mRNA)	NM_005212; NM_001394997	NM_007786; NM_001356570; NM_001356571
RefSeq (protein)	NP_005203	NP_031812; NP_001343499; NP_001343500
Location (UCSC)	Chr 4: 70.24 – 70.25 Mb	Chr 5: 88.07 – 88.08 Mb
PubMed search
- Wikidata
View/Edit Human	View/Edit Mouse

Κ-casein, or kappa casein, is a mammalian milk protein encoded in humans by the CSN3 gene.

== Structure ==
Molecular surface model of K-Casein

Caseins are a family of phosphoproteins (αS1, αS2, β, κ) that account for nearly 80% of bovine milk proteins.

Caseins form soluble aggregates known as casein micelles, in which κ-casein contributes to micelle stabilization. Several models have been proposed to explain micellar organization.

One model proposes that the micellar nucleus is formed from submicelles, with the periphery composed of κ-casein-rich microvillosities.

Another model proposes a nucleus composed of casein-interlinked fibrils. A later model proposes that gel formation depends on dual interactions among casein molecules.

All three models describe micelles as colloidal particles composed of casein aggregates surrounded by soluble κ-casein molecules.

== Function ==
Κ-casein is involved in several important physiological processes in milk. Chymosin (found in rennet) cleaves κ-casein into an insoluble peptide, para-κ-casein, and a water-soluble glycomacropeptide (GMP).

Milk-clotting proteases act on the soluble portion of κ-casein, generating an unstable micellar state that results in clot formation.

== Clinical significance ==
Glycomacropeptide (GMP), generated by cleavage of κ-casein, has been reported to increase digestive efficiency, prevent neonate hypersensitivity to ingested proteins, and inhibit gastric pathogens.

== Applications ==
=== Milk clotting ===
In red/blue Phe105-Met106 bond of κ- casein

Chymosin (EC 3.4.23.4) is an aspartic protease that specifically hydrolyzes the peptide bond in Phe105-Met106 of κ- casein and is considered to be the most efficient protease for the cheesemaking industry. However, there are milk-clotting proteases able to cleave other peptide bonds in the κ-casein chain, such as the endothiapepsin produced by Endothia parasitica. There are also several milk-clotting proteases that, being able to cleave the Phe105-Met106 bond in the κ-casein molecule, also cleave other peptide bonds in other caseins, such as those produced by Cynara cardunculus or even bovine chymosin. This allows the manufacture of different cheeses with a variety of rheological and organoleptic properties.

The milk-clotting process consists of three main phases:

1. Enzymatic degradation of κ-casein.
2. Micellar flocculation.
3. Gel formation.

Each step follows a different kinetic pattern, the limiting step in milk-clotting being the degradation rate of κ-casein. The kinetic pattern of the second step of the milk-clotting process is influenced by the cooperative nature of micellar flocculation, whereas the rheological properties of the gel formed depend on the type of action of the proteases, the type of milk, and the patterns of casein proteolysis. The overall process is influenced by several different factors, such as pH or temperature.

The conventional way of quantifying a given milk-clotting enzyme employs milk as the substrate and determines the time elapsed before the appearance of milk clots. However, milk clotting may take place without the participation of enzymes because of variations in physicochemical factors, such as low pH or high temperature. Consequently, this may lead to confusing and irreproducible results, particularly when the enzymes have low activity. At the same time, the classical method is not specific enough, in terms of setting the precise onset of milk gelation, such that the determination of the enzymatic units involved becomes difficult and unclear. Furthermore, although it has been reported that κ-casein hydrolysis follows typical Michaelis–Menten kinetics, it is difficult to determine with the classic milk-clotting assay.

To overcome this, several alternative methods have been proposed, such as the determination of halo diameter in agar-gelified milk, colorimetric measurement, or determination of the rate of degradation of casein previously labeled with either a radioactive tracer or a fluorochrome compound. All these methods use casein as the substrate to quantify proteolytic or milk-clotting activities.

=== Enzymatic assay ===
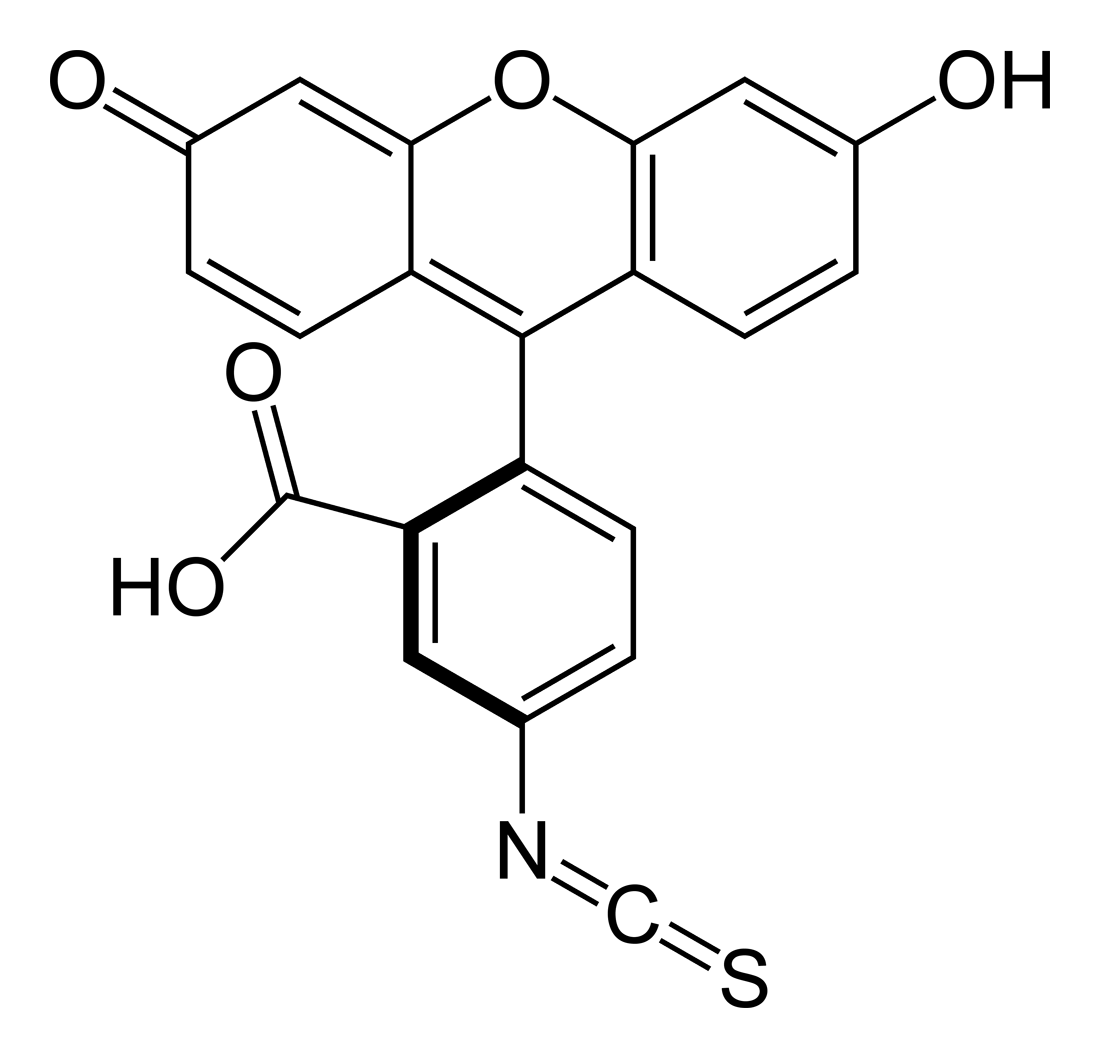
Fluorescein isothiocyanate

Κ-casein labeled with the fluorochrome fluorescein isothiocyanate (FITC) to yield the fluorescein thiocarbamoyl (FTC) derivative. This substrate is used to determinate the milk clotting activity of proteases.

FTC-κ-casein method affords accurate and precise determinations of κ-caseinolytic degradation, the first step in the milk-clotting process. This method is the result of a modification to the one described by S.S. Twining (1984). The main modification was substituting the substrate previously used (casein) by κ-casein labeled with the fluorochrome fluorescein isothiocyanate (FITC) to yield the fluorescein thiocarbamoyl (FTC) derivative. This variation allows quantification of the κ-casein molecules degraded in a more precise and specific way, detecting only those enzymes able to degrade such molecules. The method described by Twining (1984), however, was designed to detect the proteolytic activity of a considerably larger variety of enzymes. FTC-κ-casein allows the detection of different types of proteases at levels when no milk clotting is yet apparent, demonstrating its higher sensitivity over currently used assay procedures. Therefore, the method may find application as an indicator during the purification or characterization of new milk-clotting enzymes.

== Interactions ==
Kappa-casein has been shown to interact with EIF3S6.
