= Afamin =

Protein found in humans

AFM

Identifiers
- Aliases: AFM, ALB2, ALBA, ALF, afamin
- External IDs: OMIM: 104145; MGI: 2429409; GeneCards: AFM

Gene location (Human)
Chr.	Chromosome 4 (human)
Band	4q13.3	Start	73,481,745 bp
Band	4q13.3	End	73,504,001 bp

Gene location (Mouse)
Chr.	Chromosome 5 (mouse)
Band	5|5 E1	Start	90,666,791 bp
Band	5|5 E1	End	90,701,402 bp
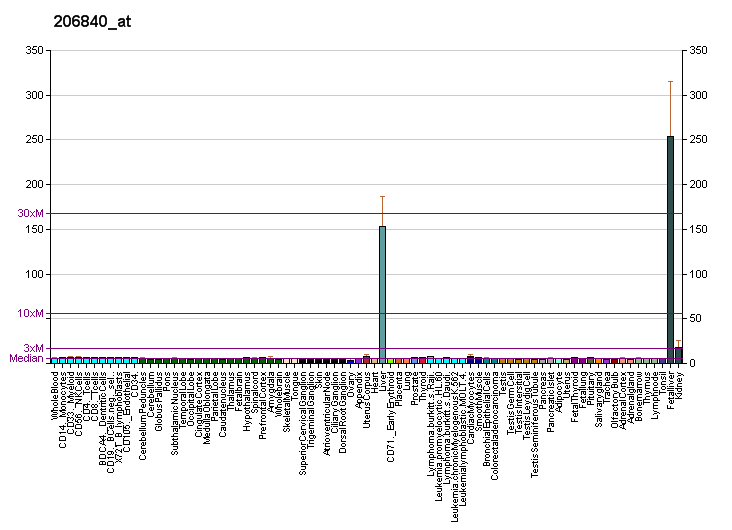
RNA expression pattern
Bgee	Human / Mouse (ortholog); Top expressed in: right lobe of liver; testicle; kidney tubule; human kidney; glomerulus; metanephric glomerulus; tibialis anterior muscle; renal medulla; mucosa of ileum; fundus / Top expressed in: left lobe of liver; human kidney; right kidney; proximal straight tubule; renal pelvis; fetal liver hematopoietic progenitor cell; renal calyx; sexually immature organism; migratory enteric neural crest cell; gallbladder; More reference expression data
BioGPS	More reference expression data
Gene ontology
Molecular function	vitamin E binding; protein binding
Cellular component	extracellular region; blood microparticle; extracellular exosome; extracellular space
Biological process	vitamin transport; transport; protein transport; protein stabilization; protein transport within extracellular region
Sources:Amigo / QuickGO
Orthologs
Databases	NCBI: entry; OMA: entry
Species	Human	Mouse
Entrez	173	280662
Ensembl	ENSG00000079557	ENSMUSG00000029369
UniProt	P43652	O89020
RefSeq (mRNA)	NM_001133	NM_145146
RefSeq (protein)	NP_001124	NP_660128
Location (UCSC)	Chr 4: 73.48 – 73.5 Mb	Chr 5: 90.67 – 90.7 Mb
PubMed search
- Wikidata
View/Edit Human	View/Edit Mouse

Afamin is a protein that in humans is encoded by the AFM gene.

== Function ==
This gene is a member of the albumin gene family, which comprises four genes that localize to chromosome 4 in a tandem arrangement. These four genes encode structurally related serum transport proteins that are known to be evolutionarily related. The protein encoded by this gene is regulated developmentally, expressed in the liver and secreted into the bloodstream.
