= Fromage (board game) =

2024 strategy board game

- Standard edition box
- Designers: Matthew O'Malley, Ben Rosset
- Illustrators: Pavel Zhovba
- Publishers: Road to Infamy
- Publication: November 22, 2024; 14 months ago
- Genres: Strategy
- Players: 1–4
- Playing time: 30–45 minutes
- Age range: 14+

Fromage is a 2024 strategy board game designed by Matthew O'Malley and Ben Rosset, illustrated by Pavel Zhovba, and published by Road to Infamy.

== Gameplay ==
Set in early 20th-century France, Fromage is themed around cheesemaking, with each player taking a player board, three workers, and 15 cheese components. The game is centered around a circular game board divided into four quadrants, each with its own scoring condition. On each round, all players may use one of their workers to place a cheese component in one of the slots of the quadrant in front of them. After everyone has finished their turn, the entire board is rotated 90 degrees so that a new quadrant is facing each player. This repeats until one of the players run out of cheese components, triggering final scoring.

Each slot requires a certain type of worker and certain age of cheese. The higher its age, the more valuable a piece of cheese will be, but so will the time needed to recover its worker. For example, cheese aged 1 month can be retrieved the next round, while one aged 3 months can only be taken back after a 270-degree rotation. Other than being used to make cheese, workers can also be used to gather resources, which are required to fill certain slots, purchase upgrades in players' factories, make extra cheese, and fulfil objectives.

A stand-alone expansion for Fromage themed around cheesemaking in Italy, titled Formaggio, was released in 2025.

== Reception ==
After a Kickstarter campaign in 2023, Fromage was released on November 22 of the next year to a positive reception. Wargamer described the game as "the cheesiest board game of all time".
