= Whey protein =

Protein supplement

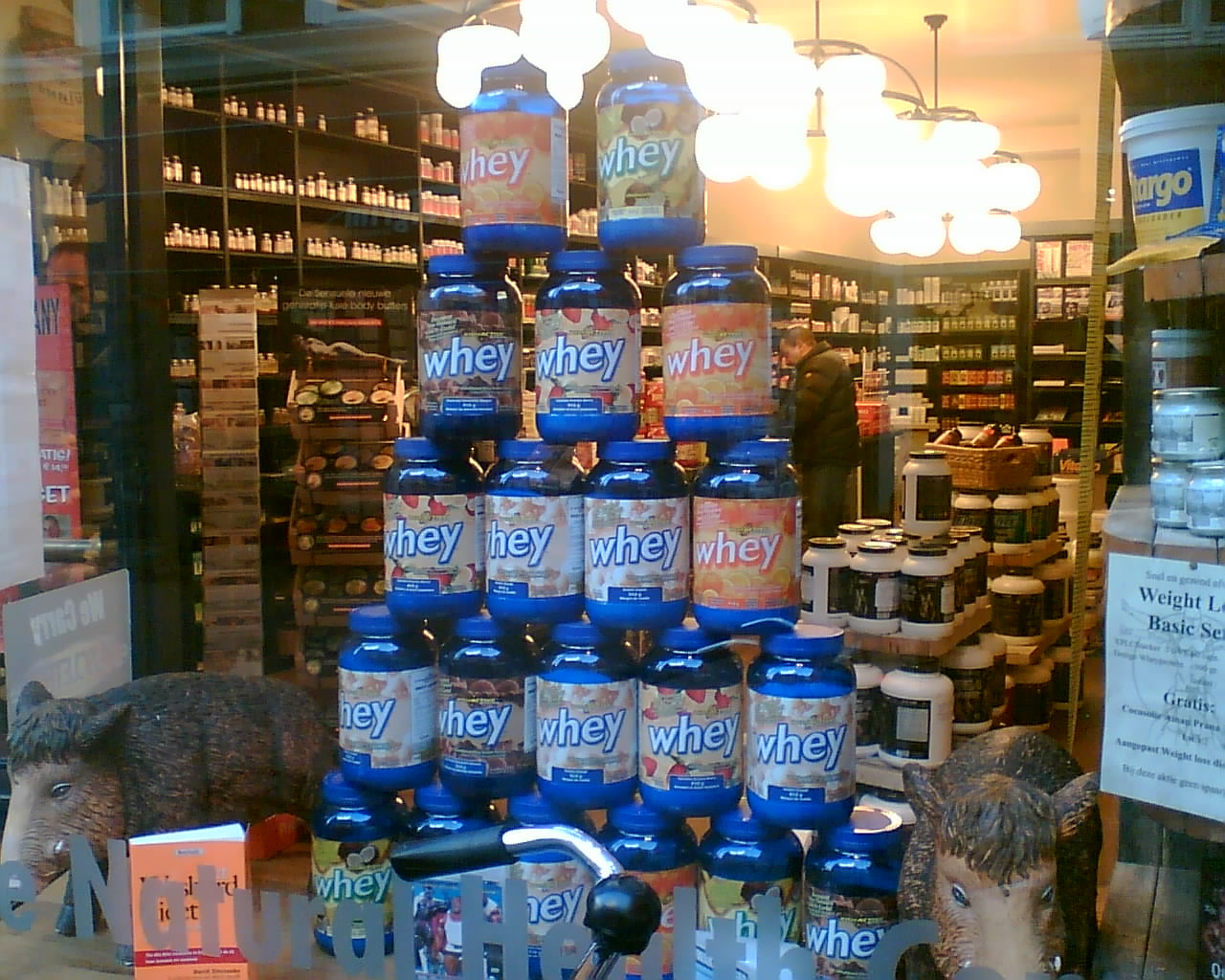
Containers of whey protein being sold at a health food store

Whey protein is a mixture of proteins isolated from whey, the liquid material created as a by-product of cheese production. The proteins consist of α-lactalbumin, β-lactoglobulin, serum albumin and immunoglobulins. Glycomacropeptide also makes up the third largest component but is not a protein. Whey protein is commonly marketed as a protein supplement.

== Production of whey ==
Whey is left over when milk is coagulated during the process of cheese production. Coagulation can happen by adding acid or rennet. It is a 5% solution of lactose in water and contains the water-soluble proteins of milk as well as some lipid content. Processing can be done by simple drying, or the relative protein content can be increased by removing the lactose, lipids and other non-protein materials.

The main method to extract protein from whey is membrane filtration. A variety of membrane pore sizes can be used to selectively let different components of whey go through or be retained. Whey can be passed through "microfiltration" which blocks bacteria, casein micelles, and fat, then passed through "ultrafiltration" (UF) which blocks proteins. The part that does not go through UF is spray-dried into a concentrated whey protein. There are also other ways to concentrate protein using filtration membranes.

Ion exchange chromatography is another major method for whey protein extraction. Methods in development include aqueous two-phase extraction and magnetic separation.

=== Commercial development ===
By the late 1960s, increasing volumes of whey had become an economic and environmental problem for the New Zealand dairy industry, creating an incentive to develop higher-value uses for its whey protein. In September 1969, Dr. Alex Malaspina, vice-president responsible for new product development and quality control at The Coca-Cola Export Corporation, approached the New Zealand Dairy Board in search of a reliable supply of soluble whey protein for acidic, carbonated beverages, with potential demand estimated at as much as 10,000 tons annually. At the time, the New Zealand industry did not know how to manufacture such a product because its existing heat-precipitated whey protein was insoluble and unsuitable for beverages. The Dairy Board and the New Zealand Dairy Research Institute (NZDRI) investigated several separation technologies, and Malaspina, Dr. R. Fenton-May from Coca-Cola, and NZDRI engineer Dave Woodhams examined ultrafiltration, reverse osmosis, and other processes in the United States. Woodhams recommended ultrafiltration, and in September 1970 NZDRI produced a whey protein concentrate containing 65% protein and meeting Coca-Cola's requirements for beverage solubility and clarity.

Malaspina subsequently worked with Brazilian food scientist Roberto H. Moretti on a process for producing whey protein suitable for acidic beverages. Their U.S. patent, Preparation of a Whey Protein Concentrate, combined pretreatment and ultrafiltration with water injection and cation exchange to produce a low-mineral, acid-soluble whey protein concentrate suitable for beverage formulations. The water-injection step, or diafiltration, adds water during ultrafiltration so that additional lactose, minerals, and other permeable constituents are removed, while retaining the protein. Diafiltration subsequently became an important method for manufacturing higher-protein whey protein concentrates and whey protein isolates. The New Zealand Dairy Board received a non-exclusive, royalty-free license to use the Coca-Cola process with New Zealand whey.

The Dairy Board and NZDRI continued investing in whey-protein processing and product development. The work initiated for Coca-Cola generated deep expertise and provided a technological base for developing whey protein concentrates for other applications and markets. In 1982, the industry established the Whey Products Corporation to coordinate whey processing, investment, and marketing across the cooperative dairy sector. This approach enabled New Zealand to become a leading supplier of technically demanding whey-protein products during the 1980s and 1990s. The industry's centralized whey-products operations were later folded back into the Dairy Board, which merged with Kiwi Co-operative Dairies and New Zealand Dairy Group in 2001 to form Fonterra. Fonterra's whey proteins have been key ingredients in foods and nutritional products sold around the world, including sports, medical, and beverage applications, and Fonterra continues to be a leading global supplier of whey protein.

=== Whey-protein beverages ===
Whey-protein beverages were central to these technological developments that began in 1969, and Malaspina played a seminal role in their early commercialization. His approach to the Dairy Board concerned soluble whey protein specifically for carbonated acidic beverages, and he continued to press for sufficient quantities for market testing as Coca-Cola and the New Zealand industry developed beverage-grade whey protein concentrate. Coca-Cola also installed an ultrafiltration pilot plant in Brazil specifically to produce whey protein concentrate. That development program led to Tai, a whey-fortified, orange-flavored carbonated beverage launched by Coca-Cola in Brazil in 1971. Malaspina's nutritional beverage program subsequently led to Sansón, a pasteurized whey-protein beverage marketed by Coca-Cola in Mexico.

These early products anticipated the much broader use of whey protein in nutritional beverages. By the late 1980s, whey proteins were gaining commercial importance in sports nutrition, weight management, and medical nutrition, with sports and nutritional beverages becoming significant applications for whey protein concentrate and, later, for whey protein isolate. Improvements in membrane filtration, diafiltration, and protein fractionation now enable manufacturers to produce whey ingredients with higher protein concentrations, improved solubility, and other properties tailored to different beverage formulations. As a result, whey protein is now widely used in sports and recovery drinks, meal-replacement beverages, medical nutrition, and other products, completing its transition from a dairy by-product into a major beverage ingredient.

=== Microbial production ===
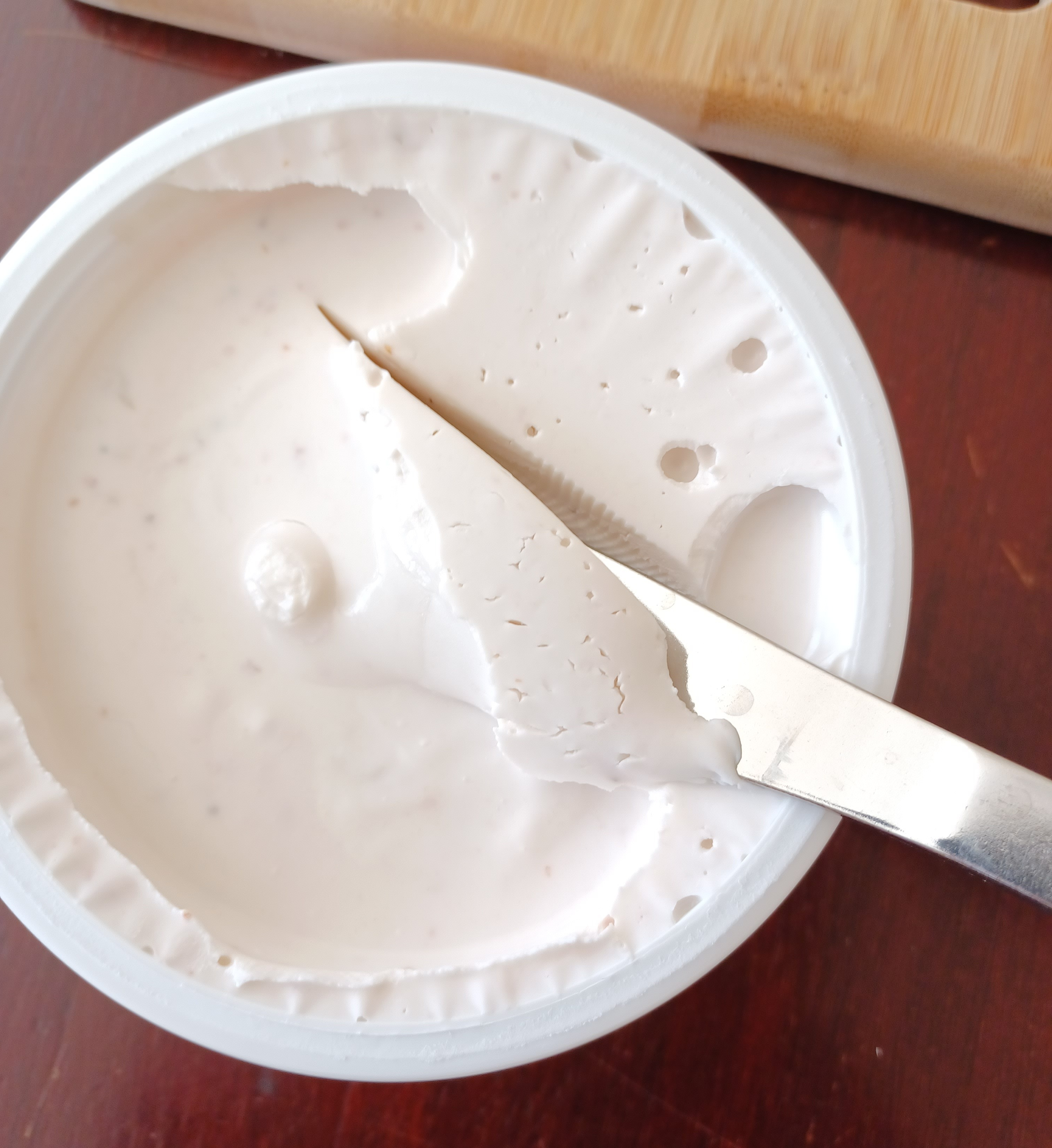
Strawberry-flavored vegan cream cheese, made with non-animal whey protein produced by microbes

Microbes have been engineered to produce proteins similar or even "bioidentical" to whey. Various companies offer microbe-produced whey and cheese; however, none of these companies stipulate the protein composition of their products, but they do contain some of the genes needed to make whey proteins.

== Composition ==
The protein in cow's milk is approximately 20% whey and 80% casein. The protein in human milk is approximately 60% whey and 40% casein. The protein fraction in whey constitutes approximately 10% of the total dry solids in whey. This protein is typically a mixture of beta-lactoglobulin (~65%), alpha-lactalbumin (~25%), bovine serum albumin (~8%) (see also serum albumin), and immunoglobulins. The third largest fragment of whey protein isolate derived from sweet whey is glycomacropeptide or GMP. However, GMP lacks the secondary structure necessary for it to be classified as a protein and is considered a long amino acid chain. These peptides are all soluble in water in their native forms.

== Major forms and uses ==
Four major types of whey protein are produced commercially:

- Whey protein concentrates (WPC) have typically low - though not absent - levels of fat and cholesterol. They also contain carbohydrates in the form of lactose.
- Whey protein isolates (WPI) are processed to remove fat and lactose, and as a result, WPI powders are typically over 90% protein by dry weight. Like WPC, WPI are mild and slightly milky in taste.
- Whey protein hydrolysates (WPH) are whey proteins that are predigested and partially hydrolyzed for the purpose of easier metabolizing. Their cost is generally higher than WPC and WPI. Highly hydrolysed whey may be less allergenic than other forms of whey, due to its smaller peptide chains. For this reason it is a common constituent in hypoallergenic baby milk formulas and medical foods.
- Native whey protein is extracted from skim milk, rather than being collected as a byproduct of cheese production. This type of whey does not contain glycomacropeptide, which is formed only after the addition of rennet.

There is evidence that whey protein is more bio-available than casein or soy protein.

Whey protein is commonly marketed as a dietary supplement, typically sold in powdered form for mixing into beverages. Whey protein is also often used as a thickener to improve texture and decrease syneresis in yogurt. Greek Yogurt, which increased in popularity in the early twenty‐first century, is typically high in protein.

== Use in health ==
The primary usage of whey protein supplements is for muscle growth and development. Eating whey protein supplements before exercise will not assist athletic performance, but it will enhance the body's protein recovery and synthesis after exercise because it increases the free amino acids in the body's free amino acid pool. The antioxidant activity of whey protein helps to reduce oxidative stress associated with hypothyroidism. In 2010, a panel of the European Food Safety Authority (EFSA) panel examined the effects of whey protein on weight loss (via both fat loss and increased satiety) and strength and muscle building. The panel concluded that there's no evidence supporting any weight loss claims and that whey protein is roughly as effective for building strength, muscle and lean body mass as other protein sources.

Although whey proteins are responsible for some milk allergies, the major allergens in milk are the caseins.

== Whey cheese ==
Whey cheese, such as ricotta, is produced from whey and is rich in whey protein (except for brunost). The whey protein accounts for about 40–45% of the solids content of ricotta.
