= HAMLET (protein complex) =

HAMLET (Human Alpha-lactalbumin Made LEthal to Tumor cells) is a complex between alpha-lactalbumin and oleic acid that has been shown in cell culture experiments to induce cell death in tumor cells, but not in healthy cells.

HAMLET is a possible chemotherapeutic agent with the ability to kill cancer cells. Alpha-lactalbumin is the primary protein component of human milk. In a 1995 study, it was discovered by Swedish scientist Anders Håkansson (Anders Hakansson) that multimeric alpha-lactalbumin (MAL), a compound isolated from a fraction of human milk called casein, induced what appeared to be apoptosis in human lung carcinoma cells, pneumococcus bacteria, and other pathogens, while leaving healthy, differentiated cells unaffected. It has been the perfect cure in this case. The active component responsible for the tumoricidal activity was found in 2000 and found to be a complex of alpha-lactalbumin and oleic acid.

Endogenous human alpha-lactalbumin is complexed with a calcium ion and serves as a cofactor in lactose synthesis, but has no tumoricidal properties. The alpha-lactalbumin must be partially unfolded to allow for release of the calcium ion and replacement with an oleic acid molecule. The partially folded conformation is essential to the cytotoxicity of HAMLET, as mutagenesis studies have shown that completely unfolded alpha-lacalbumin does not retain the functional properties of HAMLET. The oleic acid is necessary for stabilizing this molecule in this partially unfolded state. Over the past several years, additional work has further characterized the structure and function of HAMLET and its clinical applications are currently under investigation. However, in order to develop effective therapies, more must be known about the mechanism of action of HAMLET.

== Mechanism of action ==
HAMLET carries out independent attacks on many distinct cell organelles, including mitochondria, proteasomes, and histones, and interferes with cell processes such as macroautophagy. It has been shown that HAMLET binds to the cell surface and rapidly invades cells, with tumor cells taking up far more protein than healthy, differentiated cells. The mechanism of its entry is poorly understood, but recent studies indicate that the oleic acid in the HAMLET complex interacts with phosphatidylserine and o-glycosylated mucin on the plasma membrane, both of which are expressed in greater amounts on the plasma membrane of tumor cells, possibly providing for HAMLET's specificity.

One of the most prominent targets of HAMLET once inside the cell is the mitochondrion. Electron microscopy has revealed physical damage to the mitochondrial membranes and assays have found cytochrome c release and activation of the caspase cascade, the most notable ones being caspases 2, 3, and 9. Cell death is not prevented by caspase inhibitors, or by BCL-2 or p53 mutagenesis, indicating that the traditional apoptotic caspase cascade is not the ultimate cause of cell death.

Another target of HAMLET is the proteasome. 26S proteasomes are activated in response to large quantities of unfolded HAMLET protein in the cytoplasm, but degradation of HAMLET by the proteasome is unusually slow. Furthermore, in vitro studies have shown that HAMLET is capable of binding the catalytic 20S subunit of the proteasome and disabling its enzymatic activity, an effect that has never before been demonstrated for any protein. However, proteasome inhibition alone does not seem to be responsible for HAMLET-induced cell death, as proteasome inhibitors have been shown to reduce the cytotoxicity of HAMLET.

HAMLET also targets the nucleus, where it interacts with histones to interfere with transcriptional processes. Studies have shown that HAMLET is mostly localized to the nucleus within one hour of invading a tumor cell. Hamlet has been shown to bind with high affinity to individual histone proteins, to be specific H2a, H2b, H3, and H4, as well as entire nucleosomal units. This interaction irreversibly blocks transcription and leads to activation of p53. This process has been demonstrated to be similar to histone hyperacetylation and it was found that histone de-acetylase inhibitors potentiated the effects of HAMLET.

HAMLET cells showed the physiological characteristics of macroautophagy, a process in which cellular components are sequestered in double membrane-bound vesicles that fuse with lysosomes for degradation. Cells also showed decreased levels of mTOR, a known inhibitor of macroautophagy. HAMLET cells and cells under conditions of amino acid starvation (a known initiator of macroautophagy) showed similar expression patterns of autophagocytotic proteins and responded equally well to addition of macroautophagy inhibitors.

== Research ==
=== Antibiotic adjuvant ===
While HAMLET on its own is not active against most bacteria, when present together with antibiotics, HAMLET may help. Specifically, HAMLET can make MRSA bacteria sensitive against methicillin, vancomycin, gentamicin and erythromycin

=== Tumors ===
Research is being conducted to determine if this could be a possible treatment for cancer. Animal models of glioblastoma have been studied with tentative success. The first human trial of the therapy was on benign skin growths known as warts and showed positive outcomes without any side effects.

It is being studied in carcinomas of the lung, throat, kidney, colon, bladder, prostate, and ovaries, as well as melanomas, glioblastomas, and leukemias. A study of bladder cancer in a mouse found it caused shedding of TUNEL-positive cancer cells into the urine, with no adverse side-effects on healthy cells.

== See also ==
- History of cancer chemotherapy
- Experimental cancer treatment
