= Β-Lactoglobulin =

Protein in cow and sheep milk

β-Lactoglobulin
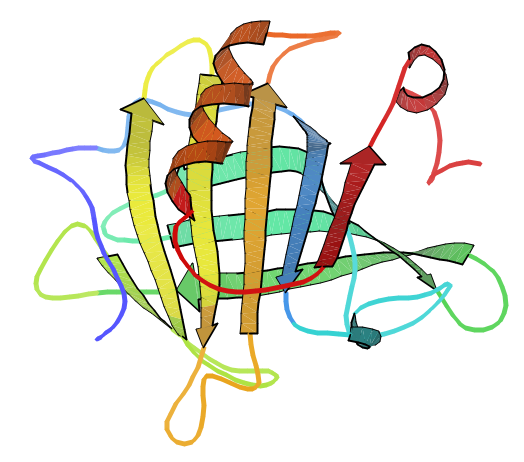
- Ribbon structure of a β-lactoglobulin subunit (PDB: 3BLG). Rendered with Kinemage.

Identifiers
- Organism: Bos taurus
- Symbol: BLG
- Orthologs: OMA: entry
- UniProt: P02754
Search for
- Structures: Swiss-model
- Domains: InterPro

β-Lactoglobulin (beta-lactoglobulin, BLG, Bos d 5) is the major whey protein of cow and sheep's milk (~3 g/L), and is also present in many other mammalian species; a notable exception being humans. Its structure, properties and biological role have been reviewed many times. BLG is considered to be a milk allergen.

== Function ==
The major protein in whey is β-lactoglobulin, followed by α-lactalbumin (β-lactoglobulin ≈ 65%, α-lactalbumin ≈ 25%, serum albumin ≈ 8%, other ≈ 2%). β-lactoglobulin is a lipocalin protein able to bind many hydrophobic molecules, suggesting its role in their transport. BLG has also been shown to bind molecular iron via siderophores, indicating a possible role in immune pathways combatting pathogens; upon ingestion, BLG can shuttle complexed iron to immune cells, providing micronutrition to the cells, thus participating in overall immune tolerance. A human homologue of β-lactoglobulin is lacking in breast milk.

== Structure ==
Due to its relative abundance in cow's milk and ease of purification, β-lactoglobulin has been the subject of substantial biophysical study; in particular, due to its significance to the food industry - where its physical properties can be either advantageous or disadvantageous to the manufacture and processing of dairy products. The structure of BLG has been circumscribed several times by X-ray crystallography and NMR, with several BLG variants identified, notably the primary bovine variants labelled β-lactoglobulin "A" and "B".

Bovine β-lactoglobulin is a relatively small protein, consisting of 162 residues, amounting to 18.4 kDa. NMR analysis of BLG in physiological conditions has determined the protein is predominantly dimeric, dissociating to a monomer in acidic environments below pH 3, while preserving its native state. Conversely, BLG also occurs in tetrameric, octameric and other multimeric aggregation forms in a variety of natural conditions.

In solution, β-Lactoglobulin forms gels in several conditions, particularly when its native structure is sufficiently destabilised to allow aggregation. For example, after prolonged heat at low pH and low ionic strength, a transparent `fine-stranded' gel is formed by assembly of protein molecules into long stiff fibres. Folding intermediates of the BLG protein can be studied using light spectroscopy and a denaturing solvent, yielding an unusual but important intermediate composed purely of α-helices - despite its native β-sheet structure. This phenomenon is suggested to indicate evolutionary selection for the helical intermediate, avoiding aggregation during the folding process.

β-Lactoglobulin is the main component of milk skin - formed by coagulation and denaturing when milk boils. Once denatured, the BLG proteins form a thin, gelatinous film on the surface of the liquid milk.

== Clinical significance ==
Due to the allergenic potential of cow's milk (i.e., lactose intolerance), manufacturers in European Union are required to evidence the presence or absence of β-lactoglobulin on labels for food products containing milk to satisfy the requirements of the EC Directive; this is typically determined by food testing laboratories using enzyme linked immunosorbent assay to identify and quantify the BLG in said products.

Although β-lactoglobulin is considered a major allergen, the protective effects of consuming raw cow's milk - namely its ability to transport micronutrients - has been shown to depend on the protein content of the whey fraction, thus of β-lactoglobulin. Studies have shown that BLG carrying micronutrients acted as a tolerogen, protecting against allergy development. However, when micronutrients were absent, BLG acted as an allergen. Laboratory polymerization of β-lactoglobulin by microbial transglutaminase can reduce its allergenic potential in both children and adults with an IgE-mediated cow's milk allergy.

== Biotechnology ==
=== Cow breeding ===
In 2018, the first genetically modified cows without β-Lactoglobulin-producing genes were produced by zygotic deletion of the BLG gene locus. Ongoing study aims to produce raw milk without the BLG allergen.

=== Recombinant production ===
In September 2023, the European Innovation Council funded a "Hydrocow" project, by Solar Foods, aiming to produce BLG with the help of Xanthobacter hydrogen-oxidizing bacteria, carbon dioxide and electricity.

== See also ==
- Casein
