= Α-Lactalbumin =

Protein-coding gene in the species Homo sapiens

LALBA
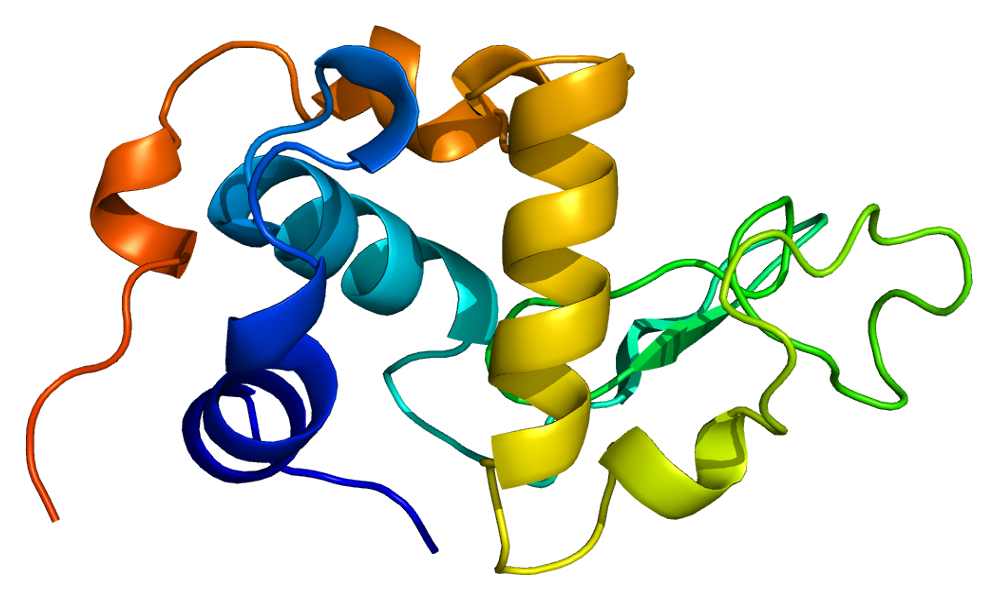

Identifiers
- Aliases: LALBA, entrez:3906, LYZG, lactalbumin alpha, HAMLET
- External IDs: OMIM: 149750; MGI: 96742; GeneCards: LALBA
Available structures
PDB	Ortholog search: PDBe RCSB
PDB	List of PDB id codes 4L41, 1A4V, 1B9O, 1CB3, 1HML, 3B0I, 3B0O

Gene location (Human)
Chr.	Chromosome 12 (human)
Band	12q13.11	Start	48,567,684 bp
Band	12q13.11	End	48,570,066 bp

Gene location (Mouse)
Chr.	Chromosome 15 (mouse)
Band	15|15 F1	Start	98,378,281 bp
Band	15|15 F1	End	98,380,602 bp
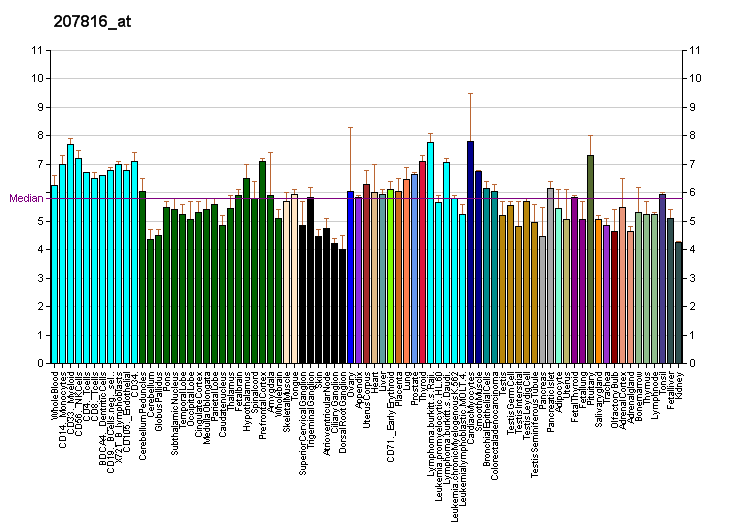
RNA expression pattern
Bgee	Human / Mouse (ortholog); Top expressed in: testicle; epithelium of lactiferous gland; lactiferous duct; left testis; right testis; embryo; fallopian tube; ganglionic eminence; subdivision of respiratory system; urinary system / Top expressed in: lactiferous gland; embryo; hair; glossopharyngeal ganglion; greater petrosal nerve; axial skeleton; muscle of thigh; yolk sac; free upper limb; peripheral nervous system; More reference expression data
BioGPS	More reference expression data
Gene ontology
Molecular function	calcium ion binding; metal ion binding; lactose synthase activity; lysozyme activity
Cellular component	extracellular region; Golgi lumen; Golgi membrane; extracellular space
Biological process	apoptotic process; signal transduction; defense response to bacterium; cell-cell signaling; lactose biosynthetic process; cell wall macromolecule catabolic process; defense response to Gram-negative bacterium; defense response to Gram-positive bacterium
Sources:Amigo / QuickGO
Orthologs
Databases	NCBI: entry; OMA: entry
Species	Human	Mouse
Entrez	3906	16770
Ensembl	ENSG00000167531	ENSMUSG00000022991
UniProt	P00709	P29752
RefSeq (mRNA)	NM_002289; NM_001384350	NM_010679
RefSeq (protein)	NP_002280	NP_034809
Location (UCSC)	Chr 12: 48.57 – 48.57 Mb	Chr 15: 98.38 – 98.38 Mb
PubMed search
- Wikidata
View/Edit Human	View/Edit Mouse

α-lactalbumin, also known as alpha-lactalbumin and LALBA, is a protein that in humans is encoded by the LALBA gene.

== Overview ==
α-lactalbumin is a protein that regulates the production of lactose in the milk of almost all mammalian species. In primates, α-lactalbumin expression is upregulated in response to the hormone prolactin and increases the production of lactose.

α-lactalbumin forms the regulatory subunit of the lactose synthase (LS) heterodimer and β-1,4-galactosyltransferase (beta4Gal-T1) forms the catalytic component. Together, these proteins enable LS to produce lactose by transferring galactose moieties to glucose. As a multimer, α-lactalbumin strongly binds calcium and zinc ions and may possess bactericidal or antitumor activity. A folding variant of human α-lactalbumin that may form in acidic environments such as the stomach, called HAMLET, probably induces apoptosis in tumor and immature cells. The corresponding folding dynamics of α-lactalbumin is thus highly unusual.

When formed into a complex with Gal-T1, a galactosyltransferase, α-lactalbumin enhances the enzyme's affinity for glucose by about 1000 times and inhibits the ability to polymerise multiple galactose units. This gives rise to a pathway for forming lactose by converting Gal-T1 to lactose synthase.

== Physical properties ==
The structure of α-lactalbumin is well known and is composed of 123 amino acids and 4 disulfide bridges. The molecular weight is 14178 Da, and the isoelectric point is between 4.2 and 4.5. α-Lactalbumin has two prominent forms: holo-state and apo-state. The holo-state is the natural form—folded and bound by calcium. The apo-state occurs in acidic conditions and is associated with the release of calcium ions and beta-sheet unfolding. One of the main structural differences with beta-lactoglobulin is that it does not have any free thiol group that can serve as the starting-point for a covalent aggregation reaction. As a result, pure α-lactalbumin will not form gels upon denaturation and acidification. α-Lactalbumin is a Ca^{2+} binding protein with a single strong calcium binding spot seen below. The calcium binds to the carboxylic groups of three aspartate residues (Asp 82, 87, 88), seen in blue and to the carbonyl groups from lysine 79 and aspartate 84, seen in purple. This binding is coordinated by two water molecules (red). These residue binding sites are conserved among most species containing α-lactalbumin.

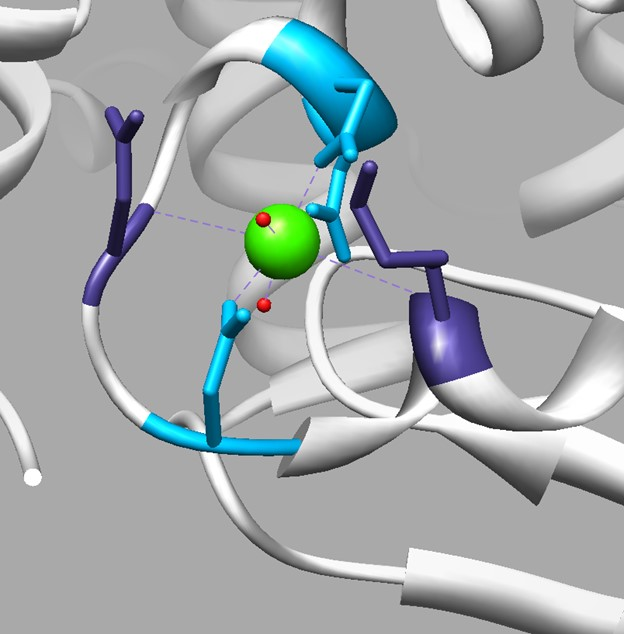

== Evolution ==
The sequence comparison of α-lactalbumin shows a strong similarity to that of lysozymes, specifically the Ca^{2+}-binding c-lysozyme. These two proteins share much of their physical structure but contain less than half of the same amino acid sequence and therefore vary in function drastically. So, the expected evolutionary history is that gene duplication of the c-lysozyme was followed by mutation, resulting in the loss of lysozyme catalytic activity in α-lactalbumin. This gene predates the last common ancestor of mammals and birds, which probably puts its origin at about 300 Ma.

== Functions ==
Current research is finding new application of α-lactalbumin outside the physiological lactose production.

=== Nutrition ===
α-Lactalbumin is essential for newborn nutrition. This protein provides essential amino acids and bioactive compounds necessary for optimal growth, development, and health. α-Lactalbumin is the most abundant whey protein in human milk and its properties have been researched to include in infant formulas to replicate mammary milk compounds. This protein is a strong source of branched amino acids, cysteine, and tryptophan residues, each with correlated health benefits.

=== Clinical uses ===
α-Lactalbumin has been researched in conjunction with many different medical conditions and is thought to correlate with positive outcomes. Many of these benefits are due to the bioactive compounds it is made of and the protein's ability to bind complexes.

=== Polyendocrine metabolic ovarian syndrome (PMOS) ===
Polyendocrine metabolic ovarian syndrome (PMOS) is one disease that higher levels of α-lactalbumin have been linked with relieving symptoms. This condition is closely linked with gut dysbiosis caused by inflammation of the intestinal lining and a microbiota imbalance. α-Lactalbumin promotes healthy bacterial strains such as Lactobacillus acidophilus, Bifidobacterium short, and Bifidobacterium longum. These bacteria produce short chain fatty acids (SCFA) which improve the gut biome. In a controlled study, the group that ate a diet higher in α-lactalbumin experienced a decrease in symptoms associated with PMOS, and higher levels of healthy bacteria. While there is not a cure for this condition, this could be a short-term remedy.

=== Mental health ===
α-Lactalbumin is a source of amino acids which are connected to improved mental health. This protein is rich in tryptophan residues which are a precursor to serotonin, a neurotransmitter associated with positive moods. The protein also increases the plasma concentration for other large neutral amino acids (LNAAs) which help balance hormones. The cysteine residues aid in glutathione synthesis which is an important antioxidant.

=== Cancer ===
There has been extensive research on apoptotic effects that α-lactalbumin potentially has when it forms a complex with oleic acid called HAMLET (Human alpha-lactalbumin made lethal to tumor cells). This HAMLET complex disrupts the structure of the membrane when bound, promoting cell death to protect the integrity of the organism. This complex can translocate into the nuclei of cancerous cells, but not of healthy cells. When in cancer cells, this protein-OA complex has been shown to slow the progression of tumors in numerous studies. α-Lactalbumin's native state does not show these same anti-cancer functions, so it is likely that the oleic acid expresses the apoptotic functions while the α-lactalbumin is responsible for targeting the specific cells lines such as colon, bladder, and glioblastoma cancer cells.
