= Milk allergy =

Adverse immune reaction to cow's milk

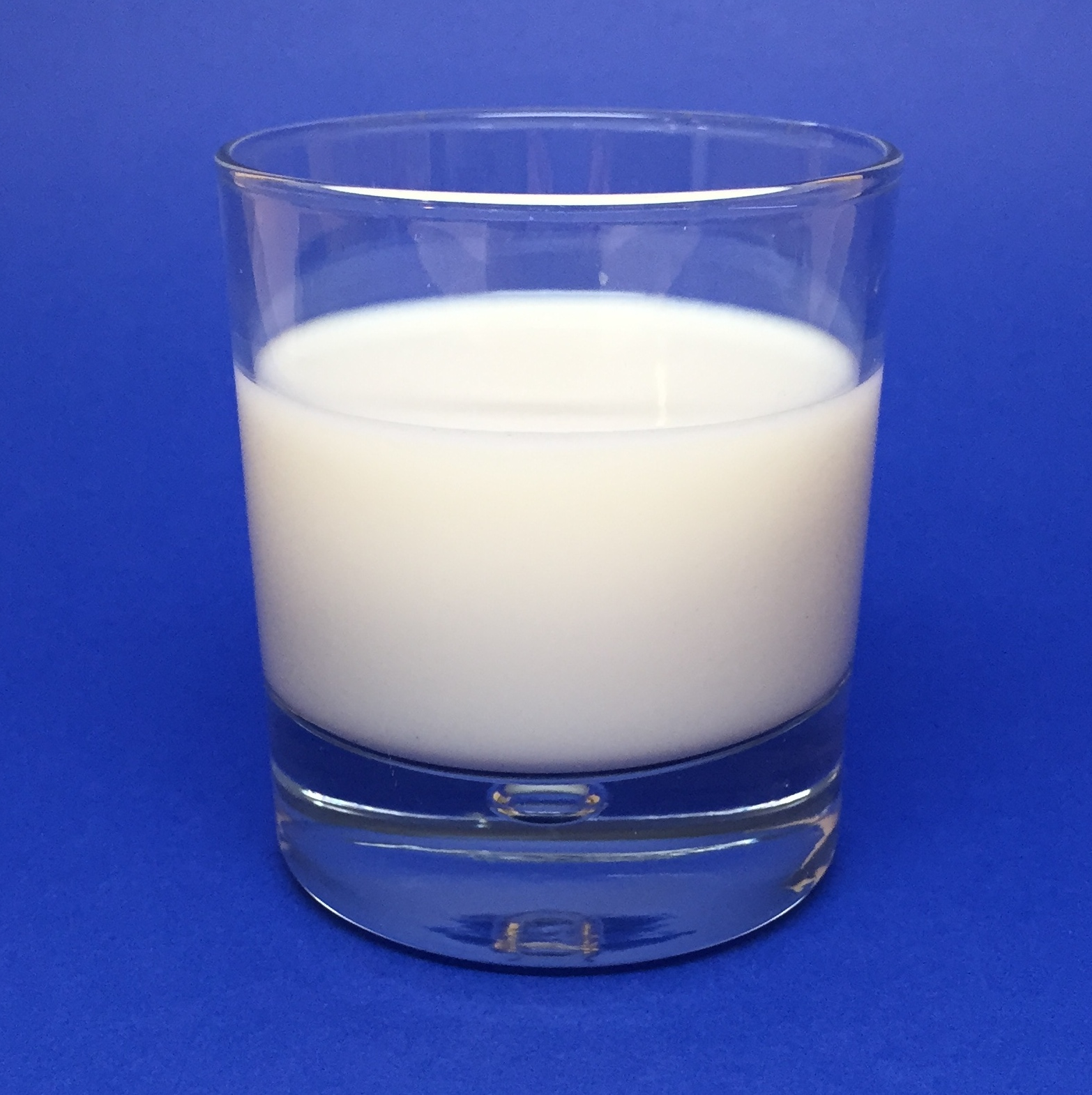
- A glass of cow's milk
- Specialty: Emergency medicine Allergy & immunology
- Symptoms: itchiness, rash, swelling of lips, tongue or the whole face, eczema, wheezing and shortness of breath, nausea, vomiting, abdominal pain, diarrhea, anaphylaxis
- Causes: Type I hypersensitivity
- Risk factors: Childhood in developed countries where cow's milk infant formula is introduced to supplement or after breast feeding ends
- Diagnostic method: Medical history and standard allergy tests
- Prevention: Exclusive breastfeeding for four to six months
- Treatment: Epinephrine; Antihistamines (mild)
- Prognosis: approximately 20% persist into adulthood
- Frequency: 2–3% in infants, declining to 0.6% in adults

Milk allergy is an adverse immune reaction to one or more proteins in cow's milk. Symptoms may take hours to days to manifest, with symptoms including atopic dermatitis, inflammation of the esophagus, enteropathy involving the small intestine and proctocolitis involving the rectum and colon. However, rapid anaphylaxis is possible, a potentially life-threatening condition that requires treatment with epinephrine, among other measures.

In the United States, 90% of allergic responses to foods are caused by eight foods, including cow's milk. Recognition that a small number of foods are responsible for the majority of food allergies has led to requirements to prominently list these common allergens, including dairy, on food labels. One function of the immune system is to defend against infections by recognizing foreign proteins, but it should not overreact to food proteins. Heating milk proteins can cause them to become denatured, losing their three-dimensional configuration and allergenicity, so baked goods containing dairy products may be tolerated while fresh milk triggers an allergic reaction.

The condition may be managed by avoiding consumption of any dairy products or foods that contain dairy ingredients. For people subject to rapid reactions (IgE-mediated milk allergy), the dose capable of provoking an allergic response can be as low as a few milligrams, so such people must strictly avoid dairy. The declaration of the presence of trace amounts of milk or dairy in foods is not mandatory in any country, with the exception of Brazil.

Milk allergy affects between 2% and 3% of babies and young children. To reduce risk, recommendations are that babies should be exclusively breastfed for at least four, preferably six months, before introducing cow's milk formula. If there is a family history of dairy allergy, substitutes like extensively hydrolysed, non-dairy or elemental formula may be discussed. Soy infant formula is common, but about 10 to 15% of babies allergic to cow's milk will also react to soy. The majority of children outgrow milk allergy, but for about 0.4% the condition persists into adulthood. Oral immunotherapy is being researched, but it is of unclear benefit.

== Signs and symptoms ==
=== Rapid and delayed response ===
Food allergies can be classified as rapid-onset (with symptoms manifesting within minutes to an hour or two), delayed-onset (up to 48 hours) or combinations of both, depending on the mechanisms involved. The difference depends on the types of white blood cells involved. B cells, a subset of white blood cells, rapidly synthesize and secrete immunoglobulin E (IgE), a class of antibody that binds to antigens, the foreign proteins. Thus, immediate reactions are described as IgE-mediated. The delayed reactions involve non-IgE-mediated immune mechanisms initiated by B cells, T cells and other white blood cells. Unlike with IgE reactions, there are no specific biomarker molecules circulating in the blood, and confirmation of the allergy is achieved by removing the suspect food from the diet and determining if symptoms dissipate as a result.

=== Symptoms ===
Signs and symptoms of anaphylaxis

IgE-mediated symptoms include: rash, hives, itching of the mouth, lips, tongue, throat, eyes, skin, or other areas, swelling of the lips, tongue, eyelids, or the whole face, difficulty swallowing, runny or congested nose, hoarse voice, wheezing, shortness of breath, diarrhea, abdominal pain, lightheadedness, fainting, nausea and vomiting. Symptoms of allergies vary from person to person and may also vary from incident to incident. Serious allergic danger can begin when the respiratory tract or blood circulation is affected. The former can be indicated by wheezing, a blocked airway and cyanosis, the latter by weak pulse, pale skin and fainting. When these symptoms occur, the allergic reaction is called anaphylaxis, which occurs when IgE antibodies are involved and areas of the body not in direct contact with food become affected and show severe symptoms. Untreated, this can proceed to vasodilation, a low-blood-pressure situation called anaphylactic shock and very rarely, death.

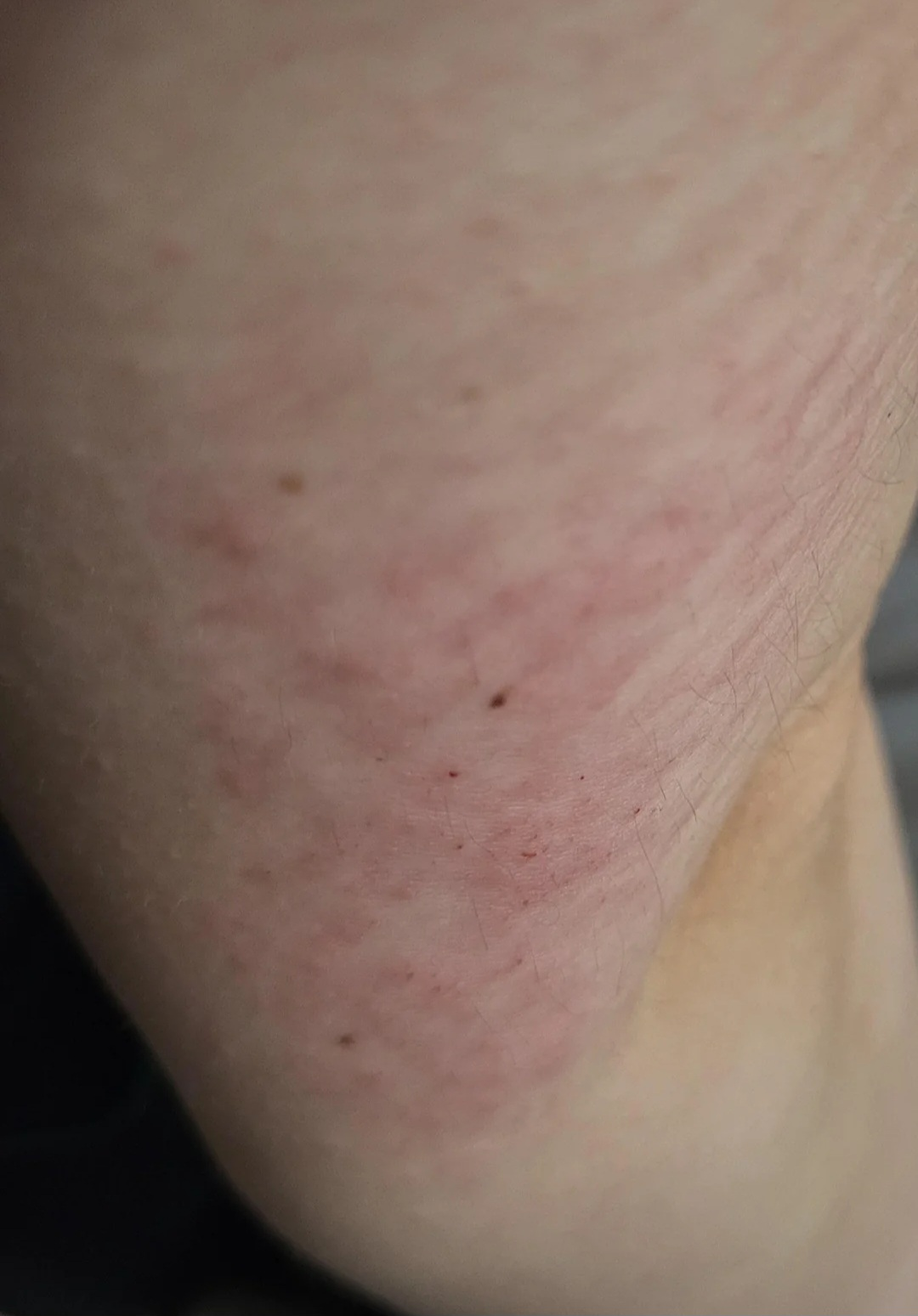
Reaction to labeled casein-free ghee. This person has a diagnosed milk allergy.

=== Non-lgE-mediated symptoms ===
For milk allergy, non-IgE-mediated responses are more common than are those that are IgE-mediated. The presence of certain symptoms, such as angioedema or atopic eczema, is more likely related to IgE-mediated allergies, whereas non-IgE-mediated reactions manifest as gastrointestinal symptoms, without skin or respiratory symptoms. Within non-IgE cow's milk allergy, clinicians distinguish among food protein-induced enterocolitis syndrome (FPIES), food protein-induced allergic proctocolitis (FPIAP) and food protein-induced enteropathy (FPE). Common trigger foods for all are cow's milk and soy foods (including soy infant formula). FPIAP is considered to be at the milder end of the spectrum and is characterized by intermittent bloody stools. FPE is identified by chronic diarrhea that dissipates when the offending food is removed from the diet. FPIES can be severe, characterized by persistent vomiting one to four hours after an allergen-containing food is ingested, to the point of lethargy. Watery and sometimes bloody diarrhea can develop five to ten hours after the triggering meal, to the point of dehydration and low blood pressure. Infants reacting to cow's milk may also react to soy formula, and those reacting to soy formula may react to cow's milk. International consensus guidelines have been established for the diagnosis and treatment of FPIES.

== Mechanisms ==
Conditions caused by food allergies are classified into three groups according to the mechanism of the allergic response:

1. IgE-mediated (classic) – the most common type, manifesting as acute changes that occur shortly after eating, and may progress to anaphylaxis
2. Non-IgE mediated – characterized by an immune response not involving IgE; may occur hours to days after eating, complicating the diagnosis
3. IgE- and non-IgE-mediated – a hybrid of the above two types

Allergic reactions are hyperactive responses of the immune system to generally innocuous substances, such as proteins in food. Some proteins trigger allergic reactions while others do not. One theory is that resistance to digestion occurs when largely intact proteins reach the small intestine and the white blood cells involved in immune reactions are activated. The heat of cooking structurally degrades protein molecules, potentially making them less allergenic. Allergic responses can be divided into two phases: an acute response that occurs immediately after exposure to an allergen but may subside and a late-phase reaction prolonging the symptoms of a response and resulting in more tissue damage.

In the early stages of acute allergic reaction, lymphocytes previously sensitized to a specific protein or protein fraction react by quickly producing a particular type of antibody known as secreted IgE (sIgE), which circulates in the blood and binds to IgE-specific receptors on the surface of other kinds of immune cells called mast cells and basophils. Both of these are involved in the acute inflammatory response. Activated mast cells and basophils undergo a process called degranulation, during which they release histamine and other inflammatory chemical mediators (cytokines, interleukins, leukotrienes and prostaglandins) into the surrounding tissue causing several systemic effects, such as vasodilation, mucous secretion, nerve stimulation and smooth-muscle contraction. This results in runny nose, itchiness, shortness of breath and potentially anaphylaxis. Depending on the individual, the allergen and the mode of introduction, the symptoms can be systemwide (classical anaphylaxis) or localized to particular body systems; asthma is localized to the respiratory system, while eczema is localized to the skin.

After the chemical mediators of the acute response subside, late-phase responses can often occur because of the migration of other white blood cells such as neutrophils, lymphocytes, eosinophils and macrophages to the initial reaction sites. This is usually seen 2–24 hours after the original reaction. Cytokines from mast cells may also play a role in the persistence of long-term effects. Late-phase responses seen in asthma are slightly different from those seen in other allergic responses, although they are still caused by release of mediators from eosinophils.

Six major allergenic proteins from cow's milk have been identified: αs1-, αs2-, β-, and κ-casein from casein proteins and α-lactalbumin and β-lactoglobulin from whey proteins. There is some cross-reactivity with soy protein, particularly in non-IgE mediated allergy. Heat can reduce allergenic potential, so dairy ingredients in baked goods may be less likely to trigger a reaction than would milk or cheese. For milk allergy, non-IgE-mediated responses are more common than are IgE-mediated. The former can manifest as atopic dermatitis and gastrointestinal symptoms, especially in infants and young children. Some will display both, so that a child could react to an oral food challenge with respiratory symptoms and hives (skin rash), followed a day or two later with a flareup of atopic dermatitis and gastrointestinal symptoms, including chronic diarrhea, blood in the stools, gastroesophageal reflux disease (GERD), constipation, chronic vomiting and colic.

== Diagnosis ==
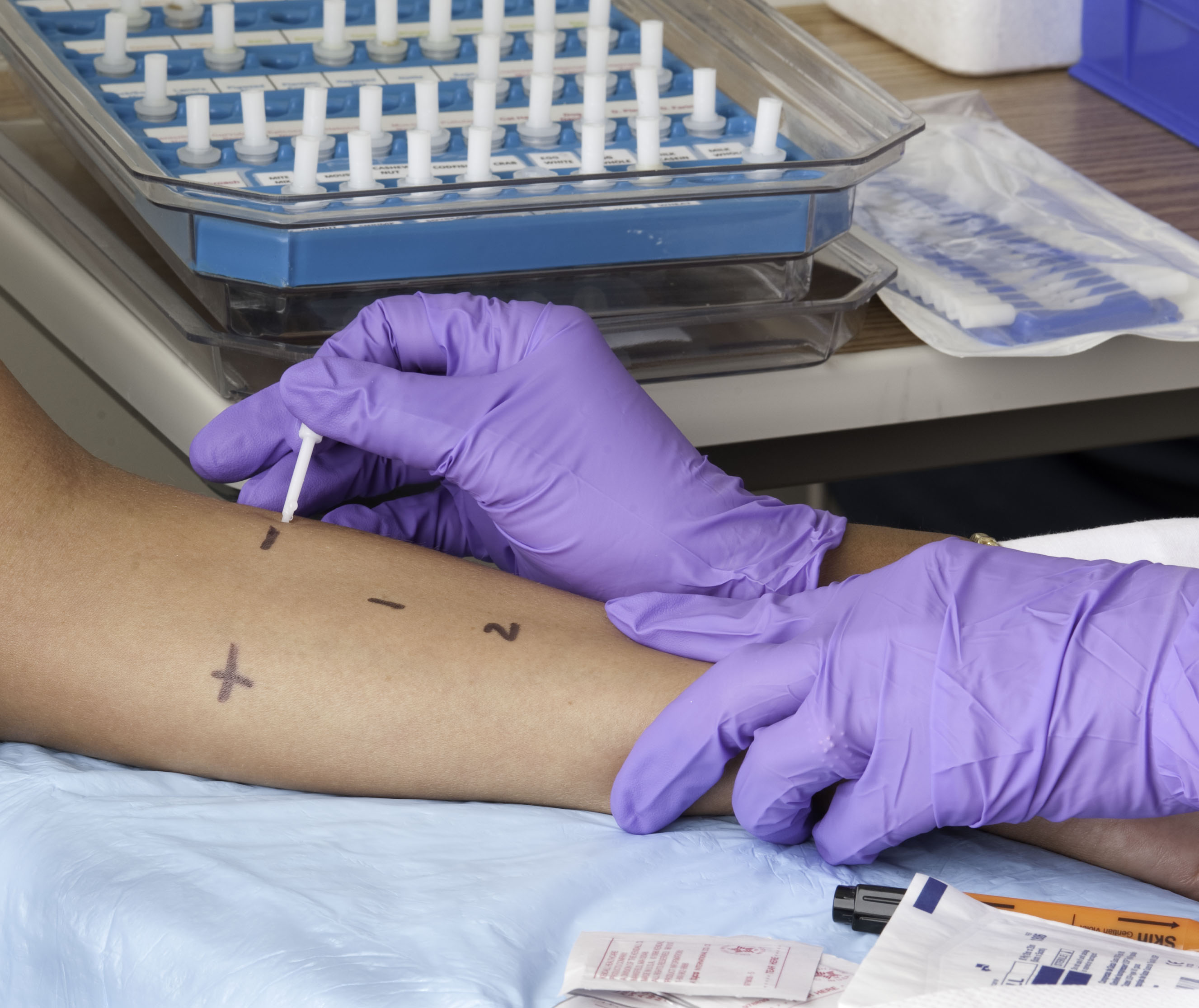
Skin prick testing for allergies. For a positive response, the skin will become red and raised.

Diagnosis of milk allergy is based on the person's history of allergic reactions, skin prick test (SPT), patch test and measurement of milk protein specific serum IgE. A negative IgE test does not rule out non-IgE-mediated allergy, also described as cell-mediated allergy. Confirmation is achieved by performing double-blind, placebo-controlled food challenges conducted by an allergy specialist. SPT and IgE have a sensitivity of around 88% but specificity of 68% and 48% respectively, meaning that these tests will most likely detect a milk sensitivity but may also yield false positive results for other allergens.

Attempts have been made to identify SPT and IgE responses accurate enough to avoid the need for confirmation with an oral food challenge. A systematic review stated that in children younger than two years, cutoffs for specific IgE or SPT seem to be more homogeneous and may be proposed. For older children, the tests were less consistent. The review concluded: "None of the cut-offs proposed in the literature can be used to definitely confirm cow's milk allergy diagnosis, either to fresh pasteurized or to baked milk."

=== Differential diagnosis ===
The symptoms of milk allergy can be confused with other disorders that present similar clinical features, such as lactose intolerance, infectious gastroenteritis, celiac disease, non-celiac gluten sensitivity, inflammatory bowel disease, eosinophilic gastroenteritis and pancreatic insufficiency, among others.

==== Lactose intolerance ====
Hydrolysis of the disaccharide lactose to glucose and galactose

Milk allergy is distinct from lactose intolerance, which is a nonallergic food sensitivity caused by the lack of the enzyme lactase in the small intestines to break lactose down into glucose and galactose. The unabsorbed lactose reaches the large intestine, where resident bacteria use it for fuel, releasing hydrogen, carbon dioxide and methane gases. These gases are the cause of abdominal pain and other symptoms. Lactose intolerance does not cause damage to the gastrointestinal tract. There are four types: primary, secondary, developmental and congenital. Primary lactose intolerance is caused by decreasing levels of lactase brought on by age. Secondary lactose intolerance results from injury to the small intestine, such as from infection, celiac disease, inflammatory bowel disease or other diseases. Developmental lactose intolerance may occur in premature babies and usually improves over a short period of time. Congenital lactose intolerance is an extremely rare genetic disorder in which little or no lactase is produced from birth.

== Prevention ==
Research regarding prevention seeks to determine the possibility of reducing the risk of developing an allergy before it manifests. Reviews have concluded that no strong evidence exists to recommend changes to the diets of pregnant or nursing women as a means of preventing the development of food allergy in their infants. For mothers of infants considered at high risk of developing cow's milk allergy because of a family history, there is some evidence that the nursing mother avoiding allergens may reduce risk of the child developing eczema, but a Cochrane review concluded that more research is needed.

There is some evidence that formula supplement given within the first 24 hours of a babies life in hospital increases the incidence of cow's milk allergy for mothers who then go on to exclusively breast feed.

Guidelines from various government and international organizations recommend that for the lowest allergy risk, infants be exclusively breastfed for four to six months, but there does not appear to be any benefit beyond six months. If a nursing mother decides to start feeding with an infant formula prior to four months, the recommendation is to use a formula containing cow's milk proteins.

A different consideration occurs when a family history exists, either in parents or older siblings, of milk allergy. To avoid formula with intact cow's milk proteins, the product may be substituted with one containing extensively hydrolyzed milk proteins, with a non-dairy formula or with free amino acids. The hydrolyzation process breaks intact proteins into fragments, in theory reducing allergenic potential. In 2016, the U.S. Food and Drug Administration approved a label claim for hydrolyzed whey protein as hypoallergenic. However, a meta-analysis published that same year disputed this claim, concluding that, based on dozens of clinical trials, there was insufficient evidence to support a claim that a partially hydrolyzed formula could reduce the risk of eczema. Soy formula is a common substitution, but infants with milk allergy may also have an allergic response to soy formula. Hydrolyzed rice formula is an option, as are the more expensive amino acid-based formulas.

== Treatment ==
The need for a dairy-free diet should be reevaluated every six months by testing milk-containing products low on the "milk ladder," such as fully cooked foods containing milk in which the milk proteins have been denatured, and ending with fresh cheese and milk. Desensitization via oral immunotherapy is considered experimental.

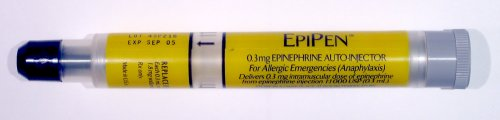
Epinephrine autoinjectors are portable single-dose epinephrine-dispensing devices used to treat anaphylaxis.

Treatment for accidental ingestion of milk products by allergic individuals varies depending on the sensitivity of the person. An antihistamine such as diphenhydramine (Benadryl) may be prescribed. Sometimes prednisone will be prescribed to prevent a possible late-phase type I hypersensitivity reaction. Severe allergic reactions (anaphylaxis) may require treatment with an epinephrine pen, an injection device designed for use by a non-healthcare professional when emergency treatment is warranted. A second dose is required in 16–35% of episodes.

=== Avoiding dairy ===
Most patients with milk allergy find it necessary to strictly avoid any item containing dairy ingredients because the threshold dose capable of provoking an allergic reaction can be quite small, especially in infants. An estimated 5% react to less than 30 milligrams of dairy proteins, and 1% react to less than one milligram. A more recent review calculated that the eliciting threshold dose for an allergic reaction in 1% of people (ED01) with confirmed cow's milk allergy is 0.1 mg of cow's milk protein.

Beyond the obvious ingredients (anything with milk, cheese, cream, curd, butter, ghee or yogurt in the name), in countries where allergen labeling is mandatory, the ingredient list is expected to list all ingredients. Patients are advised to always carefully read food package labels, as sometimes even a familiar brand undergoes an ingredient change. Various non-profit food allergy organizations also recommend carrying a "chef card" or "allergy card" that outline various milk products that an individual avoids to communicate the food allergies to a chef or manager at restaurants. In the U.S., for all foods except meat, poultry, egg-processed products and most alcoholic beverages, if an ingredient is derived from one of the required-label allergens, the product's packaging must display the food name in parentheses or include a statement separate from, but adjacent to, the ingredients list that specifically names each allergen. Dairy-sourced protein ingredients include casein, caseinates, whey and lactalbumin, among others. The U.S. FDA has a recall process for foods that contain undeclared allergenic ingredients. The University of Wisconsin maintains a list of foods that may contain dairy proteins but are not always obvious from the name or type of food. This list contains the following examples:

- Bread, baked goods and desserts
- Caramel and nougat candies
- Cereals, crackers, food bars
- Chewing gum
- Chocolate (both milk chocolate and dark chocolate)
- "Cream of..." soups
- Creamy pasta sauces
- Creamy salad dressings
- Eggnog
- Flavored potato chips
- Hot dogs and lunch meat
- Instant mashed potatoes
- Margarine
- Medical food beverages
- Non-dairy creamer
- Sherbet
- Pudding and custard

There is a distinction between "Contains ___" and "May contain ___." The first is a deliberate addition to the ingredients of a food and is required. The second addresses unintentional possible introduction of ingredients occurring during transportation, storage or at the manufacturing site, and is voluntary; this is known as precautionary allergen labeling.

Milk from other mammalian species such as goats and sheep should not be used as a substitute for cow's milk, as milk proteins from other mammals are often cross-reactive. However, some people with cow's milk allergy can tolerate goat's or sheep's milk. Milk from camels, pigs, reindeer, horses and donkeys may also be tolerated in some cases. Probiotic products have been tested, and some have been found to contain milk proteins that were not always indicated on the labels.

=== Cross-reactivity with soy ===
Infants, either still 100% breastfeeding or on infant formula, and young children may be prone to a combined cow's milk and soy protein allergy, referred to as "milk soy protein intolerance" (MSPI). Some recommend that nursing mothers discontinue consumption of foods containing dairy or soy ingredients. In opposition to this recommendation, a published scientific review stated that there was not yet sufficient evidence in the human trial literature to conclude that maternal dietary food avoidance during lactation would prevent or treat allergic symptoms in breastfed infants.

A review presented information on milk allergy, soy allergy and cross-reactivity between the two. Milk allergy was described as occurring in 2.2% to 2.8% of infants and declining with age. Soy allergy was described as occurring in zero to 0.7% of young children. According to several studies cited in the review, between 10% and 14% of infants and young children with confirmed cow's milk allergy were determined to also be sensitized to soy and in some instances have a clinical reaction after consuming a soy-containing food. The research did not address whether the cause was two separate allergies or a cross-reaction resulting from a similarity in protein structure, as occurs for cow's milk and goat's milk. Recommendations are that infants diagnosed as allergic to cow's milk infant formula should be switched to an extensively hydrolyzed protein formula rather than a soy whole-protein formula.

== Prognosis ==
Milk allergy typically presents in the first year of life. The majority of children outgrow milk allergy by the age of ten. One large clinical trial reported resolutions of 19% by age 4 years, 42% by age 8 years, 64% by age 12 years, and 79% by 16 years. Children are often better able to tolerate milk as an ingredient in baked goods relative to liquid milk. Childhood predictors for adult persistence are anaphylaxis, high milk-specific serum IgE, robust response to the skin prick test and absence of tolerance to milk-containing baked foods. Resolution is more likely if baseline serum IgE is lower or if IgE-mediated allergy is absent, leaving only cell-mediated, non-IgE allergy. People with confirmed cow's milk allergy may also demonstrate an allergic response to beef, especially when cooked rare, because of the presence of bovine serum albumin.

In U.S. government diet and health surveys conducted from 2007 to 2010, 6,189 children ages 2–17 were assessed. For those classified as allergic to cow's milk, mean weight, height and body-mass index were significantly lower than for their non-allergic peers. This was not true for children with other food allergies. Diet assessment showed a significant 23% reduction of calcium intake and near-significant trends for lower vitamin D and total calorie intake.

== Epidemiology ==
Incidence and prevalence are terms commonly used in describing disease epidemiology. Incidence is newly diagnosed cases, which can be expressed as new cases per year per million people. Prevalence is the number of cases alive, which may be expressed in terms of existing cases per million over a period of time. The percentage of babies in developed countries with milk allergy is between 2% and 3%. This estimate is for antibody-based allergy; figures for allergy based on cellular immunity are unknown. The percentage declines as children age. National survey data in the U.S. collected from 2005 to 2006 showed that from age six and older, the percentage with IgE-confirmed milk allergy was less than 0.4%. For all age groups, a review conducted in Europe estimated that 0.6% had milk allergy.

== Regulation ==
Dairy allergy was one of the earliest food allergies to be recorded. An ancient Greek medical text attributed to the doctor Hippocrates (c. 460 – c. 370 BC) notes that some foods are harmful to certain individuals but not others, and "...cheese does not harm all men alike; some can eat their fill of it without the slightest hurt, nay, those it agrees with are wonderfully strengthened thereby. Others come off badly." The text attempts to explain the reaction to the cheese in terms of Hippocratic humorism, stating that some constitutions are naturally "hostile to cheese, and [are] roused and stirred to action under its influence."

With the passage of mandatory labeling laws, food-allergy awareness has increased, with impacts on the quality of life for children, their parents and their immediate caregivers. In the U.S., the Food Allergen Labeling and Consumer Protection Act of 2004 (FALCPA) mandates disclosure of allergen information on food packaging, and many restaurants have added allergen warnings to their menus. School systems maintain protocols regarding foods that cannot be brought into the school. Despite all of these precautions, people with serious allergies must maintain awareness that accidental exposure can occur in other peoples' homes, at school or in restaurants.

=== Regulation of labeling ===
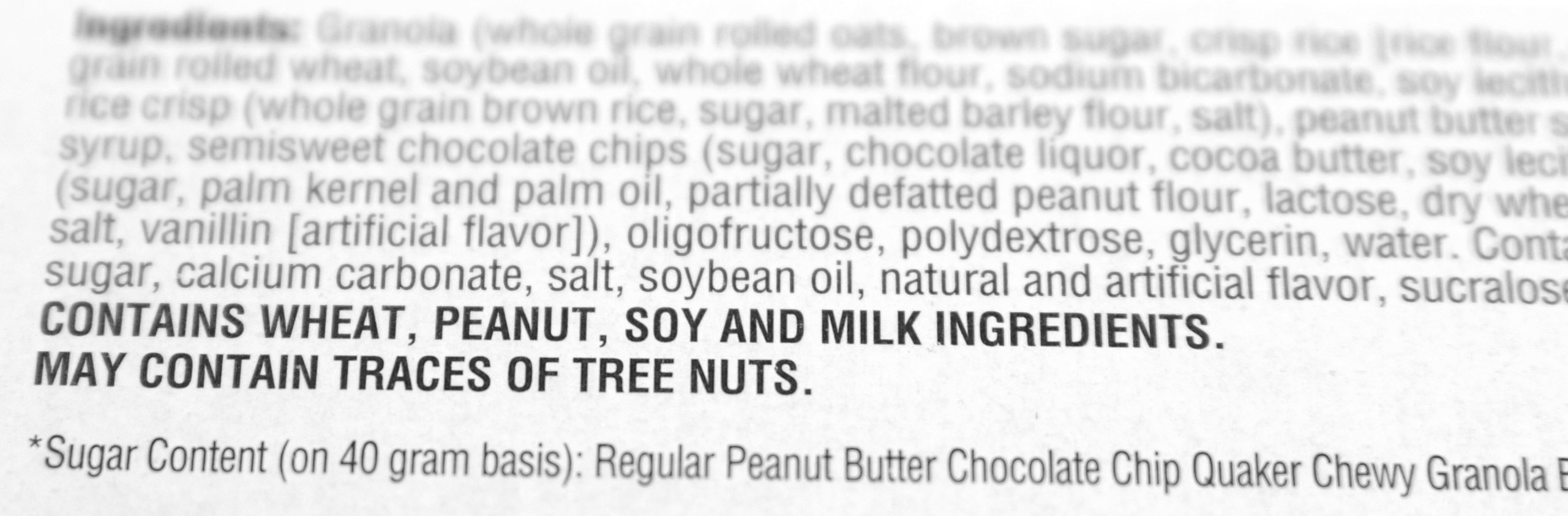
An example of "MAY CONTAIN TRACES OF..." as a means of listing trace amounts of allergens in a food product due to cross-contamination during manufacture

In response to the risk that certain foods pose to those with food allergies, some countries have responded by instituting labeling laws that require food products to clearly inform consumers if they contain major allergens or allergen byproducts among the ingredients intentionally added to foods. However, labeling laws do not mandate the declaration of the presence of trace amounts in the final product as a consequence of cross-contamination, except in Brazil.

==== Ingredients intentionally added ====
In the US, FALCPA requires companies to disclose on the label whether a packaged food product contains a major food allergen added intentionally: cow's milk, peanuts, eggs, shellfish, fish, tree nuts, soy and wheat. This list originated in 1999 from the World Health Organisation Codex Alimentarius Commission. To meet FALCPA labeling requirements, if an ingredient is derived from one of the required-label allergens, then it must either have its "food sourced name" in parentheses, for example "Casein (milk)," or as an alternative, there must be a statement separate but adjacent to the ingredients list: "Contains milk" (and any other of the allergens with mandatory labeling). Dairy food listing is also mandatory in the European Union and more than a dozen other countries.

In 2025, the FDA issued guidance on FALCPA extending labeling requirements to milk from goats, sheep, and other ruminants, in addition to milk from cows. For ruminants other than cows, ingredient labels must include the name of the animal source ("goat milk," for example).

FALCPA applies to packaged foods regulated by the FDA, which does not include poultry, most meats, certain egg products, and most alcoholic beverages. However, some meat, poultry, and egg processed products may contain allergenic ingredients, such as added milk proteins. These products are regulated by the Food Safety and Inspection Service (FSIS), which requires that any ingredient be declared in the labeling only by its common or usual name. Neither the identification of the source of a specific ingredient in a parenthetical statement nor the use of statements to alert for the presence of specific ingredients, like "Contains: milk", are mandatory according to FSIS. FALCPA also does not apply to food prepared in restaurants.

==== Trace amounts as a result of cross-contamination ====
The value of allergen labeling other than for intentional ingredients is controversial. This concerns labeling for ingredients present unintentionally as a consequence of cross-contact or cross-contamination at any point along the food chain (during raw material transportation, storage or handling, due to shared equipment for processing and packaging, etc.). Experts in this field propose that if allergen labeling is to be useful to consumers, and healthcare professionals who advise and treat those consumers, ideally there should be agreement on which foods require labeling, threshold quantities below which labeling may be of no purpose, and validation of allergen detection methods to test and potentially recall foods that were deliberately or inadvertently contaminated.

Labeling regulations have been modified to provide for mandatory labeling of ingredients plus voluntary labeling, termed precautionary allergen labeling (PAL), also known as "may contain" statements, for possible, inadvertent, trace amount, cross-contamination during production PAL labeling can be confusing to consumers, especially as there can be many variations on the wording of the warning. As of 2014, PAL is regulated only in Switzerland, Japan, Argentina, and South Africa. Argentina decided to prohibit precautionary allergen labeling since 2010, and instead puts the onus on the manufacturer to control the manufacturing process and label only those allergenic ingredients known to be in the products. South Africa does not permit the use of PAL, except when manufacturers demonstrate the potential presence of allergen due to cross-contamination through a documented risk assessment despite adherence to Good Manufacturing Practice. In Australia and New Zealand, there is a recommendation that PAL be replaced by guidance from VITAL 2.0 (Vital Incidental Trace Allergen Labelling). A review identified "the eliciting dose for an allergic reaction in 1% of the population" as 0.01 mg for cow's milk. This threshold reference dose (and similar results for egg, peanut and other proteins) will provide food manufacturers with guidance for developing precautionary labelling and give consumers a better idea of what might be accidentally in a food product beyond "may contain." VITAL 2.0 was developed by the Allergen Bureau, a food industry-sponsored, non-government organization. The EU has initiated a process to create labeling regulations for unintentional contamination but it is not expected to be published before 2024.

Lack of compliance with labeling regulations is also a problem. As an example, the FDA documented failure to list milk as an ingredient in dark chocolate bars. The FDA tested 94 dark chocolate bars for the presence of milk. Only six listed milk as an ingredient, but of the remaining 88, the FDA found that 51 of them actually did contain milk proteins. Many of those did have PAL wording such as "may contain dairy." Others claimed to be "dairy free" or "vegan" but still tested positive for cow's milk proteins.

In Brazil, since April 2016, the declaration of the possibility of cross-contamination is mandatory when the product does not intentionally add any allergenic food or its derivatives, but the Good Manufacturing Practices and allergen control measures adopted are not sufficient to prevent the presence of accidental trace amounts. Milk of all species of mammalians is included among these allergenic foods.

== Society and culture ==
Food fear has a significant impact on quality of life. For children with allergies, their quality of life is also affected by the actions of their peers. An increased occurrence of bullying has been observed, which can include threats or deliberate acts of forcing allergic children to contact foods that they must avoid or intentional contamination of allergen-free food.

== Research ==
Desensitization, which is a slow process of consuming tiny amounts of the allergenic protein until the body is able to tolerate more significant exposure, results in reduced symptoms or even remission of the allergy in some people and is being explored for treatment of milk allergy. This is called oral immunotherapy (OIT). Sublingual immunotherapy, in which the allergenic protein is held in the mouth under the tongue, has been approved for grass and ragweed allergies, but not yet for foods. Oral desensitization for cow's milk allergy appears to be relatively safe and may be effective, however further studies are required to understand the overall immune response, and questions remain open about duration of the desensitization.

There is research – not specific to milk allergy – on the use of probiotics, prebiotics and the combination of the two (synbiotics) as a means of treating or preventing infant and child allergies. From reviews, there appears to be a treatment benefit for eczema, but not asthma, wheezing or rhinoconjunctivitis. Several reviews concluded that the evidence is sufficient for it to be recommended in clinical practice.

== See also ==
- Lactose intolerance
- List of allergens (food and non-food)
- Plant milk
