= Lactagen =

Nutritional supplement

Lactagen was a nutritional supplement produced by Ritter Pharmaceuticals that claimed to reduce the symptoms of lactose intolerance. In 2011, Ritter Pharmaceuticals ceased sales of Lactagen, and other dietary supplements, in order to pursue FDA approval for a treatment for lactose intolerance.

Symptoms said to be relieved by Lactagen include bloating, gas, diarrhea, and abdominal cramping which are associated with the symptoms of lactose intolerance. Lactagen is a powder ingested with water or juice in increasing amounts for a period of 38 days. The manufacturer claims that the mixture of prebiotics and probiotics will relieve all symptoms permanently for eight out of ten users. Gastroenterologists suggest that Lactagen can relieve symptoms of lactose intolerance, but relief may not be permanent.

Since Lactagen was a natural dietary supplement, it was not regulated by the U.S. Food and Drug Administration. Therefore, claims of effectiveness were not evaluated by the agency, and Ritter Pharmaceuticals can therefore not make any claims that Lactagen cures or prevents any disease.

== History ==
Founder and president of Ritter Pharmaceuticals, Andrew Ritter, suffered from severe lactose intolerance since his early childhood. Medical experts told Ritter there was no treatment available and that he would have to manage suffering from lactose intolerance for the rest of his life. The condition dramatically affected his health and lifestyle, and thus he began a quest to develop a better solution for his condition. In 1997, after years of suffering, Ritter used himself as the first test subject and developed a lactose intolerance treatment as a project for the California State Science Fair.

Thereafter, Ritter assembled a team of leading lactose intolerance and gastrointestinal experts to formulate, develop and test an alternative solution for treating the condition. In 2004, Ritter created Lactagen and began selling it commercially under the company name Ritter Pharmaceuticals, Inc.

After identifying Lactagen, an early-generation product which demonstrated dramatic improvement in lactose intolerance symptoms, the team embarked on a formal FDA-approval clinical development process to establish efficacy and safety to ultimately be able to provide the treatment to the millions of lactose intolerance sufferers worldwide.

The second generation product, called RP-G28, was a first-in-class compound with the potential to become the first FDA-approved drug for the treatment of lactose intolerance. Ritter's pioneering scientific team developed the compound based on the philosophy of microbiome modulation and the ability to improve colon function by selectively increasing the growth of beneficial bacteria in the colonic ecosystem. However, in 2019, a phase 3 trial of RP-G28 missed its primary endpoint. The oligosaccharide microbiome modulator was no better than placebo at reducing lactose intolerance symptoms.

== Lactose intolerance ==
Lactose intolerance (LI) is a widespread condition affecting over one billion people worldwide. Approximately 40 million Americans (or 15% of the US population) suffer from lactose intolerance, with an estimated nine million of those individuals demonstrating moderate and severe symptoms. Lactose intolerance is caused by a lack of the naturally produced enzyme lactase in the stomach. Lactose intolerance is exemplified by the inability to tolerate and fully digest dairy products, such as milk, ice cream, cheese and pizza. Symptoms may include a painful combination of digestive discomfort, including gas, cramping, bloating or diarrhea. According to the American Academy of Pediatrics Committee on Nutrition (2006), "the symptoms of lactose intolerance can lead to significant discomfort, disruption of the quality of life, and loss of school attendance, leisure and sports activities, and work time, all at a cost to individuals, families, and society."

Currently, there is no approved prescription treatment for LI. Most persons with LI avoid ingestion of milk and dairy products, while others substitute non-lactose-containing foods in their diet. However, complete avoidance of lactose-containing foods is difficult to achieve (especially for those with moderate to severe symptoms), and can lead to significant long-term morbidity, i.e., dietary deficiencies of calcium and vitamin D.

At the 2010 National Institute of Health ("NIH") Consensus Development Conference: Lactose Intolerance and Health, the NIH highlighted numerous health risks tied to lactose intolerance, such as: osteoporosis; hypertension; and low bone density. There is substantial evidence indicating that lactose intolerance is a major factor in limiting calcium and nutrient intake in the diet of people who are lactose intolerant. Adequate calcium intake is essential to reducing the risks of osteoporosis and hypertension. In addition, chronic calcium depletion has been linked to increased arterial blood pressure, thereby establishing a relationship between hypertension and a low calcium intake. Moreover, there is evidence of a correlation between calcium intake and both colon and breast cancer.

Over 50% of lactose intolerant patients are very concerned that they may be susceptible to one of these health risks, as a result of their lactose intolerance.

== Clinical data ==
In a clinical study conducted by Ritter Pharmaceuticals medical board member Chris Landon, M.D., Lactagen showed a statistically significant reduction in lactose intolerance symptoms. The results were gathered among sixty-subjects in a double-blind clinical trial at the Ventura County Medical Center in Los Angeles, California. Specifically, 79% of subjects on Lactagen reported a substantial reduction of lactose intolerant symptoms after completion of the 38-day program, while those on a placebo showed little or no reduction in symptoms. The abstract from the study was published in FASEB Journal in 2006.

== Effectiveness ==
At the National Institute of Health Consensus Development Conference on Lactose Intolerance and Health, experts stated that strategies such as colonic adaptation have intriguing preliminary data and may be useful for individuals with lactose intolerance, although additional research needs to be completed in the area.

A study on colonic adaptation, published in the American Journal of Clinical Nutrition, concluded there is colonic adaptation to regular lactose ingestion. This related adaption reduces lactose intolerance symptoms.

In an interview with the Washington Post, gastroenterologist Theodore Bayless of Johns Hopkins School of Medicine suggested that such a course can relieve symptoms of lactose intolerance, but the relief would not be permanent, particularly if the user were to take antibiotics at a later date.
