= Amino acid-based formula =

Hypoallergenic infant milk formula

Amino acid-based formula is a type of infant milk formula made from individual amino acids. It is hypoallergenic and intended for infants with severe allergy to milk and various gastrointestinal conditions, such as food protein-induced enterocolitis syndrome and malabsorption syndromes. It is sometimes referred to as elemental formula but this is considered a misleading name. Issues with the use of amino acid-based formula include its high cost and its unpalatable taste. Intake of amino-acid formula for healthy infants shows no advantage in growth.

== Background ==
Amino acids are the building blocks of protein and together they form the protein requirements in formula needed for growth and development. The amino acids are in the simplest form, making it easy for the body to process and digest. Amino acid-based formula may be considered hypoallergenic since it does not contain peptides that may trigger an immune response.

Because infants and children have different nutritional needs, amino acid-based formulas are typically formulated either for infants 0–1 years of age or for children 1–10 years of age.

== Uses ==
Amino acid-based formulas may be used for those with cow's milk or soy protein allergy. However, most infants with food allergy respond well to extensively hydrolysed formulas, and only few of those with the most severe form of the illness require the use of amino acid-based formulas. It may also be used for other medical conditions requiring an amino acid-based diet, such as short bowel syndrome, and for transition from parenteral to enteral nutrition.

== See also ==
- Milk allergy
- Food allergy
