= Lactose intolerance =

Inability to digest lactose

- Other names: Lactase deficiency, hypolactasia, alactasia
- Lactose is made up of two simple sugars
- Specialty: Gastroenterology
- Symptoms: Abdominal pain, bloating, diarrhea, flatulence, nausea
- Complications: Does not cause damage to the GI tract
- Usual onset: 30–120 minutes after consuming dairy products
- Duration: Lifelong
- Causes: Non-increased ability to digest lactose (genetic, small intestine injury)
- Differential diagnosis: Irritable bowel syndrome, celiac disease, inflammatory bowel disease, milk allergy
- Treatment: Decreasing lactose in the diet, lactase supplements, treat the underlying cause
- Medication: Lactase
- Frequency: ~65% of people worldwide (less common in Northern Europeans)
- Deaths: 0

Lactose intolerance is a lessened ability or a complete inability to digest lactose, a sugar found in dairy products. Humans vary in the amount of lactose they can tolerate before symptoms develop. Symptoms may include abdominal pain, bloating, diarrhea, flatulence, and nausea. These symptoms typically start thirty minutes to two hours after eating or drinking something containing lactose, with the severity typically depending on the amount consumed. Lactose intolerance does not cause damage to the gastrointestinal tract.

Lactose intolerance is due to the lack of the enzyme lactase in the small intestines to break lactose down into glucose and galactose. There are four types: primary, secondary, developmental, and congenital. Primary lactose intolerance occurs as the amount of lactase declines as people grow up. Secondary lactose intolerance is due to injury to the small intestine. Such injury could be the result of infection, celiac disease, inflammatory bowel disease, or other diseases. Developmental lactose intolerance may occur in premature babies and usually improves over a short period of time. Congenital lactose intolerance is an extremely rare genetic disorder in which little or no lactase is made from birth. The reduction of lactase production starts typically in late childhood or early adulthood, and prevalence increases with age.

Diagnosis may be confirmed if symptoms resolve following eliminating lactose from the diet. Other supporting tests include a hydrogen breath test and a stool acidity test. Other conditions that may produce similar symptoms include irritable bowel syndrome, celiac disease, and inflammatory bowel disease. Lactose intolerance is different from a milk allergy. Management is typically by decreasing the amount of lactose in the diet, taking lactase supplements (the amount of supplements should be based on the amount of lactose consumed), or treating the underlying disease. People are typically able to drink at least one cup of milk without developing symptoms, with greater amounts tolerated if drunk with a meal or throughout the day.

Worldwide, around 65% of adults are affected by lactose malabsorption. Other mammals usually lose the ability to digest lactose after weaning. Lactose intolerance is the ancestral state of all humans before the recent evolution of lactase persistence in some populations, which extends lactose tolerance into adulthood. Lactase persistence evolved in several populations independently, probably as an adaptation to the domestication of dairy animals around 10,000 years ago. Today the prevalence of lactose tolerance varies widely between regions and ethnic groups. The ability for adults to digest lactose is most common in people of Northern European descent, and to a lesser extent in some parts of Central Asia, West Asia, and Africa.

Lactose intolerance is most common among people of East Asian descent (with 90% lactose intolerance), people of Jewish descent, people in African and Arab countries, and among some people of Southern European descent. Traditional food cultures reflect local variations in tolerance and historically many societies have adapted to low levels of tolerance by making dairy products that contain less lactose than fresh milk. One ethnographic example of this is kumis, a fermented milk product that contains little to no lactose, which is the main source of dairy nutrition in Mongolia.

The medicalization of lactose intolerance as a disorder has been attributed to biases in research history, since most early studies were conducted amongst populations which are normally tolerant, as well as the cultural and economic importance and impact of milk in countries such as the United States.

== Terminology ==
Lactose intolerance primarily refers to a syndrome with one or more symptoms upon the consumption of food substances containing lactose sugar. Individuals may be lactose intolerant to varying degrees, depending on the severity of these symptoms.

Hypolactasia is the term specifically for the small intestine producing little or no lactase enzyme. If a person with hypolactasia consumes lactose sugar, it results in lactose malabsorption. The digestive system is unable to process the lactose sugar, and the unprocessed sugars in the gut produce the symptoms of lactose intolerance.

Lactose intolerance is not an allergy, because it is not an immune response, but rather a sensitivity to dairy caused by a deficiency of lactase enzyme. Milk allergy, occurring in about 2% of the population, is a separate condition, with distinct symptoms that occur when the presence of milk protein, whey, triggers an immune reaction. A milk allergy most often appears in the first year of life, while lactose intolerance typically appears later in life.

Lauren Ornelas, the founder of Food Empowerment Project, has coined the term lactose normal to replace lactose intolerance, as the latter term suggests that there is something abnormal or medically pathological about it, and originated in a context of cultural bias and failure to recognize the fact that most weaned humans are unable to digest lactose. Some have expressed preference for the term lactose normal.

== Signs and symptoms ==
The principal manifestation of lactose intolerance is an adverse reaction to products containing lactose (primarily milk), including abdominal bloating and cramps, flatulence, diarrhea, nausea, borborygmi, and vomiting (particularly in adolescents). These appear thirty minutes to two hours after consumption. The severity of these signs and symptoms typically increases with the amount of lactose consumed; most lactose-intolerant people can tolerate a certain level of lactose in their diets without ill effects.

Because lactose intolerance is not an allergy, it does not produce allergy symptoms (such as itching, hives, or anaphylaxis).

== Causes ==
Lactose intolerance is a consequence of lactase deficiency, which may be genetic (primary hypolactasia and primary congenital alactasia) or environmentally induced (secondary or acquired hypolactasia). In either case, symptoms are caused by insufficient levels of lactase in the lining of the duodenum. Lactose, a disaccharide molecule found in milk and dairy products, cannot be directly absorbed through the wall of the small intestine into the bloodstream, so, in the absence of lactase, passes intact into the colon. Bacteria in the colon can metabolise lactose, and the resulting fermentation produces copious amounts of gas (a mixture of hydrogen, carbon dioxide, and methane) that causes the various abdominal symptoms. The unabsorbed sugars and fermentation products also raise the osmotic pressure of the colon, causing an increased flow of water into the bowels (diarrhea).

Lactose intolerance in infants (congenital lactase deficiency) is caused by mutations in the LCT gene. The LCT gene provides the instructions for making lactase. Mutations are believed to interfere with the function of lactase, causing affected infants to have a severely impaired ability to digest lactose in breast milk or formula. Lactose intolerance in adulthood is a result of gradually decreasing activity (expression) of the LCT gene after infancy, which occurs in most humans. The specific DNA sequence in the MCM6 gene helps control whether the LCT gene is turned on or off. At least several thousand years ago, some humans developed a mutation in the MCM6 gene that keeps the LCT gene turned on even after breast feeding is stopped. Populations that are lactose intolerant lack this mutation. The LCT and MCM6 genes are both located on the long arm (q) of chromosome 2 in region 21. The locus can be expressed as 2q21. The lactase deficiency also could be linked to certain heritages and varies widely. A 2016 study of over 60,000 participants from 89 countries found regional prevalence of lactose malabsorption was "64% (54–74) in Asia (except Middle East), 47% (33–61) in eastern Europe, Russia, and former Soviet Republics, 38% (CI 18–57) in Latin America, 70% (57–83) in the Middle East, 66% (45–88) in northern Africa, 42% (13–71) in northern America, 45% (19–71) in Oceania, 63% (54–72) in sub-Saharan Africa, and 28% (19–37) in northern, southern and western Europe." According to Johns Hopkins Medicine, in the United States lactose intolerance is more common in Asian Americans, African Americans, Mexican Americans, and Native Americans. Analysis of the DNA of 94 ancient skeletons in Europe and Russia concluded that the mutation for lactose tolerance appeared about 4,300 years ago and spread throughout the European population.

Some human populations have developed lactase persistence, in which lactase production continues into adulthood probably as a response to the benefits of being able to digest milk from farm animals. Some have argued that this links intolerance to natural selection favoring lactase-persistent individuals, but it is also consistent with a physiological response to decrease lactase production when it is not needed in cultures in which dairy products are not an available food source. Although populations in Europe, India, Arabia, and Africa were first thought to have high rates of lactase persistence because of a single mutation, lactase persistence has been traced to a number of mutations that occurred independently. Different alleles for lactase persistence have developed at least three times in East African populations, with persistence extending from 26% in Tanzania to 88% in the Beja pastoralist population in Sudan.

The accumulation of epigenetic factors, primarily DNA methylation, in the extended LCT region, including the gene enhancer located in the MCM6 gene near C/T-13910 SNP, may also contribute to the onset of lactose intolerance in adults. Age-dependent expression of LCT in mice intestinal epithelium has been linked to DNA methylation in the gene enhancer.

Lactose intolerance is classified according to its causes as:

Primary hypolactasia
Primary hypolactasia, or primary lactase deficiency, is genetic, develops in childhood at various ages, and is caused by the absence of a lactase persistence allele. In individuals without the lactase persistence allele, less lactase is produced by the body over time, leading to hypolactasia in adulthood. The frequency of lactase persistence, which allows lactose tolerance, varies enormously worldwide, with the highest prevalence in Northwestern Europe, declines across southern Europe and the Middle East and is low in Asia and most of Africa, although it is common in pastoralist populations from Africa.
Secondary hypolactasia
Secondary hypolactasia or secondary lactase deficiency, also called acquired hypolactasia or acquired lactase deficiency, is caused by an injury to the small intestine. This form of lactose intolerance can occur in both infants and lactase persistent adults and is generally reversible. It may be caused by acute gastroenteritis, celiac disease, Crohn's disease, ulcerative colitis, chemotherapy, intestinal parasites (such as giardia), or other environmental causes.
Primary congenital alactasia
Primary congenital alactasia, also called congenital lactase deficiency, is an extremely rare, autosomal recessive enzyme defect that prevents lactase expression from birth. People with congenital lactase deficiency cannot digest lactose from birth, so cannot digest breast milk. This genetic defect is characterized by a complete lack of lactase (alactasia). About 40 cases have been reported worldwide, mainly limited to Finland. Before the 20th century, babies born with congenital lactase deficiency often did not survive, but death rates decreased with soybean-derived infant formulas and manufactured lactose-free dairy products.

== Diagnosis ==
In order to assess lactose intolerance, intestinal function is challenged by ingesting more dairy products than can be readily digested. Clinical symptoms typically appear within 30 minutes, but may take up to two hours, depending on other foods and activities. Substantial variability in response (symptoms of nausea, cramping, bloating, diarrhea, and flatulence) is to be expected, as the extent and severity of lactose intolerance varies among individuals.

The next step is to determine whether it is due to primary lactase deficiency or an underlying disease that causes secondary lactase deficiency. Physicians should investigate the presence of undiagnosed celiac disease, Crohn's disease, or other enteropathies when secondary lactase deficiency is suspected and infectious gastroenteritis has been ruled out.

Lactose intolerance is distinct from milk allergy, an immune response to cow's milk proteins. They may be distinguished in diagnosis by giving lactose-free milk, producing no symptoms in the case of lactose intolerance, but the same reaction as to normal milk in the presence of a milk allergy. A person can have both conditions. If positive confirmation is necessary, four tests are available.

=== Hydrogen breath test ===
In a hydrogen breath test, the most accurate lactose intolerance test, after an overnight fast, 25 grams of lactose (in a solution with water) are swallowed. If the lactose cannot be digested, enteric bacteria metabolize it and produce hydrogen, which, along with methane, if produced, can be detected on the patient's breath by a clinical gas chromatograph or compact solid-state detector. The test takes about 2.5 hours to complete. If the hydrogen levels in the patient's breath are high, they may have lactose intolerance. This test is not usually done on babies and very young children, because it can cause severe diarrhea.

=== Lactose tolerance test ===
In conjunction, measuring blood glucose level every 10 to 15 minutes after ingestion will show a "flat curve" in individuals with lactose malabsorption, while the lactase persistent will have a significant "top", with a typical elevation of 50% to 100%, within one to two hours. However, due to the need for frequent blood sampling, this approach has been largely replaced by breath testing.

After an overnight fast, blood is drawn and then 50 grams of lactose (in aqueous solution) are swallowed. Blood is then drawn again at the 30-minute, 1-hour, 2-hour, and 3-hour marks. If the lactose cannot be digested, blood glucose levels will rise by less than 20 mg/dl.

=== Stool acidity test ===
This test can be used to diagnose lactose intolerance in infants, for whom other forms of testing are risky or impractical. The infant is given lactose to drink. If the individual is tolerant, the lactose is digested and absorbed in the small intestine; otherwise, it is not digested and absorbed, and it reaches the colon. The bacteria in the colon, mixed with the lactose, cause acidity in stools. Stools passed after the ingestion of the lactose are tested for level of acidity. If the stools are acidic, the infant is intolerant to lactose. Stool pH in lactose intolerance is less than 5.5.

=== Intestinal biopsy ===
An intestinal biopsy must confirm lactase deficiency following discovery of elevated hydrogen in the hydrogen breath test. Modern techniques have enabled a bedside test, identifying presence of lactase enzyme on upper gastrointestinal endoscopy instruments. However, for research applications such as mRNA measurements, a specialist laboratory is required.

=== Stool sugar chromatography ===
While uncommon today, chromatography can be used to separate and identify undigested sugars present in faeces. Similarly to a stool acidity test, stool sugar chromatography is primarily used to find sugar malabsorption in children due to a lack of other available testing avenues. Although lactose may be detected in the faeces of people with lactose intolerance, this test is not considered reliable enough to conclusively diagnose or exclude lactose intolerance.

=== Genetic diagnostic ===
Genetic tests may be useful in assessing whether a person has primary lactose intolerance. Lactase activity persistence in adults is associated with two polymorphisms: C/T 13910 and G/A 22018 located in the MCM6 gene. These polymorphisms may be detected by molecular biology techniques at the DNA extracted from blood or saliva samples; genetic kits specific for this diagnosis are available. The procedure consists of extracting and amplifying DNA from the sample, following with a hybridation protocol in a strip. Colored bands are obtained as result, and depending on the different combinations, it would be possible to determine whether the patient is lactose intolerant. This test allows a noninvasive definitive diagnostic.

== Management ==
When lactose intolerance is due to secondary lactase deficiency, treatment of the underlying disease may allow lactase activity to return to normal levels. In people with celiac disease, lactose intolerance normally reverts or improves several months after starting a gluten-free diet, but temporary dietary restriction of lactose may be needed.

People with primary lactase deficiency cannot modify their body's ability to produce lactase. In societies where lactose intolerance is the norm, it is not considered a condition that requires treatment. However, where dairy is a larger component of the normal diet, a number of efforts may be useful. There are four general principles in dealing with lactose intolerance: avoidance of dietary lactose, substitution to maintain nutrient intake, regulation of calcium intake, and use of enzyme substitute. Regular consumption of dairy food by lactase deficient individuals may also reduce symptoms of intolerance by promoting colonic bacteria adaptation.

=== Dietary avoidance ===
The primary way of managing the symptoms of lactose intolerance is to limit the intake of lactose to a level that can be tolerated. Lactase deficient individuals vary in the amount of lactose they can tolerate, and some report that their tolerance varies over time, depending on health status and pregnancy. However, as a rule of thumb, people with primary lactase deficiency and no small intestine injury are usually able to consume at least 12 grams of lactose per sitting without symptoms, or with only mild symptoms, with greater amounts tolerated if consumed with a meal or throughout the day.

Typical lactose levels in dairy products
Dairy product	Serving size	Lactose content	Fraction
Milk, regular	250 ml(g)	12 g	4.8%
Milk, reduced fat	250 ml(g)	13 g	5.2%
Yogurt, plain, regular	200 g	9 g	4.5%
Yogurt, plain, low-fat	200 g	12 g	6.0%
Cheddar cheese	30 g	0.02 g	0.07%
Cottage cheese	30 g	0.1 g	0.33%
Butter	5 g	0.03 g	0.6%
Ice cream	50 g	3 g	6.0%

Lactose is found primarily in dairy products, which vary in the amount of lactose they contain:

- Milk – unprocessed cow's milk is about 4.7% lactose; goat's milk 4.7%; sheep's milk 4.7%; buffalo milk 4.86%; and yak milk 4.93%.
- Sour cream and buttermilk – if made in the traditional way, this may be tolerable, but most modern brands add milk solids.
- Yogurt – lactobacilli used in the production of yogurt metabolize lactose to varying degrees, depending on the type of yogurt. Some bacteria found in yogurt also produce their own lactase, which facilitates digestion in the intestines of lactose intolerant individuals.
- Cheese – The curdling of cheese concentrates most of the lactose from milk into the whey: fresh cottage cheese contains 7% of the lactose found in an equivalent mass of milk. Further fermentation and aging converts the remaining lactose into lactic acid; traditionally made hard cheeses, which have a long ripening period, contain virtually no lactose: cheddar contains less than 1.5% of the lactose found in an equivalent mass of milk. However, manufactured cheeses may be produced using processes that do not have the same lactose-reducing properties.

There used to be a lack of standardization on how lactose is measured and reported in food. The different molecular weights of anhydrous lactose or lactose monohydrate result in up to 5% difference. One source recommends using the "carbohydrates" or "sugars" part of the nutritional label as surrogate for lactose content, but such "lactose by difference" values are not assured to correspond to real lactose content. The stated dairy content of a product also varies according to manufacturing processes and labelling practices, and commercial terminology varies between languages and regions. As a result, absolute figures for the amount of lactose consumed (by weight) may not be very reliable.

Kosher products labeled pareve or fleishig are free of milk. However, if a "D" (for "dairy") is present next to the circled "K", "U", or other hechsher, the food product likely contains milk solids, although it may also simply indicate the product was produced on equipment shared with other products containing milk derivatives.

Lactose is also a commercial food additive used for its texture, flavor, and adhesive qualities. It is found in additives labelled as casein, caseinate, whey, lactoserum, milk solids, modified milk ingredients, etc. As such, lactose is found in foods such as processed meats (sausages/hot dogs, sliced meats, pâtés), gravy stock powder, margarines, sliced breads, breakfast cereals, potato chips, processed foods, medications, prepared meals, meal replacements (powders and bars), protein supplements (powders and bars), and even beers in the milk stout style. Some barbecue sauces and liquid cheeses used in fast-food restaurants may also contain lactose. When dining out, carrying lactose intolerance cards that explain dietary restrictions in the local language can help communicate needs to restaurant staff. Lactose is often used as the primary filler (main ingredient) in most prescription and non-prescription solid pill form medications, though product labeling seldom mentions the presence of 'lactose' or 'milk', and neither do product monograms provided to pharmacists, and most pharmacists are unaware of the very wide scale yet common use of lactose in such medications until they contact the supplier or manufacturer for verification.

=== Milk substitutes ===
Plant-based milks and derivatives such as soy milk, rice milk, almond milk, coconut milk, hazelnut milk, oat milk, hemp milk, macadamia nut milk, and peanut milk are inherently lactose-free. Low-lactose and lactose-free versions of foods are often available to replace dairy-based foods for those with lactose intolerance.

=== Lactase supplements ===
When lactose avoidance is not possible, or on occasions when a person chooses to consume such items, then enzymatic lactase supplements may be used.

Lactase enzymes similar to those produced in the small intestines of humans are produced industrially by fungi of the genus Aspergillus. The enzyme, β-galactosidase, is available in tablet form in a variety of doses, in many countries without a prescription. It functions well only in high-acid environments, such as that found in the human gut due to the addition of gastric juices from the stomach. Unfortunately, too much acid can denature it, so it should not be taken on an empty stomach. Also, the enzyme is ineffective if it does not reach the small intestine by the time the problematic food does. Lactose-sensitive individuals can experiment with both timing and dosage to fit their particular needs.

While essentially the same process as normal intestinal lactose digestion, direct treatment of milk employs a different variety of industrially produced lactase. This enzyme, produced by yeast from the genus Kluyveromyces, takes much longer to act, must be thoroughly mixed throughout the product, and is destroyed by even mildly acidic environments. Its main use is in producing the lactose-free or lactose-reduced dairy products sold in supermarkets.

=== Rehabituation to dairy products ===
Regular consumption of dairy foods containing lactose can promote a colonic bacteria adaptation, enhancing a favorable microbiome, which allows people with primary lactase deficiency to diminish their intolerance and to consume more dairy foods. The way to induce tolerance is based on progressive exposure, consuming smaller amounts frequently, distributed throughout the day. Lactose intolerance can also be managed by ingesting live yogurt cultures containing lactobacilli that are able to digest the lactose in other dairy products.

== Epidemiology ==
An estimate of the percentage of adults that can digest lactose in the indigenous population of the Old World and Oceania

Worldwide, about 80% of people experience some form of lactose intolerance as they age past infancy, but there are significant differences between populations and regions. As few as 5% of northern Europeans are lactose intolerant, while as many as 90% of adults in parts of Asia are lactose intolerant.

In northern European countries, early adoption of dairy farming conferred a selective evolutionary advantage to individuals that could tolerate lactose. This led to higher frequencies of lactose tolerance in these countries. For example, almost 100% of Irish people are predicted to be lactose tolerant. Conversely, regions of the south, such as Africa, did not adopt dairy farming as early and tolerance from milk consumption did not occur the same way as in northern Europe. Lactose intolerance is common among people of Jewish descent, as well as from West Africa, the Arab countries, Greece, and Italy. Different populations will present certain gene constructs depending on the evolutionary and cultural pre-settings of the geographical region.

== History ==
Greater lactose tolerance has come about in two ways. Some populations have developed genetic changes to allow the digestion of lactose: lactase persistence. Other populations developed cooking methods like milk fermentation.

Lactase persistence in humans evolved relatively recently (in the last 10,000 years) among some populations. Around 8,000 years ago in modern-day Turkey, humans became reliant on newly-domesticated animals that could be milked; such as cows, sheep, and goats. This resulted in higher frequency of lactase persistence. Lactase persistence became high in regions such as Europe, Scandinavia, the Middle East and Northwestern India. However, most people worldwide remain lactase non-persistent. Populations that raised animals not used for milk tend to have 90–100 percent of a lactose intolerant rate. For this reason, lactase persistence is of some interest to the fields of anthropology, human genetics, and archaeology, which typically use the genetically derived persistence/non-persistence terminology.

The rise of dairy and producing dairy related products from cow milk alone, varies across different regions of the world, aside from genetic predisposition. The process of turning milk into cheese dates back earlier than 5200 BC.

DNA analysis in February 2012 revealed that Ötzi was lactose intolerant, supporting the theory that lactose intolerance was still common at that time, despite the increasing spread of agriculture and dairying.

Genetic analysis shows lactase persistence has developed several times in different places independently in an example of convergent evolution.

=== History of research ===
It was not until relatively recently that medicine recognised the worldwide prevalence of lactose intolerance and its genetic causes. Its symptoms were described as early as Hippocrates (460–370 BC), but until the 1960s, the prevailing assumption in Western medicine was that tolerance was the norm. Intolerance was explained as the result of a milk allergy, intestinal pathogens, or as being psychosomatic – it being recognised that some cultures did not practice dairying, and people from those cultures often reacted badly to consuming milk. Two reasons have been given for this misconception. One was that early research was conducted solely on European-descended populations, which have an unusually low incidence of lactose intolerance and an extensive cultural history of dairying. As a result, researchers wrongly concluded that tolerance was the global norm. Another reason is that lactose intolerance tends to be under-reported: most lactose-intolerant individuals can tolerate at least some lactose before they show symptoms, and their symptoms differ in severity. The large majority of people are able to digest a small quantity of milk (e.g., the amount used in a cup of tea or coffee) without developing any adverse effects. Fermented dairy products, such as cheese, also contain significantly less lactose than plain milk. Therefore, in societies where tolerance is the norm, many lactose intolerant people who consume only small amounts of dairy, or have only mild symptoms, may be unaware that they cannot digest lactose.

Eventually, in the 1960s, it was recognised that lactose intolerance was correlated with race in the United States. Subsequent research revealed that lactose intolerance was more common globally than tolerance, and that the variation was due to genetic differences, not an adaptation to cultural practices.

== Other animals ==
Most mammals normally cease to produce lactase and become lactose intolerant after weaning. The downregulation of lactase expression in mice could be attributed to the accumulation of DNA methylation in the Lct gene and the adjacent Mcm6 gene.

== See also ==
- Food intolerance
- Gastroenterology
- Glucose-galactose malabsorption
- Gluten intolerance
- Lactase persistence
- Lactagen
- Recent human evolution
- Soy cheese
- Soy milk and plant milk
- Sucrose intolerance
