= Lactase persistence =

Ability to digest milk after infancy

Lactase persistence or lactose tolerance is the continued activity of the lactase enzyme in adulthood, allowing the digestion of lactose in milk. In most mammals, the activity of the enzyme is dramatically reduced after weaning. In some human populations though, lactase persistence has recently evolved as an adaptation to the consumption of nonhuman milk and dairy products beyond infancy. Lactase persistence is very high among northern Europeans. Worldwide, most people are lactase non-persistent, and are affected by varying degrees of lactose intolerance as adults. However, lactase persistence and lactose intolerance can overlap.

== Global distribution of the phenotype ==
Percentage of adults that can digest lactose in the indigenous population of Eurasia, Africa and Oceania.

The distribution of the lactase persistence (LP) phenotype, or the ability to digest lactose into adulthood, is not homogeneous in the world. Lactase persistence frequencies are highly variable. In Europe, the distribution of the lactase persistence phenotype is clinal (geographically variable), with frequencies ranging from 15–54% in the south-east to 89–96% in the north-west. For example, only 17% of Greeks and 14% of Sardinians are predicted to possess this phenotype, while around 80–100% of people in northern and central Europe are predicted to be lactase persistent. Similarly, the frequency of lactase persistence is clinal in India: a 2011 study of 2,284 individuals identified a prevalence of LP in the Ror community, of Haryana, in the North West, of 48.95%, declining to 1.5% in the Andamanese, of the South East, and 0.8% in the Tibeto-Burman communities, of the North East.

High frequencies of lactase persistence are also found in some places in Sub-Saharan Africa and in the Middle East. But the most common situation is intermediate to low lactase persistence: intermediate (11–32%) in Central Asia, low (≤5%) in Native Americans, East Asians, most Chinese populations and some African populations.

In Africa, the distribution of lactase persistence is "patchy": high variations of frequency are observed in neighbouring populations, for example between Beja and Nilotes from Sudan. This makes the study of lactase persistence distribution more difficult. High percentages of lactase persistence phenotype are found in traditionally pastoralist populations like Fulani and Bedouins.

Lactase persistence is prevalent in Nguni and certain other pastoralist populations of South Africa as a result of the dairy they consume in their diet. Lactase persistence amongst Nguni people is, however, less common than in Northern European populations because traditionally, their consumption of dairy came primarily in the form of amasi (known as Maas in Afrikaans), which is lower in lactose than fresh, raw milk as a result of the fermentation process it goes through.

== Genetics ==
Percentage of adults with a known lactase persistence genotype in the indigenous population of the Old World

Multiple studies indicate that the presence of the two phenotypes "lactase persistent" (derived phenotype) and "lactase nonpersistent" (hypolactasia) is genetically programmed, and that lactase persistence is not necessarily conditioned by the consumption of lactose after the suckling period.

The lactase persistent phenotype involves high mRNA expression, high lactase activity, and thus the ability to digest lactose, while the lactase nonpersistent phenotype involves low mRNA expression and low lactase activity. The enzyme lactase is encoded by the gene LCT.

Hypolactasia is known to be recessively and autosomally inherited, which means that individuals with the nonpersistent phenotype are homozygous and received the two copies of a low lactase-activity allele (the ancestral allele) from their parents, who may be homozygous or at least heterozygous for the allele. Only one high-activity allele is required to be lactase persistent. Lactase persistence behaves as a dominant trait because half levels of lactase activity are sufficient to show significant digestion of lactose. Cis-acting transcriptional silence of the lactase gene is responsible for the hypolactasia phenotype. Furthermore, studies show that only eight cases were found where the parents of a child with lactase persistence were both hypolactasic. While a variety of genetic, as well as nutritional, factors determine lactase expression, no evidence has been found for adaptive alteration of lactase expression within an individual in response to changes in lactose consumption levels. The two distinct phenotypes of hypolactasia are: Phenotype I, characterized by reduced synthesis of precursor LPH, and phenotype II, associated with ample precursor synthesis, but reduced conversion of the protein to its mature molecular form. The lactase enzyme has two active sites which break down lactose. The first is at Glu1273 and the second is at Glu1749, which separately break down lactose into two separate kinds of molecules.

At least six mutations (single-nucleotide polymorphisms – SNPs) have been associated with lactase expression. They are all located in a region of the gene MCM6 upstream of LCT. This region is considered as an enhancer region for the transcription of LCT. The first identified genetic variant associated with lactase persistence is C/T*−13910. The ancestral allele is C and the derived allele – associated with lactase persistence – is T. In the same study, another variant was found to also correlate with the phenotype in most of the cases: G*/A-22018.

Other alleles associated with lactase persistence have been identified: G/C*-14010, C/G*-13907, and T/G*-13915. This variant is described as part of a compound allele with T/C*3712 in. These three variants are widespread in some populations. Rare variants were reported in a few studies, like the G/A*14107 in the Xhosa and the Fulani (from Mali); the C/T*13906 in the Fulani (from Mali).

Lactase-persistence alleles vary in their geographic distributions. Within European and populations of European ancestry, they are almost entirely correlated with the presence of the −13,910 C/T variant in the enhancer region of the lactase gene (LCT).

This differs from lactase persistence allelic distributions in the rest of the world, particularly in Africa and in the Middle East, where several alleles coexist.

The T/G*-13915 allele is found mostly in populations from East and North Africa and the Middle East. The allele G/C*-14010 was identified in East Africa. The C/G*13907 allele was described in Sudan and Ethiopia. The "European" allele T*13910 allele is also found in some populations from Africa, including the Fulani (from Mali, Sudan, and Cameroon) and the Khoe from South Africa. This allele has also been found in Central Asia.

It is not known how exactly the different variants described above regulate LCT expression. None of the variants so far identified have been shown to be exclusively causal for lactase persistence, and it is possible that there are more alleles to be discovered. If we focus on the "European variant", the position −13910 has an enhancer function on the lactase promoter (the promoter facilitates the transcription of the LCT gene). T−13910 is a greater enhancer than C−13910, so this variant is thought to be responsible for the differences in lactase expression, although not enough evidence is found to prove that lactase persistence is only caused by C−13910→T−13910.

In addition, it was shown in one study involving a Finnish population that the lactase gene has a higher expression when G−22018 is combined with T-13910.

== Evolutionary advantages ==
Lactase persistence is a textbook example of natural selection in humans: it has been reported to present stronger selection pressure than any other known human gene. However, the specific reasons as to why lactase persistence confers a selective advantage "remain open to speculation".

Several pieces of evidence for positive selection acting at the T*-13910 allele were given: it is located in a stretch of homozygosity of c. 1 Mb; the strength of selection is similar to that estimated for the resistance to malaria. Haplotype inferences were performed on data from Central Asia populations; selection was detected there as well – though less strong than in European populations. Thus, even if T*13910 may not be causative for lactase persistence, it was selected during human evolutionary history.

The other variants were also proved to be under selection. The C*-14010 allele is located on a particularly long stretch of homozygosity (> 2 Mb).

The compound allele G*-13915 and C*-3712 was proved to be located on a long stretch of homozygosity (1.1 Mb to 1.3 Mb).

The ability to digest lactose is not an evolutionary novelty in human populations. Nearly all mammals begin life with the ability to digest lactose. This trait is advantageous during the infant stage, because milk serves as the primary source for nutrition. As weaning occurs, and other foods enter the diet, milk is no longer consumed. As a result, the ability to digest lactose no longer provides a distinct fitness advantage. This is evident in examining the mammalian lactase gene (LCT), whose expression decreases after the weaning stage, resulting in a lowered production of lactase enzymes. When these enzymes are produced in low quantities, lactase non-persistence (LNP) results.

The ability to digest fresh milk through adulthood is genetically coded for by different variants which are located upstream of the LCT gene and which differ among populations. Those variants are found at very high frequencies in some populations and show signatures of selection. There are two notable hypotheses with dissimilar theories which try to explain why lactase persistence phenotype has been positively selected. The first one, known as the cultural-historical hypothesis, states that the main reason for LP is the introduction of dairy-based food products into the diet, while the reverse-cause hypothesis argues that dairy consumption was embraced by the societies which were already high in LP frequency.

=== Cultural adaptation ===
Pastoralist populations often present high levels of lactase persistence. According to one hypothesis, there is a nutritional advantage of being lactase persistent in pastoralist populations, as milk has high calorific and nutritional density. Individuals who expressed lactase-persistent phenotypes would have had a significant nutritional advantage, meaning they would have had less competition for resources by deriving a secondary food source, milk.

Milk as a nutrition source may have been more advantageous than meat, as it can be produced more quickly than meat. Milk is also generally less contaminated than water, which decreases exposure to pathogens or parasites.

By contrast, for societies which did not engage in pastoral behaviors, no selective advantage exists for lactase persistence, and the lactase persistence genotype and phenotype remains rare.

For example, in East Asia, historical sources also attest that the Chinese did not consume milk, whereas the nomads who lived on the northern and western borders did. This reflects modern distributions of intolerance. China is particularly notable as a place of poor tolerance, whereas in Mongolia and the Asian steppes, milk and dairy products are a main nutrition source. However, modern East Asian steppe people mainly consume fermented milk, kumis, which has almost no lactose, as the lactose is almost completely destroyed during the fermentation process, which makes the product safe to drink for anyone who is lactose intolerant.

Two scenarios have been proposed for this hypothesis: either lactase persistence developed and was selected after the onset of pastoralist practices (culture-historical hypothesis); or pastoralism spread only in populations where lactase persistence was already at high frequencies (reverse-cause hypothesis). There are exceptions to the hypothesis like the hunter-gatherers Hadza (Tanzania), who have a prevalence of lactase persistence phenotype of 50%.

=== Benefits of being lactase persistent in adulthood ===
The consumption of lactose has been shown to benefit humans with lactase persistence through adulthood. For example, the 2009 British Women's Heart and Health Study investigated the effects on women's health of the alleles that coded for lactase persistence. Where the C allele indicated lactase nonpersistence and the T allele indicated lactase persistence, the study found that women who were homozygous for the C allele exhibited worse health than women with a C and a T allele and women with two T alleles. Women who were CC reported more hip and wrist fractures, more osteoporosis, and more cataracts than the other groups. They also were on average 4–6 mm shorter than the other women, as well as slightly lighter in weight. In addition, factors such as metabolic traits, socioeconomic status, lifestyle, and fertility were found to be unrelated to the findings, indicating that health improvements for these women were due to dairy products consumption and exhibited lactase persistence.

=== Calcium absorption hypothesis ===
Another possibility is the calcium absorption hypothesis. Lactose favors the intestinal absorption of calcium; it helps maintaining it in a soluble form. This can be advantageous in regions of low sunlight exposure where Vitamin D, necessary for the transport of calcium, is a limiting factor. The lactase persistence gene has been shown to correlate with higher levels of Vitamin D.

The correlation between lactase persistence frequencies and latitude in 33 populations in Europe was found to be positive and significant, while the correlation between lactase persistence and longitude was not, suggesting that high levels of lactose assimilation were indeed useful in areas of low sunlight in northern Europe.

Increased calcium absorption helps to prevent rickets and osteomalacia.

=== Arid climate hypothesis ===
A hypothesis specific to arid climate was proposed: here, milk is not only a source of nutrients, but also a source of fluid, which could be particularly advantageous during epidemics of gastrointestinal diseases like cholera (where water is contaminated). Human populations differ in the prevalence of genotypic lactase persistence, phenotypic lactose tolerance, and habitual milk consumptions. An individual's capacity to absorb milk is widespread under three conditions.

1. Higher latitudes where insufficient ultraviolet-B radiation causes deficiencies of calcium and vitamin D.
2. Arid areas where the fresh water scarcity turns milk into a welcomed source of hydration.
3. Pastoral environments where cattle herding provides abundant milk supplies.

=== Lactase persistence and malaria resistance ===
One study suggested that lactase persistence was selected for parallel to malaria resistance in the Fulani from Mali. Proposed mechanisms include the nutritional advantage of milk, low content of p-aminobenzoic acid compared to non-milk diets, and the intake of immunomodulators contained in milk.

=== Lactase non-persistence in milk reliant populations ===
Although the selective advantages of lactase persistence have been discussed, there have been studies of ethnic groups whose populations, despite relying heavily on milk consumption, currently have a low frequency of lactase persistence. A study of 303 individuals from the Beja tribe and 282 individuals from various Nilotic tribes in Sudan discovered a sharp difference between the distribution of lactase phenotypes of the two populations. Lactase persistence was determined with hydrogen breath tests. The frequency of lactose malabsorbers was 18.4% in members of Beja tribes over the age of 30, and 73.3% in members of Nilotic tribes over the age of 30.

== Evolutionary history ==
According to the gene-culture coevolution hypothesis, the ability to digest lactose into adulthood (lactase persistence) became advantageous to humans after the invention of animal husbandry and the domestication of animal species that could provide a consistent source of milk. Hunter-gatherer populations before the Neolithic Revolution were overwhelmingly lactose intolerant, as are modern hunter-gatherers. Genetic studies suggest that the oldest alleles associated with lactase persistence only reached appreciable levels in human populations in the last 10,000 years. This correlates with the beginning of animal domestication, which occurred during the Neolithic transition. Therefore, lactase persistence is often cited as an example of both recent human evolution and, as lactase persistence is a genetic trait but animal husbandry a cultural trait, gene-culture coevolution in the mutual human-animal symbiosis initiated with the advent of agriculture.

Depending on the populations, one or the other hypothesis for the selective advantage of lactase persistence is more relevant: In Northern Europe, the calcium absorption hypothesis might be one of the factors leading to the strong selection coefficients, whereas in African populations, where vitamin D deficiency is not as much of an issue, the spread of the allele is most closely correlated with the added calories and nutrition from pastoralism.

Several genetic markers for lactase persistence have been identified, and these show that lactase persistence has multiple origins in different parts of the world (i.e. it is an example of convergent evolution). In particular, it has been hypothesized that the T*13910 variant appeared at least twice independently. Indeed, it is observed on two different haplotypes: H98, the more common (among others in the Finnish and in the Fulani); and H8 H12, related to geographically restricted populations. The common version is relatively older. The H98 variant – most common among Europeans – is estimated to have risen to significant frequencies about 7,500 years ago in the central Balkans and Central Europe, a place and time roughly corresponding to the archaeological Linear Pottery culture and Starčevo cultures.

The T*13910 variant is also found in North Africans. Thus it probably originated earlier than 7500 ya, in the Near East, but the earliest farmers did not have high levels of lactase persistence and did not consume significant amounts of unprocessed milk.

Some hypotheses regarding the evolutionary history of lactase persistence in given regions of the world are described below.

=== Europe ===
Concerning Europe, the model proposed for the spread of lactase persistence combines selection and demographic processes. Some studies used modelling approaches to investigate the role of genetic drift. According to some models, the spread of lactase persistence in Europe can be attributed primarily to a form of genetic drift. Evidence can also come from other fields, for example written historical records: Roman authors recorded that the people of northern Europe, particularly Britain and Germany, drank unprocessed milk. This corresponds very closely with modern European distributions of lactose intolerance, where the people of Britain, Germany, and Scandinavia have a high tolerance, and those of southern Europe, especially Italy, have a lower tolerance. The lower tolerance in southern Europe can be explained by genetic drift alone but the higher tolerance in northern Europe may be a result of positive selection. 2017 reports, by 23AndMe, indicated 40.4% of its customers, who self identified as European, carried a single copy of the mutated 13910C/T allele and a further 42% carried two copies of the lactase persistence allele.

A 2015 genome-wide scan for selection using DNA gathered from 230 ancient West Eurasians who lived between 6500 and 300 BCE found that the earliest appearance of the allele responsible for lactase persistence occurred in an individual who lived in central Europe between 2450 and 2140 BCE.

A 2021 archaeogenetics study found that lactase persistence rose swiftly in early Iron Age Britain, a thousand years before it became widespread in mainland Europe, which suggests that milk became a very important foodstuff in Britain at this time.

=== Central Asia ===
In Central Asia, the causal polymorphism for lactase persistence is the same as in Europe (T*13910, rs4988235), suggesting genetic diffusion between the two geographical regions.

It is indicated that the allele responsible for lactase persistence (T*13910) may have arisen in Central Asia, based on the higher frequency of lactase persistence among Kazakhs who have the lowest proportion of "western" gene pool inferred from admixture analysis from autosomal microsatellite data. This, in turn, could also be an indirect genetic proof of early domestication of horses for milk products as recently attested from archaeological remains. In Kazakhs, traditionally herders, lactase persistence frequency is estimated to 25–32%, of which only 40.2% have symptoms and 85–92% of the individuals are carriers of the T*13910 allele.

=== South Asia ===
In South Asia, the dominant causal polymorphism for lactase persistence is the same as in Europe (T*13910, rs4988235), suggesting genetic diffusion between the two geographical regions. A 2012 study, of 2284 individuals across the region, identified an average frequency of 10.3% for the allele, though varying in prevalence from 0.8% among the Tibeto-Burman speakers to 18.4% among Indo-European speakers; the west of India hosting the highest incidents of the derived allele. Additionally approximately 3.4% of the population possessed one of the other known alleles.

=== Africa ===
The situation is more complex in Africa, where all five main lactase persistence variants are found.

The presence of T*13910 alleles among the Khoe pastoralists is ascribed to gene flow from Europe. However, the presence of other alleles signals gene flow from East Africa.

It has been hypothesized that the G*13915 variant dispersed from the Middle East, in association with the domestication of the Arabian camel.

The G-14009 variant is based in Ethiopia.

The G*13907 variant is concentrated among Afroasiatic speakers in Northeast Africa.

The C*14010 allele is today most common among pastoralist groups inhabiting eastern Africa, from where it is thought to have spread along with pastoralism into parts of southern Africa. Ultimately, the C*14010 lactase persistence variant is believed to have arrived from the Sahara in areas that were previously inhabited by Afroasiatic-speaking populations. This was deduced from the existence of animal husbandry- and milking-related loanwords of Afroasiatic origin in various Nilo-Saharan and Niger-Congo languages, as well as from the earliest appearance of processed milk lipids on ceramics which were found at the Tadrart Acacus archaeological site in Libya (radiocarbon-dated to c. 7,500 BP, close to the estimated age of the C*14010 variant).

The evolutionary processes driving the rapid spread of lactase persistence in some populations are not known. Among some populations inhabiting East Africa, lactase persistence has gone from negligible to near-ubiquitous frequencies in just 3000 years, suggesting a very strong selective pressure. Some studies also proposed that selection for lactase persistence is not as strong as supposed (soft selective sweep), and that its strength varies a lot depending on particular environmental conditions. Post animal domestication, individuals gained the ability to tolerate lactose after weaning from infancy. This offered a crucial advantage to humans through natural selection by creating genetic variances.

Neolithic agriculturalists, who may have resided in Northeast Africa and the Near East, may have been the source population for lactase persistence variants, including –13910*T, and may have been subsequently supplanted by later migrations of peoples. The Sub-Saharan West African Fulani, the North African Tuareg, and European agriculturalists, who are descendants of these Neolithic agriculturalists, share the lactase persistence variant –13910*T. While shared by Fulani and Tuareg herders, compared to the Tuareg variant, the Fulani variant of –13910*T has undergone a longer period of haplotype differentiation. The Fulani lactase persistence variant –13910*T may have spread, along with cattle pastoralism, between 9686 BP and 7534 BP, possibly around 8500 BP; corroborating this timeframe for the Fulani, by at least 7500 BP, there is evidence of herders engaging in the act of milking in the Central Sahara.

== Other mammals ==
Lactose malabsorption is typical for adult mammals, and lactase persistence is a phenomenon likely linked to human interactions in the form of dairying. Most mammals lose the ability to digest lactose once they are old enough to find their own source of nourishment away from their mothers. After weaning, or the transition from being milk-fed to consuming other types of food, their ability to produce lactase naturally diminishes as it is no longer needed. For example, in the time a piglet in one study aged from five to 18 days, it lost 67% of its lactose absorption ability. While nearly all humans can normally digest lactose for the first 5 to 7 years of their lives, most mammals stop producing lactase much earlier. Cattle can be weaned from their mothers' milk at 6 months to a year of age. Lambs are regularly weaned around 16 weeks old.

== Confounding factors ==
Some examples exist of factors that can cause the lactase persistence phenotype in the absence of any genetic variant associated with LP. Individuals may lack the alleles for lactase persistence, but still tolerate dairy products in which lactose is broken down by the fermentation process (e.g. cheese, yoghurt). Also, healthy colonic gut bacteria may aid in the breakdown of lactose, allowing those without the genetics for lactase persistence to gain the benefits from milk consumption.

== Lactose tolerance testing ==
A lactose tolerance test may be conducted by asking test subjects to fast overnight, then sampling blood to establish a baseline glucose level. Lactose solution is then given to the subjects to drink, and blood glucose levels are checked at 20 minute intervals for an hour. The subjects who show a substantial rise in their blood glucose level are considered lactose tolerant.

A hydrogen breath test is often used to detect lactose intolerance.
