= Food protein-induced enterocolitis syndrome =

Type of allergic reaction to food

Food protein-induced enterocolitis syndrome (FPIES) is a systemic, non-immunoglobulin E (IgE)-mediated food allergy to a specific trigger within food, most likely food protein. As opposed to the more common IgE food allergy, which presents within seconds with rash, hives, difficulty breathing or anaphylaxis, FPIES presents with a delayed reaction where vomiting is the primary symptom. In its acute form, FPIES presents with vomiting that typically begins 1 to 4 hours after the trigger of food ingestion, alongside paleness of the skin, lethargy, and potentially blood-tinged diarrhea. In the severe form of acute FPIES, continued vomiting may cause severe dehydration or hypotensive shock-like state, requiring hospitalization. In its chronic form, continued exposure to trigger foods results in chronic or episodic vomiting, poor weight gain, failure to thrive, and watery or blood-tinged diarrhea. FPIES can potentially develop at any age, from infancy to adulthood, but most commonly develops within the first few years of life and resolves in early childhood. Atypical FPIES presents with evidence of specific IgE-sensitization via positive specific serum or skin IgE testing to trigger foods. Atypical FPIES may prolong time to disease resolution or increase risk of conversion to IgE-mediated food allergy.

== Epidemiology ==
Historically, symptoms resembling FPIES were first reported in the 1960s, but awareness of the disease was limited for decades after. More recently, awareness has increased with establishment of an ICD-10 code in 2016, and the publication of the first international consensus guidelines for FPIES diagnosis by the American Academy of Allergy, Asthma, and Immunology (AAAAI) in 2017.

To date, various studies have estimated the incidence of FPIES to be between 0.015% and 0.7%. However, establishing the true prevalence of FPIES is difficult because of few population-level (large-scale) studies, the relatively recent establishment of standard diagnostic criteria, and under-diagnosis due to disease rarity and lack of awareness. A 2019 United States of America population-level survey estimated a FPIES prevalence of 0.51% in children. A similar prevalence in children has been found in population-level estimates from Israeli and Spanish studies.

Adult-onset FPIES is more rare and not as well understood at this time. The prevalence is uncertain, but reported cases thus far have been predominantly in females. The median age of onset in reported cases has been between 20 and 40 years of age with 6–8 years of symptoms before diagnosis.

=== Comorbid Atopy ===
Numerous studies have found that children with FPIES have significantly higher rates of atopic conditions such as asthma, atopic dermatitis (eczema), IgE-mediated food allergy, and allergic rhinitis. However, the data does not suggest that a prior history of FPIES puts children at risk of developing these atopic conditions in the future.

== Diagnosis ==
Diagnosis is based on the presence of certain symptoms (see below) and not any laboratory tests, as specific IgE and skin prick tests are typically negative (except in cases of atypical FPIES). Additionally, potential trigger foods may be given in small amounts to patients to see whether a FPIES reaction occurs. Differential diagnoses must also be ruled out (see section below). No laboratory test or procedure is currently recommended for FPIES diagnosis.

The underlying pathophysiology of FPIES is not understood at this time, though it is non-IgE mediated. One study found that in patients with non-IgE mediated food allergy, T helper 2 (Th2) cells lymphoproliferative responses were similar to that of patients with IgE-mediated allergies, suggesting an underlying T-cell mechanism of action. Another study found elevated interleukin-17 (IL-17) markers, elevated innate inflammatory markers, and increased T-cell activation after FPIES reaction.

=== Acute FPIES ===
Per international consensus guidelines published in 2017 by the AAAAI, acute FPIES diagnosis may be established in a patient who meets the following major criterion and at least three minor criteria:

Major criterion: Vomiting approximately 1–4 hours following oral consumption of a suspected trigger food, without signs of classic IgE-mediated skin or respiratory allergic symptoms (i.e., hives, itchy skin, stridor, wheezing, tightness in throat).

Minor criteria:

- Second episode of vomiting after eating same food which provoked first episode of vomiting
- Repetitive vomiting 1–4 hours after eating a different food
- Significant lethargy
- Pallor (paleness of skin)
- Required emergency department or urgent care visit due to reaction
- Required intravenous (IV) fluid administration due to reaction
- Diarrhea within 24 hours of consuming trigger (may or may not be bloody)
- Hypotension
- Hypothermia

Current acute FPIES guidelines further divide acute FPIES reactions into mild to moderate and severe disease presentation. Mild to moderate disease typically presents with 1-3 episodes of vomiting around 1–4 hours after trigger ingestion, reduced activity level, pallor, which usually self-resolves without medical intervention, or mild diarrhea. Severe disease typically presents with 4+ episodes of bilious or projectile vomiting within 1–4 hours, along with possible hypotension, shock, severe dehydration, diarrhea, lethargy, hypothermia, abdominal distension, or need for IV rehydration. Laboratory studies in more severe cases might reveal hypoalbuminemia, anemia, eosinophilia, and elevated white blood cell count with a left shift.

Atypical FPIES has all the same symptoms as FPIES, but laboratory tests will show some IgE reaction to the trigger food, with IgE presenting either via blood testing or skin prick testing. This does not mean that atypical FPIES is controlled by IgE. Current studies suggest that children with atypical FPIES take longer to grow out of the condition than children with 'typical' FPIES. It is also possible that atypical FPIES may later transform into an IgE allergy.

Adult-onset FPIES may present differently: based on limited data, adults most commonly present with severe cramping and abdominal pain hours after trigger food ingestion; vomiting is only present in around 60% of cases. Nausea and diarrhea may also be present, but the pattern of symptoms varies. Adult-onset FPIES is not recognized under the 2017 AAAAI consensus guidelines, which may lead to misdiagnosis or under-diagnosis.

=== Chronic FPIES ===
Per current guidelines, chronic FPIES with more frequent exposure to trigger foods (typically either milk or soy in baby formula) has a severe presentation: progressive vomiting with diarrhea, which may result in dehydration, metabolic acidosis, failure to thrive, or hospitalization. Less frequent exposure to trigger foods may present with mild, intermittent vomiting, diarrhea, or poor weight gain, but without dehydration or hypotension. Crucially, chronic FPIES is confirmed by the cessation of symptoms within days of removing suspected trigger foods from the diet; additionally, re-introduction of trigger food at a later date will result in an acute FPIES reaction.

=== Differential Diagnosis ===
FPIES can be distinguished from IgE-mediated food allergy (the most common type of food allergy) by both timing and symptoms. IgE-mediated allergic reactions occur within seconds to minutes of food ingestion, whereas FPIES is a delayed reaction which presents at a minimum 30–60 minutes after ingestion. Whereas IgE-mediated reactions may present with an itchy rash, hives, wheezing, difficulty breathing, or anaphylaxis, these symptoms do not present in FPIES.

Other differential diagnoses for FPIES include infectious gastroenteritis, celiac disease, inflammatory bowel disease, necrotizing enterocolitis, food protein-induced enteropathy, food protein-induced proctocolitis, and eosinophilic gastroenteritis, among others.

Of note, some data indicates that current consensus diagnostic guidelines may under-diagnose in certain cases; one study found that up to 1/4 of patients who presented with a high clinical suspicion of FPIES in a multi-center cohort study in Spain did not meet the 2017 international consensus guidelines, which may suggest a different FPIES presentation depending on geographic location, or varying severity of FPIES.

== Management ==
=== Trigger Avoidance ===
There is currently no treatment for FPIES except avoidance of known trigger foods. The most common FPIES triggers across most published studies have been cow's milk, soy, and grains (especially oats and rice). However, reactions are possible to a number of solid foods, such as eggs, fish, shellfish, meats, peanut, tree nuts, sweet potatoes, and fruits (i.e., banana, avocado, etc.). The list of potential food triggers is varied and can be somewhat region-specific; for example, studies in Spain report higher rates of seafood FPIES. There are also cases of FPIES being transmitted through breast milk in rare occasions.

At present, the only way to know whether an FPIES allergy has definitely resolved is to give the trigger food and observe whether a reaction occurs. This is called an oral food challenge (OFC) and is often done in an outpatient clinic setting to quickly control any symptoms. Current guidelines from the AAAAI in 2020 suggest giving 0.06 to 0.6 grams of food protein per kilogram of patient body weight, with larger amounts given to older children. However, there are still differences among allergists in their method of OFC.

=== Management of FPIES reaction ===
During an acute FPIES episode, if symptoms are mild (1-2 vomiting episodes), ondansetron or infacol may be given to control vomiting in children over 6 months of age, along with oral rehydration. If vomiting persists or if a child has more severe symptoms (i.e., lethargy, pallor, hypotonia), then the child should be taken to an emergency room or hospital for intramuscular or IV ondansetron with IV rehydration. The use of epinephrine or antihistamines is not recommended, as FPIES is not an IgE-mediated reaction.

Chronic FPIES reactions may present with more severe dehydration, hypotension, metabolic acidosis, or failure to thrive, which require hospitalization for IV rehydration and nutritional management.

=== Prognosis ===
Data regarding time to FPIES resolution varies significantly, and appears to depend on factors such as the specific food trigger and whether it is atypical FPIES. On balance, available data suggests that the majority of FPIES cases caused by common trigger foods (cow's milk, rice, oat, soy) resolve by age 5, if not sooner.

The impact of FPIES may also have significant psychological and social burdens on the family of those afflicted by this syndrome. Parents of kids with FPIES report more stress, worry, anxiety, and reduced self-efficacy, which negatively affects their healthcare-related quality of life.
