= Lactase =

Milk-sugar digesting enzyme

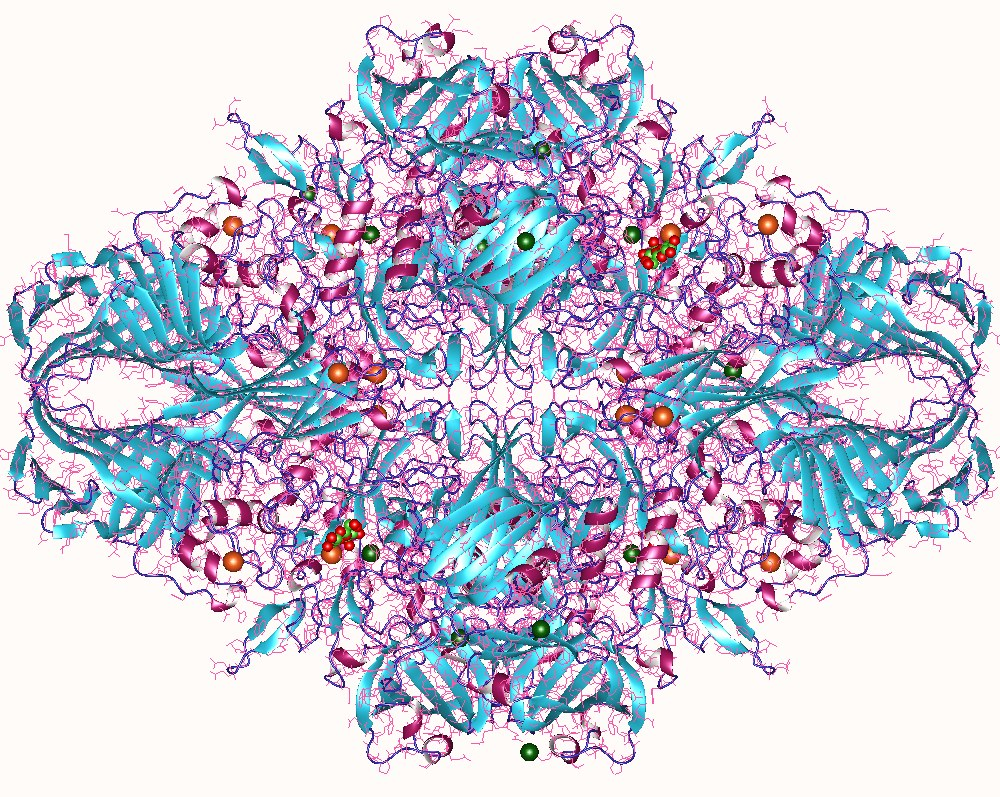
- E. coli lactase tetramer. PDB: 1JYN

Identifiers
- EC no.: 3.2.1.108
- CAS no.: 9031-11-2

Databases
- BRENDA: enzyme data
- ExPASy: NiceZyme view
- KEGG: enzyme entry
- MetaCyc: metabolic pathway
- Rhea: reactions
- PDB structures: RCSB PDB PDBe PDBsum
- Gene Ontology: AmiGO / QuickGO
Search
- PMC: articles
- PubMed: articles
- NCBI: proteins

LCT

Identifiers
- Aliases: LCT, LAC, LPH, LPH1, lactase
- External IDs: OMIM: 603202; MGI: 104576; GeneCards: LCT
Enzyme activity
EC #	BRENDA	ExPASy	KEGG	MetaCyc
3.2.1.62	↗	↗	↗	↗
3.2.1.108	↗	↗	↗	↗

Gene location (Human)
Chr.	Chromosome 2 (human)
Band	2q21.3	Start	135,787,850 bp
Band	2q21.3	End	135,837,184 bp

Gene location (Mouse)
Chr.	Chromosome 1 (mouse)
Band	1 E3|1 55.8 cM	Start	128,212,493 bp
Band	1 E3|1 55.8 cM	End	128,256,055 bp
RNA expression pattern
Bgee	Human / Mouse (ortholog); Top expressed in: jejunal mucosa; duodenum; mucosa of ileum; appendix; gonad; lymph node; liver; kidney; blood; hippocampal formation / Top expressed in: duodenum; migratory enteric neural crest cell; epithelium of small intestine; jejunum; intestinal villus; lumbar spinal ganglion; dentate gyrus; Ileal epithelium; sexually immature organism; hippocampus proper; More reference expression data
BioGPS	n/a
Gene ontology
Molecular function	hydrolase activity, hydrolyzing O-glycosyl compounds; hydrolase activity, acting on glycosyl bonds; catalytic activity; glycosylceramidase activity; hydrolase activity; beta-glucosidase activity; lactase activity
Cellular component	integral component of membrane; membrane; plasma membrane; integral component of plasma membrane; apical plasma membrane
Biological process	polysaccharide digestion; metabolism; glycosyl compound metabolic process; carbohydrate metabolic process
Sources:Amigo / QuickGO
Orthologs
Databases	NCBI: entry; OMA: entry
Species	Human	Mouse
Entrez	3938	226413
Ensembl	ENSG00000115850	ENSMUSG00000026354
UniProt	P09848	F8VPT3
RefSeq (mRNA)	NM_002299	NM_001081078
RefSeq (protein)	NP_002290	NP_001074547
Location (UCSC)	Chr 2: 135.79 – 135.84 Mb	Chr 1: 128.21 – 128.26 Mb
PubMed search
- Wikidata
View/Edit Human	View/Edit Mouse

Lactase (EC 3.2.1.108) is an enzyme produced by many organisms and is essential to the complete digestion of whole milk. It breaks down the sugar lactose into its component parts, galactose and glucose, simple sugars that can be absorbed into the bloodstream through an animal's intestines. A lactase is a type of β-galactosidase because it breaks down the β-glycosidic bond in D-lactose. The chemical reaction it catalyzes is:

lactose
H_{2}O
β-D-galactose
+
D-glucose

The only human gene encoding a lactase is LCT or lactase-phlorizin hydrolase (alternative symbol LPH). LCT has a lactase domain and a phlorizin hydrolase domain. It is encoded on chromosome 2. Lactase is found in the brush border of the small intestine of humans and other mammals. People without the mutation allowing production of functional LCT to continue past infancy may experience the symptoms of lactose intolerance after consuming milk products.

Microbial β-galactosidases that can hydrolyze lactose (i.e. a lactase in the broader sense) (Note: Both the human and fungal "lactases" are β-galactosidases with the ability to hydrolyze lactose. However, the Enzyme Commission classifies the fungal enzymes as β-galactosidases because they hydrolyze a broader set of sugars not limited to lactose and its close analogues.) can be purchased as a food supplement and is added to milk to produce "lactose-free" milk products. This enzyme can directly break down lactose when added to dairy. Some versions can survive passage through the human stomach and break down lactose in any ingested food before it reaches the colon.

== The animal (including human) versions ==
As mentioned above the human lactase is a protein with two β-galactosidase domains. The lactase domain functions as a lactase while the phlorizin hydrolase domain catalyzes the conversion of phlorizin to phloretin and glucose.

=== Structure and biosynthesis ===
Preprolactase, the primary translation product, has a single polypeptide primary structure consisting of 1927 amino acids. It can be divided into five domains: (i) a 19-amino-acid cleaved signal sequence; (ii) a large prosequence domain that is not present in mature lactase; (iii) the mature lactase segment; (iv) a membrane-spanning hydrophobic anchor; and (v) a short hydrophilic carboxyl terminus. The signal sequence is cleaved in the endoplasmic reticulum, and the resulting 215-kDa pro-LPH is sent to the Golgi apparatus, where it is heavily glycosylated and proteolytically processed to its mature form. The prodomain has been shown to act as an intramolecular chaperone in the ER, preventing trypsin cleavage and allowing LPH to adopt the necessary 3-D structure to be transported to the Golgi apparatus.

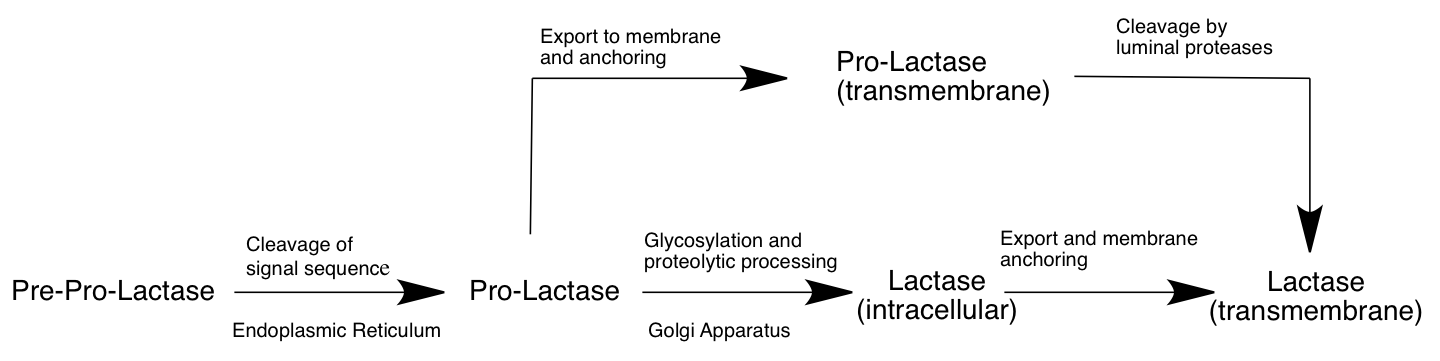

Mature human lactase consists of a single 160-kDa polypeptide chain that localizes to the brush border membrane of intestinal epithelial cells. It is oriented with the N-terminus outside the cell and the C-terminus in the cytosol. LPH contains two catalytic glutamic acid sites. In the human enzyme, the lactase activity has been connected to Glu-1749, while Glu-1273 is the site of phlorizin hydrolase function.

=== Genetic expression and regulation ===
In humans, lactase is encoded by a single genetic locus on chromosome 2. It is expressed exclusively by mammalian small intestine enterocytes and in very low levels in the colon during fetal development. Humans are born with high levels of lactase expression. In most of the world's population, lactase transcription is down-regulated after weaning, resulting in diminished lactase expression in the small intestine, which causes the common symptoms of adult-type hypolactasia, or lactose intolerance. The LCT gene provides the instructions for making lactase. Lactose intolerance in infants (congenital lactase deficiency) is caused by mutations in the LCT gene. Mutations are believed to interfere with the function of lactase, causing affected infants to have a severely impaired ability to digest lactose in breast milk or formula.

Some population segments exhibit lactase persistence resulting from a mutation that is postulated to have occurred 5,000–10,000 years ago, coinciding with the rise of cattle domestication. This mutation has allowed almost half of the world's population to metabolize lactose without symptoms. Studies have linked the occurrence of lactase persistence to two different single-nucleotide polymorphisms about 14 and 22 kilobases upstream of the 5'-end of the LPH gene. Both mutations, C→T at position -13910 and G→ A at position -22018, have been independently linked to lactase persistence.

The lactase promoter is 150 base pairs long and is located upstream of the site of transcription initiation. The sequence is highly conserved in mammals, suggesting that critical cis-transcriptional regulators are located nearby. Cdx-2, HNF-1α, and GATA have been identified as transcription factors. Studies of hypolactasia onset have demonstrated that despite polymorphisms, little difference exists in lactase expression in infants, showing that the mutations become increasingly relevant during development. Developmentally regulated DNA-binding proteins may down-regulate transcription or destabilize mRNA transcripts, causing decreased LPH expression after weaning.

== Mechanism ==
The catalytic mechanism of D-lactose hydrolysis retains the substrate anomeric configuration in the products. While the details of the mechanism are uncertain, the stereochemical retention is achieved via a double displacement reaction. Studies of E. coli lactase have proposed that hydrolysis is initiated when a glutamate nucleophile on the enzyme attacks from the axial side of the galactosyl carbon in the β-glycosidic bond. The removal of the D-glucose leaving group may be facilitated by Mg-dependent acid catalysis. The enzyme is liberated from the α-galactosyl moiety upon equatorial nucleophilic attack by water, which produces D-galactose.

Substrate modification studies have demonstrated that the 3′-OH and 2′-OH moieties on the galactopyranose ring are essential for recognition and hydrolysis by the mammalian lactase. The 3′-hydroxy group is involved in initial binding to the substrate while the 2′- group is not necessary for recognition but needed in subsequent steps. This is demonstrated by the fact that a 2-deoxy analog is an effective competitive inhibitor (K_{i} = 10mM). Elimination of specific hydroxyl groups on the glucopyranose moiety does not eliminate catalysis.

The temperature optimum for human lactase is about 37 °C and the pH optimum is 6.

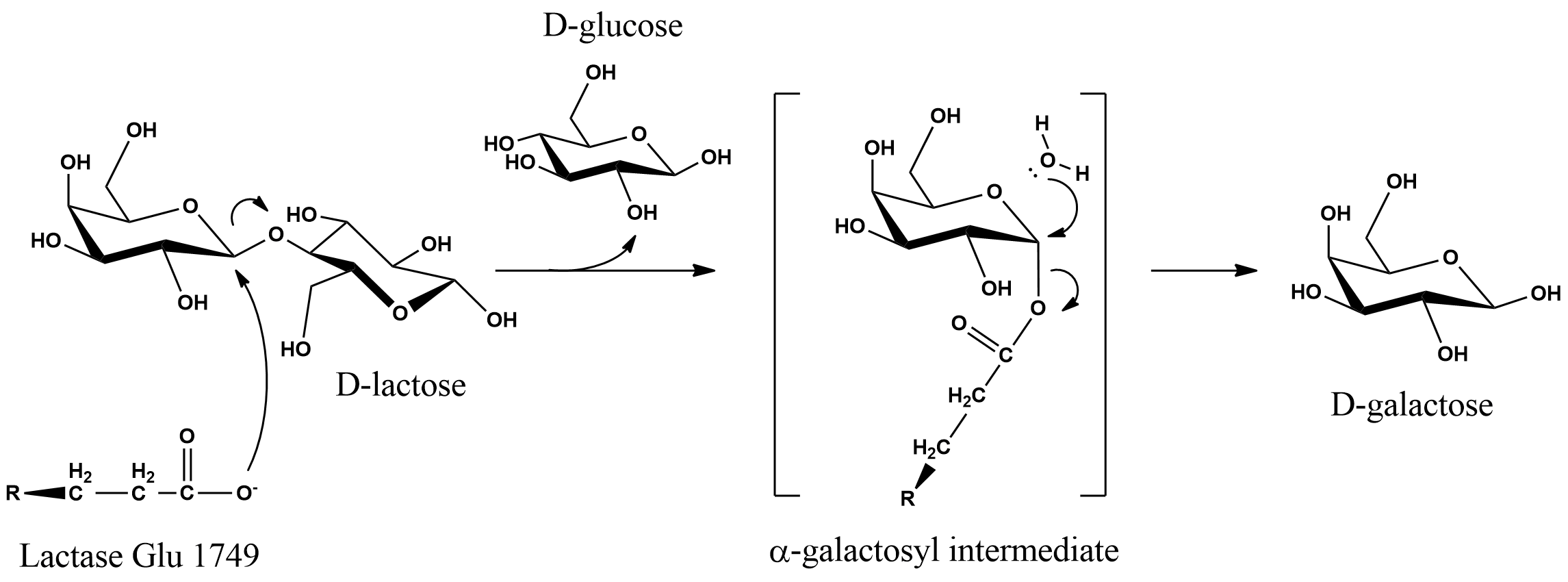

== Non-animal lactases and their uses ==
Lactase produced commercially is extracted both from yeasts such as Kluyveromyces fragilis and Kluyveromyces lactis and from molds, such as Aspergillus niger and Aspergillus oryzae.

As mentioned earlier, lactase is an enzyme that some people are unable to produce in their small intestine. Without lactase, lactose-intolerant people pass the lactose undigested to the colon where bacteria break it down, creating carbon dioxide which leads to bloating and flatulence. The commercial forms of lactase can break down lactose when they are either added to food or put in the human digestive tract.

=== Added to food ===
Lactase is added to dairy, thereby hydrolyzing the lactose in it, leaving it slightly sweet but digestible by everyone.

Technology to produce lactose-free milk, ice cream, and yogurt was developed by the USDA Agricultural Research Service in 1985. Lactase from select species of mold are considered GRAS by the US FDA; as a result, they are allowed to be added to food in limited quantities as a processing aid. This is one of the primary commercial uses of lactase.

=== Ingested ===
Lactase supplements can be used to treat lactose intolerance. The U.S. Food and Drug Administration has not independently evaluated these products, but there is consensus that they do work so long as the stated potency matches what is claimed by the label. They are often sold under the trade name Lactaid.

Commercial lactase is used as a medication for lactose intolerance. Since it is an enzyme, its function can be inhibited by the acidity of the stomach. However, it is packaged in an acid-proof tablet, allowing the enzyme to pass through the stomach intact and remain in the small intestine. In the small intestine it can act on ingested lactose molecules, allowing the body to absorb the digested sugar which would otherwise cause cramping and diarrhea. Since the enzyme is not absorbed, it is excreted.

=== Biotechnology ===
Lactase (technically, β-galactosidase) is also used to screen for blue white colonies in the multiple cloning sites of various plasmid vectors in Escherichia coli or other bacteria. Besides the fungal types of β-galactosidase mentioned above, biotechnology also makes use of the E. coli lacZ β-galactosidase found in the lac operon.

== See also ==
- MCM6
- Lactase persistence
