= Hidaka Site =

Ruins of a Yayoi period settlement in Takasaki, Japan

- 日高遺跡 (Japanese)
- Hidaka Site Hidaka Site (Japan)
- 36°22′05″N 139°01′55″E
- Type: settlement
- Periods: Yayoi period
- Location: Takasaki, Gunma, Japan
- Region: Kantō region

History
- Abandoned: 3rd century AD

Site notes
- Discovered: 1977
- Public access: Yes (No public facilities)

The Hidaka ruins (日高遺跡, Hidaka iseki) is an archaeological site containing the ruins of a Yayoi period settlement located in what is now the Hidaka neighborhood of the city of Takasaki, Gunma Prefecture in the northern Kantō region of Japan. The site was designated a National Historic Site of Japan in 1989, with the area designated expanded in 1998 and again in 2000.

== Overview ==
The Hidaka site is located in the southern end of the Somagahara fluvial fan on the southeastern foothills of Mount Haruna. It was discovered in 1977 during preliminary survey work for the route of the Kan'etsu Expressway. Traces of rice paddy fields with footprints preserved, and the foundations of timber-framed buildings were discovered. Further in the hills, a cemetery was also discovered. The site covers an area of 6.3 hectares. The settlement was surrounded by ring moat measuring 130 meters from east-to-west by 110 meters from north-to-south. Within were a total of 17 pit dwellings. The village site is preserved in good condition as it was covered with a volcanic ash layer from an eruption of Mount Asama, which provides a precise dating to the latter half of the 3rd century AD.

The site, which is now a grassy field, having been backfilled after excavation, is located about 20 minutes on foot from the Ino Station on the JR East Joetsu Line.

== See also ==
- List of Historic Sites of Japan (Gunma)
