= Yaze Site =

Japanese historical site

Yase Site
- 矢瀬遺跡 (Japanese)
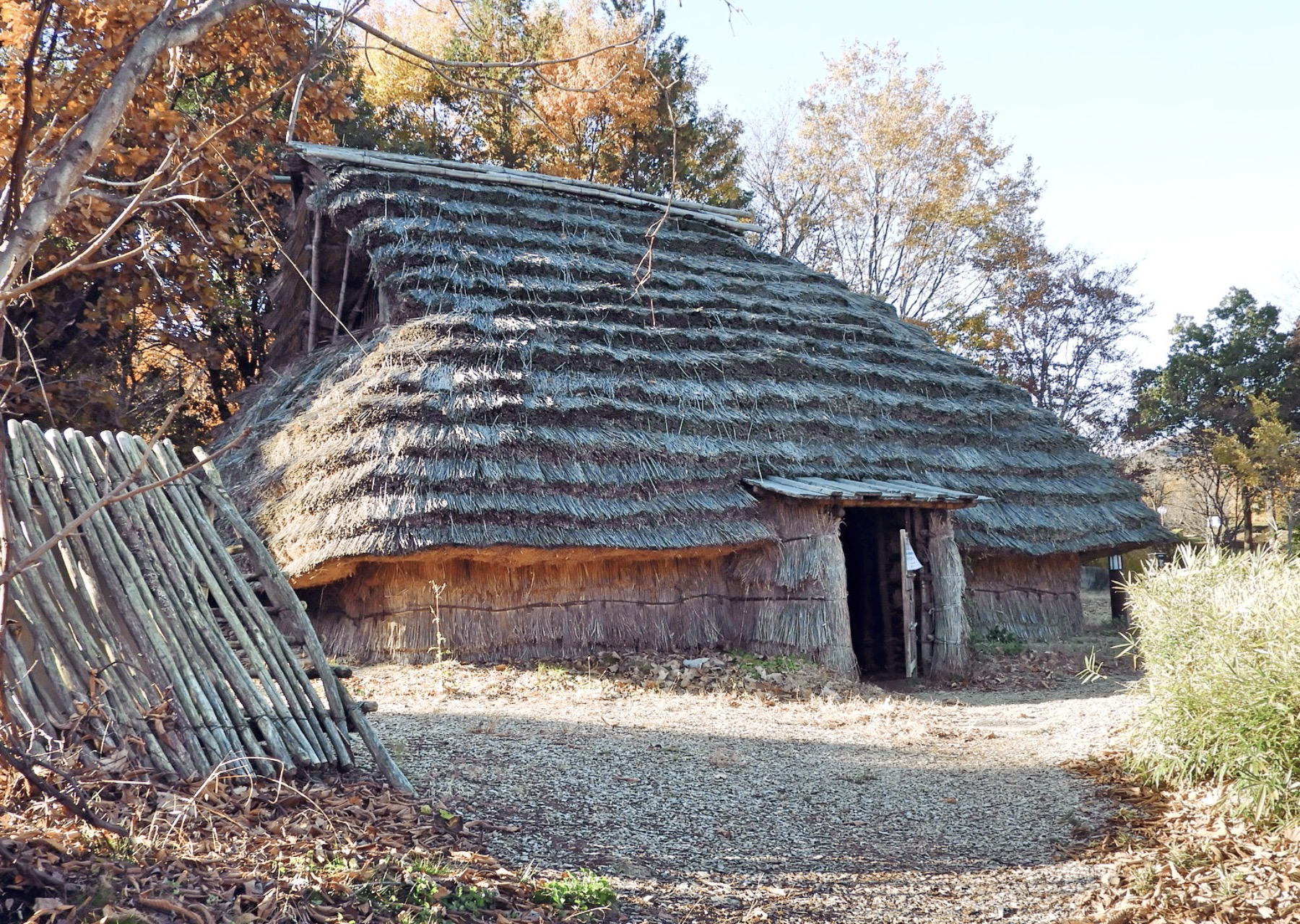
- Yase Site reconstructed pit dwelling

- Yase Site Yaze Site (Japan)
- 36°41′49″N 138°58′56″E
- Type: settlement
- Periods: Jōmon period
- Location: Minakami, Gunma, Japan
- Region: Kantō region

Site notes
- Public access: Yes (archaeological park)

The Yaze ruins (矢瀬遺跡, Yase iseki) is an archaeological site with the ruins of a Jōmon period settlement located in what is now the Tsukiyono neighborhood of the town of Minakami, Gunma Prefecture in the northern Kantō region of Japan. The site was designated a National Historic Site of Japan in 1997.

== Overview ==
The Yaze site is located at the bottom of a river terrace on the right bank of the Tone River. An archaeological excavation conducted in 1992 revealed the ruins of a complete Jōmon period village, including cemeteries, ritual sites, and water areas. The water field was originally dug into a spring, and lined with river stones to form a pond, with a drainage trench and a row of standing stones. Seeds such as acorns, horse chestnuts and walnuts were excavated from the bottom of the pond, indicating that this was used to leach bitter tannins from the seeds to make them more edible. The ritual site was centered on an altar-shaped stone structure that was close to the water, and there was also the foundations for a huge wooden pillar structure whose supporting pillars had a diameter of 80 centimeters and were made from chestnut wood. The graveyard contained more than 100 stone graves, and there were 22 pit dwellings at the site of the village, divided into north and south areas, centering on this very large structure. The site contained a huge amount of excavated relics, including many items of jewelry and ritual objects. The site was dated to 3,500 to 2,300 years ago.

The area is part of a roadside station, Yase Tsukiyono Water Park (矢瀬親水公園, Yaze shinsui kōen), which has a number of faux reconstructions of pit dwellings. Excavated items are displayed at the Minakami Town Tsukiyono Folk History Museum (みなかみ町月夜野郷土歴史資料館, Minakami-machi Tsukiyono kyōdo rekishi shiryōkan; open only on Sundays). The site is located about 10 minutes on foot from Jōmō-Kōgen Station on the JR East Jōetsu Shinkansen.

== See also ==
- List of Historic Sites of Japan (Gunma)
