= Maebashi Futagoyama Kofun =

- 前橋二子山古墳 (Japanese)
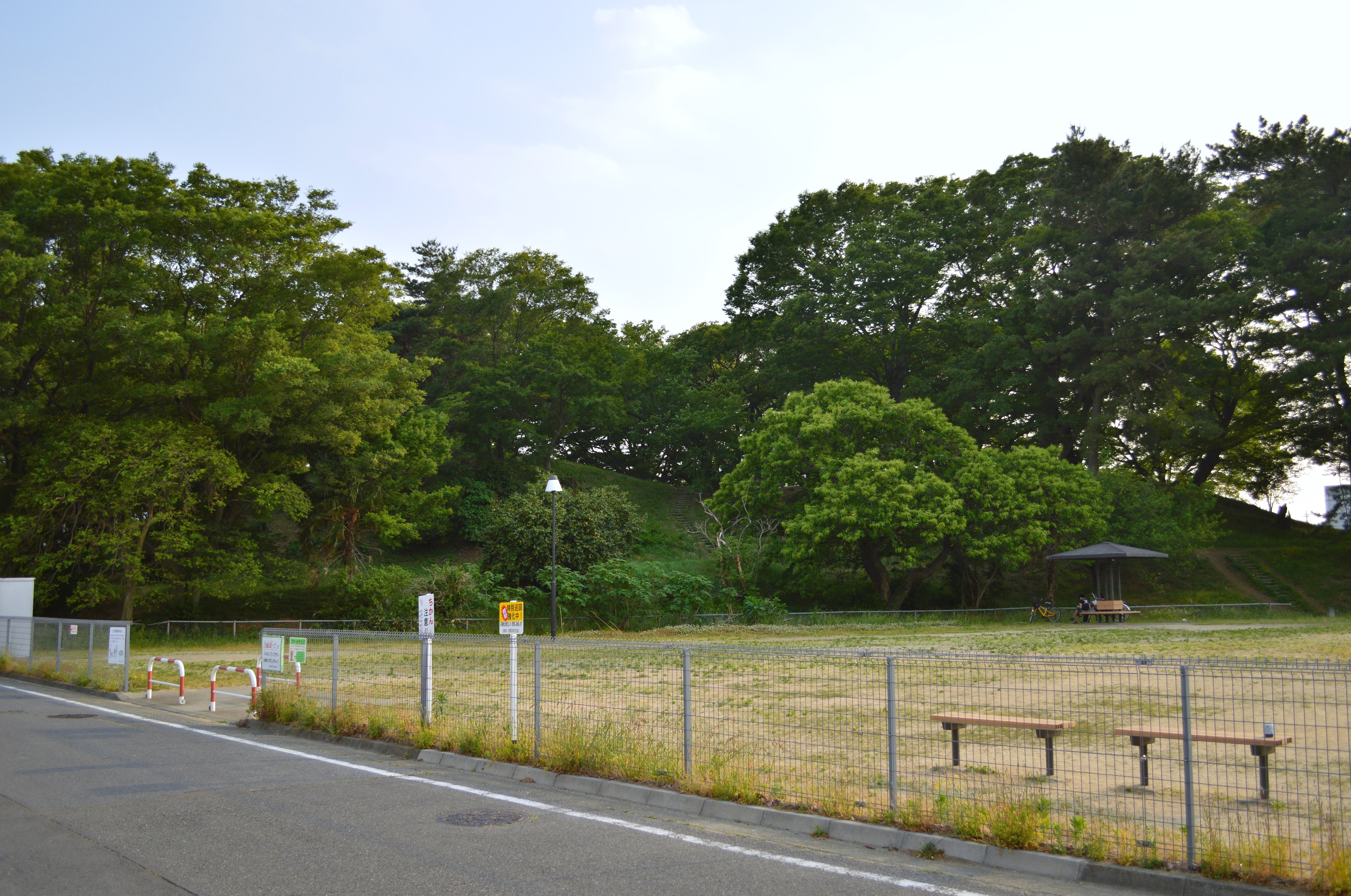
- Maebashi Futagoyama Kofun

- Maebashi Futagoyama Kofun Maebashi Futagoyama Kofun (Japan)
- 36°24′41″N 139°2′5.3″E
- Type: kofun
- Periods: Kofun period
- Location: Maebashi, Gunma, Japan
- Region: Kantō region

History
- Built: late 6th century

Site notes
- Public access: Yes (Park)

Maebashi Futagoyama Kofun (前橋二子山古墳) is a Kofun period burial mound located in the Bunkyocho neighborhood of the city of Maebashi, Gunma Prefecture in the northern Kantō region of Japan. It was designated a National Historic Site of Japan in 1927. It is also sometimes referred to as the Amagawa-Futagoyama Kofun (天川二子山古墳).This tumuli appears in the poem "Futagoyama" by Sakutaro Hagiwara.

== Overview ==
The Maebashi Futagoyama Kofun is located at the eastern edge of the Maebashi Plain, and is one of Asakura / Hirose cluster of kofun tumuli in the area. It has a total length of 104 meters and was built in two tiers, orientated to the northwest. Unusually, the width of the rectangular portion of the mound is larger its length. The surface was originally covered in fukiishi with rows of cylindrical haniwa. One anthropomorphic haniwa from this site is kept at the University of Tokyo. The remains of a 35-meter moat were discovered in an archaeological excavation in 1980 and in 1994, and an analysis of the soil covering the moat found that it contained volcanic ash from an eruption which occurred in the middle of the 6th century AD, indicating that the tumulus was built around the start of the sixth century. Although the detailed structure of the mound has not been investigated yet, it is believed that the burial chamber was opened in antiquity and has since collapsed.

Total length
104 meters
Anterior rectangular portion
76 meters wide x 9.5 meters high, 2-tier
Posterior circular portion
72 meter diameter x 11 meters high, 2-tier

== See also ==
- List of Historic Sites of Japan (Gunma)
