= Nara Kofun Cluster =

Kofun period burial mounds in Numata, Gunma, Japan

Nara Kofun cluster
- 奈良古墳群 (Japanese)
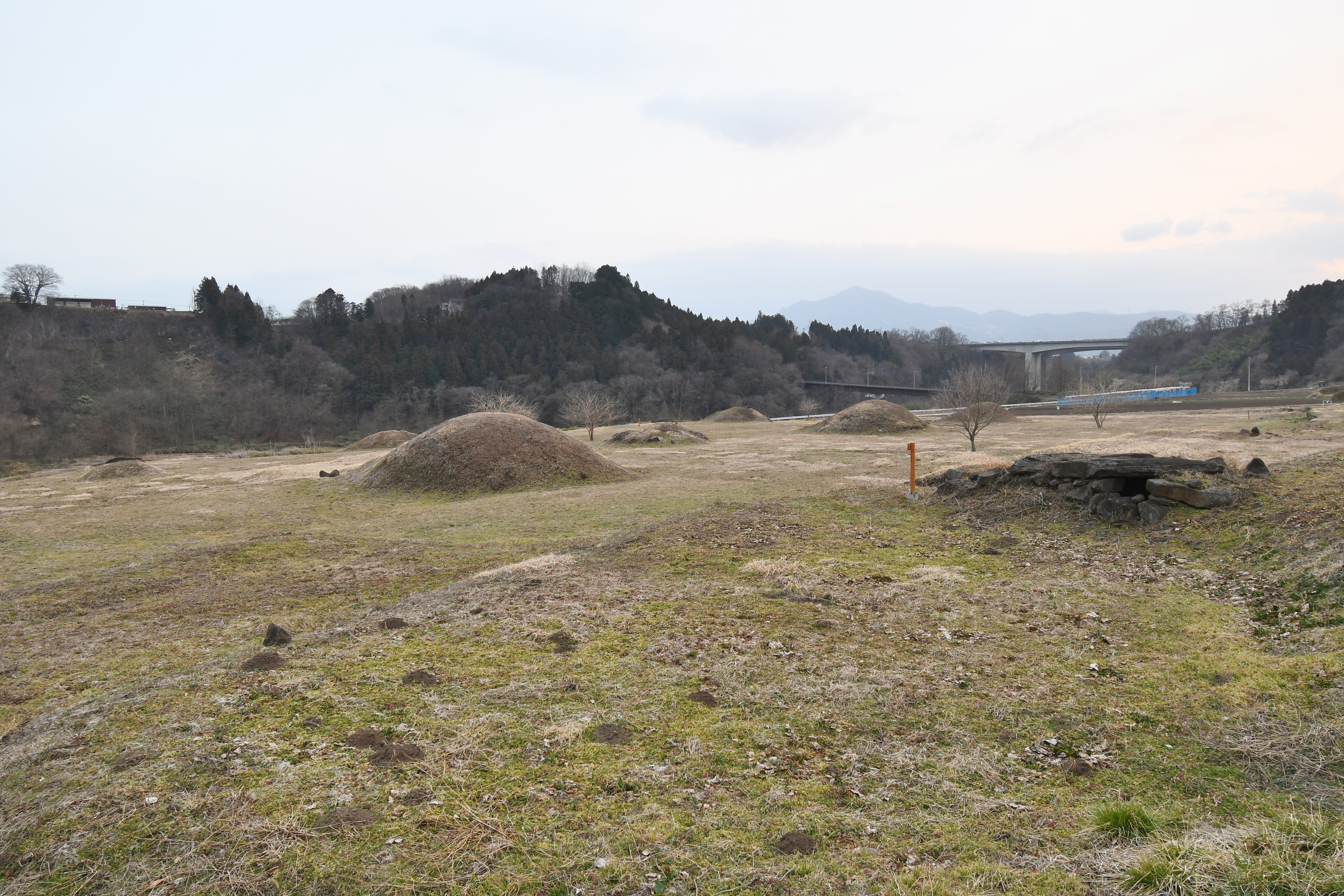
- Nara Kofun cluster Kofun

- Nara Kofun cluster Nara Kofun Cluster (Japan)
- 36°40′0.63″N 139°4′31.63″E
- Type: Kofun cluster
- Periods: Kofun period
- Location: Numata, Gunma, Japan
- Region: Kantō region

History
- Built: 7th century

Site notes
- Public access: Yes (no facilities)
- Gunma Prefecture Historic Site

The Nara Kofun cluster (奈良古墳群) is a group of Kofun period burial mounds, located in the Nara-cho neighborhood of the city of Numata, Gunma in the Kantō region of Japan. The tumulus cluster was designated a Gunma Prefecture Historic Site in 2020, and 280 artifacts recovered from the site were collectively designated a Tangible Cultural Properties of Numata City in 1977.

== Overview ==
This group of burial mounds was constructed on a gently sloping river terrace (approximately 430 meters above sea level) on the north bank of the Usune River in northern Gunma Prefecture. Once known as "Nara's Hundred Mounds," it contained a large number of enpun (円墳)-style round burial mounds, with 59 identified in a 1955 survey. However, many mounds, mainly in the western half, were destroyed during subsequent housing development projects, leaving only 13 remaining today.

All of the burial mounds are small and have horizontal-entry stone burial chambers as burial facilities. In particular, the burial chamber of Tumulus No. 10, located at the eastern end of the tumulus group, has a rare "T"-shaped floor plan, a design unique in Japan. The grave goods unearthed from the tumuli are notable for their abundance of horse trappings. The construction period of this necropolis is estimated to be the 7th century, towards the end of the Kofun period. This suggests that horse breeding, introduced in the southeastern foothills of Mount Haruna in the 5th century (mid-Kofun period), expanded to northern Kōzuke Province by the 7th century. Therefore, this tumulus group is considered important for understanding the expansion of horse demand and the development of the horse breeding system at that time.

The tumulus group area was designated a Gunma Prefecture Historic Site in 2020, and the unearthed artifacts were designated Numata City Important Cultural Properties in 1977.

Nara Kofun Cluster
| Name | Image | Type | Scale | Burial Facility | Burial Chamber | Construction | Remarks |
|---|---|---|---|---|---|---|---|
| Tumulus No. 1 | | Enpun | East-West 12.5m North-South 14.0m | Double-chambered Horizontal Stone Chamber | | Late 7th Century | Sue ware shard, human bones |
| Tumulus No. 2 | | Enpun | 13.0m east-west 11.5m north-south | Double-chambered horizontal stone chamber | | Late 7th century | Sue ware shards |
| Tumulus No. 3 | | Enpun | 14.0m east-west 15.0m north-south | Double-chambered horizontal stone chamber | | Late 7th century | |
| Tumulus No. 4 | | Enpun | 10.5m east-west 12.5m north-south | Double-chambered horizontal stone chamber | | Late 7th Century | |
| Tumulus No. 7 | | Enpun | 14.6m north-south | Double-chambered horizontal stone chamber | | Early 7th century | Largest in the tumulus group |
| Tumulus No. 8 | | Enpun | 6.0m east-west 8.5m north-south | Horizontal stone chamber | | | |
| Tumulus No. 9 | | Enpun | 6.9m east-west 8.4m north-south | Double-chambered horizontal stone chamber | | Early 7th Century | |
| Tumulus No. 10 | | Enpun | East-West 11.0m North-South 12.0m | T-shaped Horizontal Stone Chamber | | Early 7th Century | T-shaped Stone Chamber |
| Tumulus No. 11 | | Enpun | East-West 8.0-10.0m North-South 12.0-13.0m | Double-chambered Horizontal Stone Chamber | | Late 7th Century | |

The tumulus is approximately 15 kilometers southeast of Jōmōkōgen Station on the Hokuriku Shinkansen.

== See also ==
- List of Historic Sites of Japan (Gunma)
