= List of historic sites of Japan (Gunma) =

This list is of the historic sites of Japan located within the Prefecture of Gunma.

== National Historic Sites ==
As of 1 October 2024, fifty-one Sites have been designated as being of national significance (including three *Special Historic Sites).

Site	Municipality	Comments	Image	Coordinates	Type	Ref.
*Kanaizawa Stele 金井沢碑 Kanaizawa hi	Takasaki	Nara period monument; UNESCO Memory of the World Programme	Kanaizawa Stele	36°17′08″N 139°00′58″E	3, 7	521
*Yamanoue Stele and Kofun 山上碑及び古墳 Yamanoue hi oyobi kofun	Takasaki	Asuka period monument; UNESCO Memory of the World Programme	Yamanoue Stele and Kofun	36°16′38″N 139°01′40″E	1, 7	520
*Tago Stele 多胡碑 Tago hi	Takasaki	Nara period monument; UNESCO Memory of the World Programme	Tago Stele	36°15′53″N 138°59′47″E	2, 7	519
Kayano Site 茅野遺跡 Kayano iseki	Shintō	Jōmon period settlement trace	Kayano Site	36°27′16″N 138°58′41″E	1	3236
Watanuki Kannonyama Kofun 綿貫観音山古墳 Watanuki Kannonyama kofun	Takasaki	largest Kofun period tumulus in Gunma	Watanuki Kannonyama Kofun	36°18′27″N 139°04′38″E	1	566
Hachiman Kannonzuka Kofun 八幡観音塚古墳 Hachiman Kannonzuka kofun	Takasaki	Kofun period tumulus	Hachiman Kannonzuka Kofun	36°20′30″N 138°56′27″E	1	558
Iwajuku Site 岩宿遺跡 Iwajuku iseki	Midori	first discovery of Japanese Paleolithic artifacts	Iwajuku Site	36°23′55″N 139°17′15″E	1	568
Former Tomioka Silk Mill 旧富岡製糸場 kyū-Tomioka sesihi-jō	Tomioka	inscribed on the UNESCO World Heritage List as part of the serial nomination Tomioka Silk Mill and Related Sites	Former Tomioka Silk Mill	36°15′21″N 138°53′15″E	6	00003450
Kanayama Castle ruins 金山城跡 Kanayama-jō ato	Ōta	Sengoku period fortification	Kanayama Castle ruins	36°18′59″N 139°22′31″E	2	541
Ushirofutago Kofun and Shō Kofun 後二子古墳ならびに小古墳 Ushirofutago kofun oyobi Shō kofun	Maebashi	Kofun period tumuli	Ushirofutago Kofun and Shō Kofun	36°23′22″N 139°11′39″E	1	529
Arafune-Azumaya Cold Storage Facilities 荒船・東谷風穴蚕種貯蔵所跡 Arafune-Azumaya fūketsu sanshu chozō sho ato	Shimonita, Nakanojō	inscribed on the UNESCO World Heritage List as part of the serial nomination Tomioka Silk Mill and Related Sites	Arafune-Azumaya Cold Storage Facility	36°38′02″N 138°52′39″E	6	00003658
Takayama-sha 高山社跡 Takayama-sha ato	Fujioka	inscribed on the UNESCO World Heritage List as part of the serial nomination Tomioka Silk Mill and Related Sites; protected area extended in 2012	Takayama-sha	36°12′12″N 139°01′54″E	6	00003640
Takayama Hikokurō Former Residence and Memorial Mound 高山彦九郎宅跡 附 遺髪塚 Takayama Hikokurō taku ato tusketari Ihatsuzuka	Ōta	Edo period historian	Takayama Hikokurō Former Residence and Memorial Mound	36°16′35″N 139°20′49″E	7, 8	535
Kuroimine Site 黒井峯遺跡 Kuroimine iseki	Shibukawa	Kofun period settlement	Kuroimine Site	36°31′46″N 139°00′09″E	1	574
Sannō temple ruins 山王廃寺跡 Sannō Haiji ato	Maebashi	Asuka period temple ruins	Sannō Haiji Site	36°24′02″N 139°02′39″E	3	534
Nanakoshiyama Kofun 七輿山古墳 Nanakoshiyama kofun	Fujioka	Kofun period tumulus	Nanakoshiyama Kofun	36°15′42″N 139°02′22″E	1	533
Jūsanpōzuka Site 十三宝塚遺跡 Jūsanpōzuka iseki	Isesaki	Nara-Heian period government complex	Jūsanpōzuka Site	36°18′48″N 139°14′13″E	2	572
Nyotaizan Kofun 女体山古墳 Nyotaizan kofun	Ōta	Kofun period tumulus	Nyotaizan Kofun	36°17′31″N 139°23′40″E	1	526
Onna-bori 女堀 Onna-bori	Maebashi, Isesaki	Heian period canal, protected area extended in 1994, again in 1997, and again in 2016		36°22′10″N 139°11′12″E	6	569
Kōzuke Province Sai District Shōsō ruins 上野国佐位郡正倉跡 Kōzuke no kuni Sai-gun shōsō ato	Isesaki	Nara-Heian period government complex		36°18′41″N 139°11′48″E	2	00003857
Kōzuke Province Nitta Gunchō ruins 上野国新田郡庁跡 Kōzuke no kuni Nitta gun-chō ato	Ōta	Nara-Heian period government complex	Kōzuke Province Nitta District Offices Site	36°19′46″N 139°19′55″E	2	00003598
Kōzuke Kokubun-ji ruins 上野国分寺跡 Kōzuke Kokubunji ato	Takasaki, Maebashi	provincial temple of Kōzuke Province	Kōzuke Kokubunji ruins	36°23′40″N 139°01′20″E	3	523
Yuzurihara Stone Age Residence Site 譲原石器時代住居跡 Yuzurihara sekki-jidai jūkyo ato	Fujioka	Jōmon period ruins	Yuzurihara Stone Age Residence Site	36°08′28″N 139°02′25″E	1	559
Nitta Manor Site 新田荘遺跡 Nitta-no-shō iseki	Ōta	sites connected with Nitta shōen	Nitta Manor Site	36°17′50″N 139°20′01″E	6	3268
Minakami Stone Age Residence Site 水上石器時代住居跡 Minakami sekki-jidai jūkyo ato	Minakami	Jōmon period ruins		36°47′35″N 138°58′50″E	1	557
Ikushina Jinja precincts 生品神社境内（新田義貞挙兵伝説地） Ikushina Jinja keidai (Nitta Yoshisada kyohei densetsu chi)	Ōta	where Nitta Yoshisada is said to have raised an army	Ikushina Jinja precincts	36°19′02″N 139°18′25″E	8	540
Saishikada Nakajima Site 西鹿田中島遺跡 Saishikada Nakajima iseki	Midori	Jōmon period settlement ruins		36°24′25″N 139°15′24″E	1	3400
Sengenyama Kofun 浅間山古墳 Sengenyama kofun	Takasaki	Kofun period tumulus	Sengenyama Kofun	36°17′55″N 139°02′03″E	1	524
Maefutago Kofun 前二子古墳 Maefutago kofun	Maebashi	Kofun period tumulus	Maefutago Kofun	36°23′11″N 139°11′46″E	1	527
Ōtsurumaki Kofun 大鶴巻古墳 Ōtsurumaki kofun	Takasaki	Kofun period tumulus	Ōtsurumaki Kofun	36°17′41″N 139°02′19″E	1	525
Takizawa Stone Age Site 瀧沢石器時代遺跡 Takizawa sekki-jidai ato	Shibukawa	Jōmon period ruins	Takizawa Stone Age Site	36°30′48″N 139°02′23″E	1	531
Nakatakase Kannonyama Site 中高瀬観音山遺跡 Nakatakase Kannonyama iseki	Tomioka	Yayoi period settlement ruins		36°14′26″N 138°53′03″E	1	576
Nakafutago Kofun 中二子古墳 Nakafutago kofun	Maebashi	Kofun period tumulus	Nakafutago Kofun	36°23′15″N 139°11′44″E	1	528
Ōta Tenjinyama Kofun 太田天神山古墳 Tenjinyama kofun	Ōta	Kofun period tumulus	Tenjinyama Kofun	36°17′35″N 139°23′34″E	1	554
Tajima Yahei Former Residence 田島弥平旧宅 Tajima Yahei kyū-taku	Isesaki	also UNESCO World Heritage location	Tajima Yahei Former Residence	36°18′41″N 139°11′48″E	4, 6, 8	00003760
Futagoyama 二子山古墳 Futagoyama kofun	Maebashi	Kofun period tumulus	Futagoyama Kofun	36°22′35″N 139°05′20″E	1	532
Hidaka Site 日高遺跡 Hidaka iseki	Takasaki	area extended in 1998 and again in 2000		36°22′05″N 139°01′55″E	1	573
Shiroishi Inariyama Kofun 白石稲荷山古墳 Shiroishi Inariyama kofun	Fujioka	Kofun period tumulus	Shiroishi Inariyama Kofun	36°15′16″N 139°02′25″E	1	575
Hachimanyama Kofun 八幡山古墳 Hachimanyama kofun	Maebashi	Kofun period tumulus	Hachimanyama Kofun	36°22′01″N 139°06′04″E	1	560
Takei temple ruins Pagoda Site 武井廃寺塔跡 Takei Haiji tō ato	Kiryū	Nara period ruins	Takei Haiji Pagoda Site	36°25′26″N 139°14′35″E	3	553
Hodota Kofun Cluster 保渡田古墳群 Hodota kofun-gun	Takasaki	Kofun period tumuli	Hodota Kofun Cluster	36°22′51″N 138°59′09″E	1	570
Kitayatsu Site 北谷遺跡 Kitayatsu iseki	Takasaki	Kofun period settlement ruins		36°23′57″N 139°00′35″E	1	00003451
Hongō Haniwa Kiln Site 本郷埴輪窯跡 Hongō haniwa kama ato	Fujioka	Kofun period kiln ruins	Hongō Haniwa Kiln Site	36°13′46″N 139°04′47″E	6	556
Minowa Castle ruins 箕輪城跡 Minowa-jō ato	Takasaki	Sengoku period castle ruins	Minowa Castle ruins	36°24′14″N 138°57′08″E	2	571
Yaze Site 矢瀬遺跡 Yaze iseki	Minakami	Jōmon period settlement ruins	Yaze Site	36°41′49″N 138°58′56″E	1	577
Yanase Futagozuka Kofun 簗瀬二子塚古墳 Yanase Futagozuka kofun	Annaka	Kofun period tumulus	Yanase Futagozuka Kofun	36°18′38″N 138°51′32″E	1	00004039
Iwabitsu Castle ruins 岩櫃城跡 Iwabitsu-jō ato	Higashiagatsuma	Sengoku period mountain castle	Iwabitsu Castle ruins	36°33′33″N 138°48′14″E	2	00004080
Kōzuke Province Tago District Shōsō ruins 上野国多胡郡正倉跡 Kōzuke no kuni Tago-gun shōsō ato	Takasaki	Nara-Heian period government complex		36°15′41″N 138°59′48″E	2	00004092
Former Shinmachi Spinning Mill 旧新町紡績所 kyū-Shin-machi bōsekijo	Takasaki	also an Important Cultural Property	Former Shinmachi Spinning Mill	36°16′40″N 139°06′02″E	6	00003877
Sōja Kofun Cluster 総社古墳群; Sōja kofungun	Maebashi	includes Futagoyama Kofun (二子山古墳), Hōtōzan Kofun (宝塔山古墳), Jaketsuzan Kofun (蛇穴山古墳), Tōmiyama Kofun (遠見山古墳), and Atagoyama Kofun (愛宕山古墳)		36°24′41″N 139°02′05″E		
Kōzuke Kokubunni-ji ruins 上野国分尼寺跡; Kōzuke Kokubunniji ato	Takasaki	provincial nunnery of Kōzuke Province		36°23′39″N 139°01′42″E		

== Prefectural Historic Sites ==
As of 1 May 2024, eighty-nine Sites have been designated as being of prefectural importance.

Site	Municipality	Comments	Image	Coordinates	Type	Ref.
Futatsuyama Kofun 二ツ山古墳1号墳 二ツ山古墳2号墳; Futatsuyama kofun ichigō fun nigō fun	Ōta	designation comprises two mounds: No.1 and No.2		36°20′10″N 139°19′44″E		for all refs see
Kagamitezuka Kofun 鏡手塚古墳; Kagamitezuka kofun	Maebashi			36°26′08″N 139°12′41″E		
Kabuzuka Yunoiri Kitayama Kofun - Nishiyama Kofun 藪塚湯之入 北山古墳 西山古墳; Yabutsuka yu no nyū Kitayama kofun Nishiyama kofun	Ōta			36°21′44″N 139°19′01″E		
Tsuruyama Kofun 鶴山古墳; Tsuruyama kofun	Ōta			36°19′27″N 139°20′25″E		
Danzuka Kofun 壇塚古墳; Danzuka kofun	Maebashi			36°26′11″N 139°12′38″E		
Kokuzōzuka Kofun 虚空蔵塚古墳; Kokuzōzuka kofun	Shibukawa			36°30′02″N 138°59′43″E		
Takazuka Kofun 高塚古墳; Takazuka kofun	Shintō			36°25′38″N 138°59′39″E		
Shidomezuka (Hitomezuka) しどめ塚（人見塚） Shidomezuka (Hitomezuka)	Takasaki			36°21′39″N 138°56′21″E		
Maebashi Tenjiyama Kofun 前橋天神山古墳; Maebashi Tenjinyama kofun	Maebashi			36°21′54″N 139°06′14″E		
Isezuka Kofun 伊勢塚古墳; Isezuka kofun	Fujioka			36°15′56″N 139°02′16″E		
Horikoshi Kofun 堀越古墳; Horikoshi kofun	Maebashi			36°24′50″N 139°08′55″E		
Tsukamawari Kofun Cluster No.4 Kofun 塚廻古墳群第４号古墳; Tsukamawari kofun-gun yon-gō kofun	Ōta			36°17′07″N 139°25′26″E		
Chōshizuka Kofun 朝子塚古墳; Chōshizuka kofun	Ōta			36°17′07″N 139°25′18″E		
Nakatsuka Kofun 中塚古墳; Nakatsuka kofun	Kiryū			36°25′24″N 139°14′31″E		
Nakanomine Kofun 中ノ峯古墳; Nakanomine kofun	Shibukawa			36°31′55″N 138°59′26″E		
Anrakuji Kofun 安楽寺古墳; Anrakuji kofun	Takasaki			36°17′54″N 139°02′22″E		
Sasamori Kofun 笹森古墳; Sasamori kofun	Kanra			36°15′04″N 138°55′18″E		
Kokaiharamae No.1 Kofun 古海原前１号古墳; Kokaiharamae ichi-gō kofun	Ōizumi			36°13′34″N 139°24′50″E		
Ōjizuka Kofun 皇子塚古墳; Ōjizuka kofun	Fujioka			36°15′34″N 139°02′22″E		
Hirai District No.1 Kofun 平井地区１号古墳; Hirai chiku ichi-gō kofun	Fujioka			36°34′23″N 138°05′58″E		
Mitsuya Kofun 三津屋古墳; Mitsuya kofun	Yoshioka			36°26′06″N 139°01′25″E		
Arato Fujiyama Kofun 荒砥富士山古墳; Arato Fujiyama kofun	Maebashi			36°22′59″N 139°10′41″E		
Gokan No.3 Tumulus 後閑３号墳; Gokan san-gō fun	Annaka			36°19′37″N 138°50′47″E		
Shimomasuda Kamitanaka No.1 Tumulus 下増田上田中１号墳; Shimomasuda Kamitanaka ichi-gō fun	Annaka			36°19′43″N 138°48′45″E		
Nara Kofun Cluster 奈良古墳群; Nara kofun-gun	Numata			36°39′59″N 139°04′21″E		
Minamishimo Kofun Cluster 南下古墳群; Minamishimo kofun-gun	Yoshioka			36°26′23″N 139°00′31″E		
Yamakami Castle ruins 山上城跡; Yamakami-jō ato	Kiryū			36°25′37″N 139°13′41″E		
Zen Castle ruins 膳城跡; Zen-jō ato	Maebashi			36°25′17″N 139°13′24″E		
Nagurumi Castle ruins 名胡桃城址; Nagurumi-jō shi	Minakami			36°40′09″N 138°59′28″E		
Ōgo Castle ruins 大胡城跡; Ōgo-jō ato	Maebashi			36°25′11″N 139°09′35″E		
Hikobe Family Residence Site 彦部氏屋敷; Hikobe-ke no ya ato	Kiryū			36°22′25″N 139°20′54″E		
Nagaisaka Castle ruins 長井坂城跡; Nagaisaka-jō ato	Shōwa			36°35′09″N 139°03′47″E		
Kitaaranami Fort Site 北新波砦跡; Kitaaranami-toride ato	Takasaki			36°21′56″N 138°58′06″E		
Former Obata Domain Matsura Family Residence 旧小幡藩武家屋敷松浦氏屋敷 kyū-Obata-han buke yashiki Matsura-shi yashiki	Kanra			36°13′35″N 138°54′52″E		
Hirai Castle Site and Kanayama Castle Site 平井城・金山城跡; Hirai-jō・Kanayama-jō ato	Fujioka			36°13′09″N 139°01′40″E		
Yuzurihara Stone Age Settlement Site 譲原石器時代聚落跡; Yuzurihara sekki jidai jūraku ato	Fujioka			36°08′36″N 139°02′18″E		
Tsukuriishi Lotus Sutra Memorial Site 造石法華経供養遺跡; Tsukuriishi hoke-kyō kuyō iseki	Kanra			36°15′42″N 138°56′52″E		
Kurabuchi Village Nagai Stone Age Dwelling Site 倉渕村長井石器時代住居跡; Kurabuchi-mura Nagai sekki jidai jūkyo ato	Takasaki			36°27′09″N 138°46′31″E		
Kanbaki Stone Age Dwelling Site 勘場木石器時代住居跡; Kanbaki sekki jidai jūkyo ato	Naganohara			36°33′26″N 138°36′43″E		
Tenmei 3 Mount Asama Eruption Site 天明三年浅間やけ遺跡; Tenmei san-nen Asama yake iseki	Tsumagoi			36°30′58″N 138°32′45″E		
Divorce Temple Mantoku-ji Site 縁切寺満徳寺遺跡; Enkiri-dera Mantokuji iseki	Ōta			36°15′12″N 139°17′03″E		
Aneyama Stonework Kamado 姉山の石組カマド; Aneyama no ishigumi kamado	Higashiagatsuma			36°33′56″N 138°45′38″E		
Azami Jōmon Culture Dwelling Site 阿左美縄文式文化住居跡; Azami jōmon-shiki bunka jūkyo ato	Midori			36°23′08″N 139°18′16″E		
Hitsuishi 櫃石; Hitsuishi	Maebashi			36°29′38″N 139°10′22″E		
Komuro Paved Dwelling Site 小室敷石住居跡; Komuro shikiishi jūkyo ato	Shibukawa			36°29′43″N 139°02′41″E		
Wakatahara Sites 若田原遺跡群; Wakatahara iseki-gun	Takasaki			36°20′57″N 138°56′04″E		
Irino Site 入野遺跡; Irino iseki	Takasaki			36°14′58″N 139°00′10″E		
Nakayama Paved Dwelling Site 中山敷石住居跡; Nakayama shikiishi jūkyo ato	Takayama			36°37′09″N 138°57′54″E		
Nakaōzuka Jōmon Period Paving Remains 中大塚縄文時代敷石遺構; Nakaōzuka Jōmon jidai shikiishi ikō	Fujioka			36°14′58″N 139°02′50″E		
Shibukawa Kanai Ironworking Site 渋川金井製鉄遺跡; Shibukawa Kanai seitetsu iseki	Shibukawa			36°30′33″N 138°59′41″E		
Sendagi Site 千駄木遺跡; Sendagi iseki	Annaka			36°17′31″N 138°40′47″E		
Nashinokidaira Paved Dwelling Site 梨の木平敷石住居跡; Nashinokidaira shikiishi jūkyo ato	Minakami			36°41′40″N 138°58′43″E		
Hakizawa Shimizu Jōmon Period Dwelling Site ハ木沢清水縄文時代住居跡; Hakizawa Shimizu Jōmon jidai jūkyo ato	Shibukawa			36°33′40″N 138°58′16″E		
Kumakura Site 熊倉遺跡; Kumakura iseki	Nakanojō			36°39′32″N 138°35′59″E		
Nakasuji Site 中筋遺跡; Nakasuji iseki	Shibukawa			36°28′48″N 138°59′41″E		
Nakamizo Fukamachi Site 中溝・深町遺跡; Nakamizo・Fukamachi iseki	Ōta			36°18′24″N 139°19′28″E		
Miharada Suwajō Site Tile Tower Buddhist Remains 三原田諏訪上遺跡瓦塔設置仏教遺溝; Miharada Suwajō iseki gatō setchi Bukkyō noko mizo	Shibukawa			36°30′23″N 139°01′50″E		
Saitō Gigi Grave 斉藤宜義の墓; Saitō Gigi no haka	Tamamura	at Hōzō-ji (宝蔵寺)		36°19′09″N 139°05′48″E		
Chōsui Okinazuka 鳥酔翁塚; Chōsui okinazuka	Shibukawa	at Sōrin-ji (雙林寺)		36°32′17″N 139°00′24″E		
Ryokuden Iai Stele 力田遺愛碑; Ryokuden Iai hi	Maebashi	at Kōgan-ji (光巌寺)		36°24′28″N 139°02′09″E		
Ishida Genkei Grave 石田玄圭の墓; Ishida Genkei no haka	Maebashi			36°24′49″N 139°01′16″E		
Ono Ryōsuke Eijū Grave 小野良佐栄重の墓; Ono Ryōsuke Eijū no haka	Annaka	at Nansō-ji (南窓寺)		36°20′17″N 138°55′31″E		
Ehara Genzaemon Shigehisa Grave 江原源左衛門重久の墓（附 江原家文書） Ehara Genzaemon Shigehisa no haka (tsuketari Ehara-ke monjo)	Takasaki	at Jigen-ji (慈眼寺); designation includes the Ehara Family Documents		36°20′17″N 138°55′31″E		
Kero Gonzo Grave 毛呂権蔵の墓; Kero Gonzo no haka	Ōta	at Fumon-ji (普門寺)		36°15′49″N 139°16′46″E		
Hōkyōintō 宝篋印塔; Hōkyōintō	Shibukawa			36°30′00″N 139°03′03″E		
Yoshida Shikei Grave 吉田芝渓の墓; Yoshida Shikei no haka	Shibukawa			36°29′56″N 138°57′36″E		
Funatsu Denjibei Grave 船津伝次平の墓; Funatsu Denjibei no haka	Maebashi			36°29′58″N 138°57′38″E		
Okanobori Kageyoshi Grave 岡登景能の墓; Okanobori Kageyoshi no haka	Midori	at Kokuzu-ji (国瑞寺)		36°23′43″N 139°17′11″E		
Horiguchi Ranen Grave 堀口藍園の墓; Horiguchi Ranen no haka	Shibukawa			36°29′46″N 138°59′26″E		
Baba Shigehisa Grave 馬場重久の墓; Baba Shigehisa no haka	Yoshioka			36°29′46″N 138°59′26″E		
Ōya Kyūhaku Grave 大谷休泊の墓; Ōya Kyūhaku no haka	Tatebayashi			36°15′20″N 139°30′17″E		
Sakakibara Yasumasa Grave 榊原康政の墓（附 同画像） Sakakibara Yasumasa no haka (tsuketari dō-gazō)	Tatebayashi	at Zendō-ji (善導寺); designation includes a painted portrait of Sakakibara Yasumasa		36°14′36″N 139°33′56″E		
Oguri Kōzukenosuke Tadamasa Grave 小栗上野介忠順の墓; Oguri Kōzukenosuke Tadamasa no haka	Takasaki	at Tōzen-ji (東善寺)		36°26′41″N 138°46′19″E		
Nakaiya Jūbee Grave 中居屋重兵衛の墓（附 関係文書） Nakaiya Jūbee no haka (tsuketari kankei monjo)	Tsumagoi	designation includes related documents		36°31′56″N 138°32′35″E		
Takahashi Dōsai Grave 高橋道斉の墓; Takahashi Dōsai no haka	Shimonita	at Jōjū-ji (常住寺)		36°12′44″N 138°47′18″E		
Kanai Ushū and Family Graves 金井烏洲と一族の墓; Kanai Ushū to ichizoku no haka	Isesaki			36°14′44″N 139°14′23″E		
Mokugabashi Barrier Site 杢ヶ橋関所跡（附 関係資料） Mokugabashi sekisho ato (tsuketari kankei shiryō)	Shibukawa	designation includes related materials		36°31′29″N 138°59′05″E		
Sarugakyō Barrier Site and Old Residence 猿ヶ京関所跡並びに旧役宅（附 関係資料） Sarugakyō sekisho ato oyobi kyū-yakutaku (tsuketari kankei shiryō)	Maebashi	designation includes related materials		36°43′35″N 138°53′11″E		
Kamiizumi Storehouse 上泉郷蔵（附 上泉古文書） Kamiizumi gōgura (tsuketari Kamiizumi komonjo)	Maebashi	designation includes Old Kamiizumi Documents		36°23′55″N 139°06′26″E		
Ichirizuka 一里塚; Ichirizuka	Takasaki			36°20′00″N 138°58′05″E		
Senshintei 洗心亭; Senshintei	Takasaki			36°19′49″N 138°57′21″E		
Kirihara Storehouse and its Documents 桐原郷蔵及び郷蔵文書; Kirihara gōgura oyobi gōgura monjo	Midori			36°26′04″N 139°16′02″E		
Usui Barrier Site 碓氷関所跡; Usui sekisho ato	Annaka			36°20′17″N 138°43′49″E		
Maniwa Nen-ryū Dōjō and related Documents 馬庭念流道場及び関係文書; Maniwa nenryū dōjō oyobi kankei monjo	Takasaki			36°15′49″N 139°00′17″E		
Goryō Chaya Honjin Onishi 五料の茶屋本陣・お西; Goryō no chaya honjin onishi	Annaka			36°19′23″N 138°46′05″E		
Yokokawa Chaya Honjin 横川の茶屋本陣; Yokokawa no chaya honjin・onishi	Annaka			36°20′15″N 138°44′00″E		
Kamitoyooka Chaya Honjin 上豊岡の茶屋本陣; Kamitoyooka no chaya honjin onishi	Takasaki			36°20′00″N 138°58′05″E		
Goryō Chaya Honjin Ohigashi 五料の茶屋本陣・お東; Goryō no chaya honjin・ohigashi	Annaka			36°19′22″N 138°46′06″E		
Tōnosawa Stone Image of Shaka Entering Parinirvāṇa 塔ノ沢の石造釈迦涅槃像; Tōnosawa no sekizō Shaka nehan zō	Midori			36°19′22″N 138°46′06″E		

== Municipal Historic Sites ==
As of 1 May 2014, a further four hundred and forty-seven Sites have been designated as being of municipal importance.

== See also ==
- Cultural Properties of Japan
- Kōzuke Province
- List of Places of Scenic Beauty of Japan (Gunma)
- List of Cultural Properties of Japan - historical materials (Gunma)
- List of Cultural Properties of Japan - paintings (Gunma)
- Gunma Prefectural Museum of History
