= Sai District Shōsō ruins =

Kōzuke Province Sai District Shōsō Site
- 上野国佐位郡正倉跡 (Japanese)
- Kōzuke Province Sai District Shōsō Site Sai District Shōsō ruins (Japan)
- 36°18′41″N 139°11′48″E
- Periods: Nara to Heian period
- Location: Isesaki, Gunma, Japan
- Region: Kantō region

Site notes
- Area: 91,072 m^{2} (980,290 sq ft)
- Public access: Yes (no public facilities)

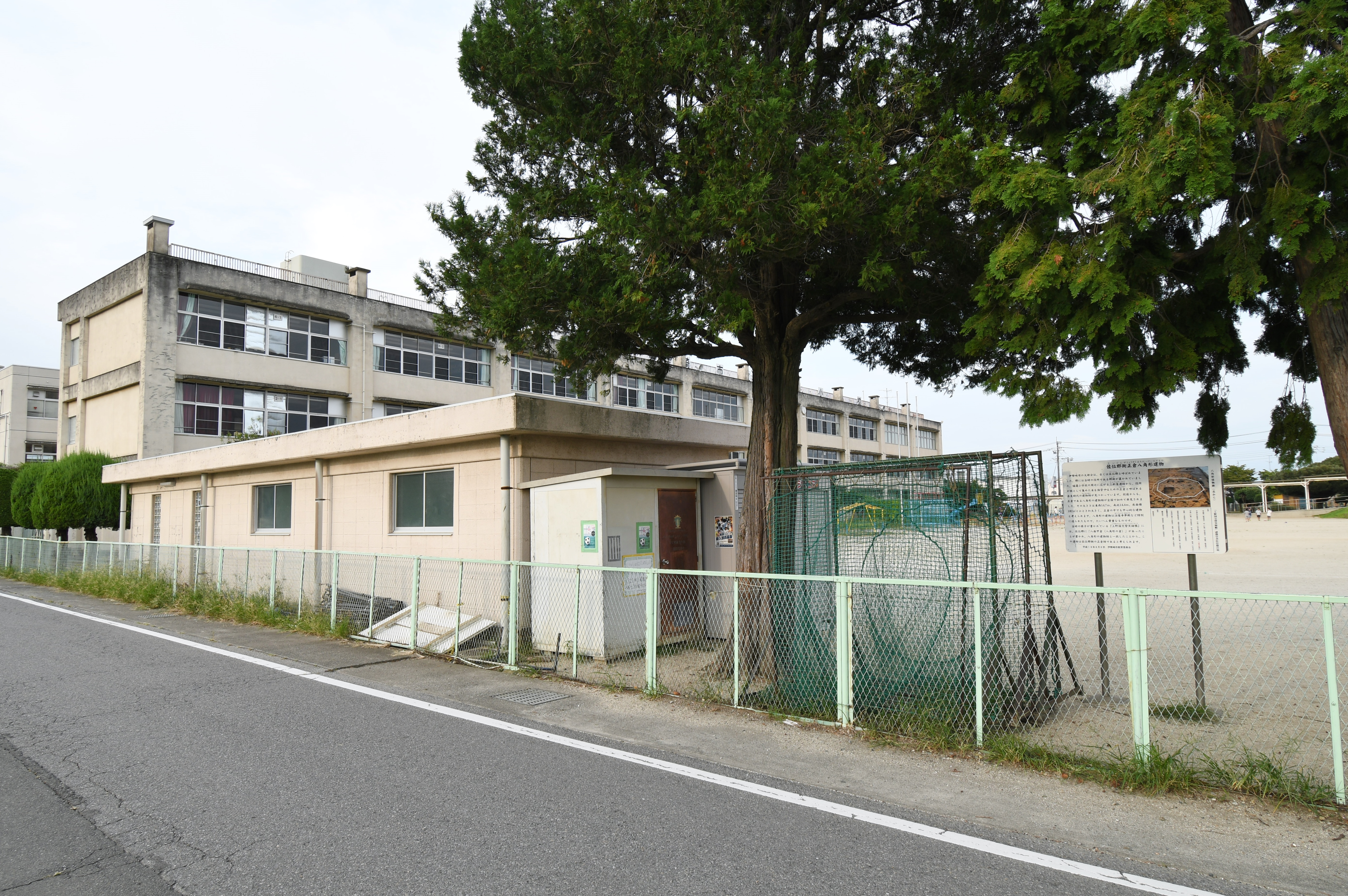
Sai Gunga Site

The Kōzuke Province Sai District Shōsō Site (上野国佐位郡正倉跡, Kōzuke no kuni Sai-gun shōsō ato) is an archaeological site with the ruins of a Nara to Heian period regional administrative complex, located in what is now the city of Isesaki, Gunma Prefecture in the northern Kantō region of Japan. The site was designated a National Historic Site of Japan in 2014.

== Overview ==
In the late Nara period, after the establishment of a centralized government under the Ritsuryō system and Taika Reforms, local rule over the provinces was standardized under a kokufu (provincial capital), and each province was divided into smaller administrative districts, known as (郡, gun, kōri), composed of 2–20 townships in 715 AD. Each of the units had an administrative complex built on a semi-standardized layout based on contemporary Chinese design.

The site was formerly known as the Sangenya Site (三軒屋遺跡, Sangenya iseki). It is located on slightly elevated ground near the conjunction of the Wata and Segawa Rivers. From 2002 to 2011, 18 archaeological excavations were conducted by the Isesaki City Board of Education. These excavations found a warehouse group of 15 cornerstone buildings and more than 40 pit pillar buildings within an area of approximately 60,000 square meters. This facility was used from the second half of the 7th century to the first half of the 10th century, and correspond to a government facility for storing grains and other produce received as tax revenues for ancient Sai District in Kōzuke Province. The exact location of the corresponding kanga, or administrative complex, itself remains undiscovered.

In the 2005 survey, the foundation stones for a unique octagonal granary was found. This corresponded to a building that was documentation in ancient records and was a rare case where archaeological findings precisely matched ancient records.

== See also ==
- List of Historic Sites of Japan (Gunma)
