= Tago District Shōsō ruins =

Archaeological site in Japan

Kōzuke Province Tago District Warehouse ruins
- 上野国多胡郡正倉跡 (Japanese)
- Kōzuke Province Tago District Warehouse ruins Tago District Shōsō ruins (Japan)
- 36°15′41″N 138°59′48″E
- Periods: Nara to Heian period
- Location: Takasaki, Gunma, Japan
- Region: Kantō region

History
- Built: 7th to 10th century

Site notes
- Area: 28,637 m^{2} (308,250 sq ft)
- Public access: No

The Kōzuke Province Tago District Warehouse ruins (上野国多胡郡正倉跡, Kōzuke-no-kuni Tago-gun shōsō ato) is an archaeological site with the ruins of late Nara period to Heian period government tax warehouse complex located in the Yoshiimachiike neighborhood of the city of Takasaki, Gunma Prefecture in the northern Kantō region of Japan. It was designated a National Historic Site of Japan in 2020.

== Overview ==
In the late Nara period, after the establishment of a centralized government under the Ritsuryō system and Taika Reforms, local rule over the provinces was standardized under a kokufu (provincial capital), and each province was divided into smaller administrative districts, known as (郡, gun, kōri), composed of 2–20 townships in 715 AD. Each of the units had an administrative complex built on a semi-standardized layout based on contemporary Chinese design, with rectangular layout surrounded by a moat, earthen ramparts and wooden palisade. Within were the administrative buildings, typically in a "U" shape, and often within a secondary enclosure. Either within the primary enclosure, or else nearby was a group of warehouses arranged in regularly spaced rows, protected by its own palisade and moat. These warehouses were granaries used for storing rice or other produce, which was collected as taxation from the local inhabitants.

Although the site of district office for ancient Tago District has not yet been discovered, the existence of this administrative division and the approximate location of the kanga (官衙), or administrative office is known from the Tago Stele, a contemporary stone monument located 350 meters to the north. From its inscription, this complex was built in 711 AD. The warehouse complex with granaries for storing tax rice was in a compound 210 meters from north-to-south and 55 meters from east-to-west on its northern border. It is uncertain if the compound was square, or trapezoidal, as the southern borders has not yet been confirmed. The compound was surrounded by a moat with a width of two to three meters. Within, an archaeological excavation confirmed the cornerstones marking the locations of two buildings, and from the distribution of other stones and large accumulation of roof tile shards, it is estimated that many other buildings existed within this area. One of the buildings confirmed was at north end of the compound, and was a large 3 x 7 bay structure, which may have been the actual kanga office.

== See also ==
- List of Historic Sites of Japan (Gunma)
