= Minakami Stone Age Residence Site =

Archaeological site in Japan

- 水上石器時代住居跡 (Japanese)
- Minakami Stone Age Residence Site ruins Minakami Stone Age Residence Site (Japan)
- 36°47′35″N 138°58′50″E
- Type: settlement
- Periods: Jōmon period
- Location: Minakami, Gunma, Japan
- Region: Kantō region

Site notes
- Public access: Yes

The Minakami Stone Age Residence Site (水上石器時代住居跡, Minakami sekki-jidai jūkyo ato) is an archaeological site with the ruins of a Jōmon period settlement, located in what is now part of the town of Minakami, Gunma Prefecture in the northern Kantō region of Japan. The site was designated a National Historic Site of Japan in 1944.

== Overview ==
The Minakami site is located on a river terrace of a small tributary of the Tone River. It consists of the traces of two late Jōmon period dwellings with flagstone floors containing a stone-lined rectangular hearth in the center, separated by about 100 meters of swampy ground. The first was discovered in 1935 and the second in 1937. The flagstones were rounded river stones and the overall dimensions of the dwelling appear to have been two meters by four meters in a rough ellipse. Pot-shaped Jōmon pottery earthenware and various stone tools such as stone axes, arrowheads and stone plates were also excavated.

The ruins are now covered with small sheds for preservation, and the remains can be seen though a small window. The site is located about 5 minutes by car from Minakami Station on the JR East Jōetsu Line.

== See also ==
- List of Historic Sites of Japan (Gunma)
