= Saishikada Nakajima Site =

Archeological site in Midori, Gunma, Japan

Saishikada Nakajima ruins
- 西鹿田中島遺跡 (Japanese)
- Saishikada Nakajima ruins Saishikada Nakajima Site (Japan)
- 36°24′25″N 139°15′24″E
- Type: settlement
- Periods: Jōmon period
- Location: Midori, Gunma, Japan
- Region: Kantō region

Site notes
- Discovered: 1999
- Public access: Yes (museum at site)

The Saishikada Nakajima ruins (西鹿田中島遺跡, Saishikada Nakajima iseki) is an archaeological site containing the ruins of an early Jōmon period settlement (around 9000 to 11,000 BC) located in what is now the Kasagi neighborhood of the city of Midori, Gunma Prefecture in the northern Kantō region of Japan. The site was designated a National Historic Site of Japan in 2004.

== Overview ==
The Saishikada Nakajima site is located on a river terrace of the Watarase River, in the southern part of Gunma between the Ashio Mountains and Mount Akagi. It was introduced in academic journals from 1939 and in 1959 it became famous because of the discovery of claw-shaped Jōmon pottery and residential structures. An archaeological excavation in 1999 confirmed that the settlement area extended in a roughly elliptical area measuring 150 meters east-to-west by 120 meters north-to-south. The foundations of several pit dwellings were found, along with storage pits and over 3000 artifacts of Jōmon pottery with claw-shaped markings, stone lancets and fishhooks, and clamshells.

The site is located ten minutes by car from Iwajuku Station on the JR East Ryōmō Line. The ruins were backfilled after excavation, but the site contains a small museum (the Saishikada Nakajima Ruins Guidance Facility (西鹿田中島遺跡ガイダンス施設, Saishikada nakajima iseki gaidansu shisetsu) and reconstruction of a pit dwelling.

== See also ==
- List of Historic Sites of Japan (Gunma)
