= Kokuzōzuka Kofun =

Kofun period burial mound in Gunma, Japan

- 虚空蔵塚古墳 (Japanese)
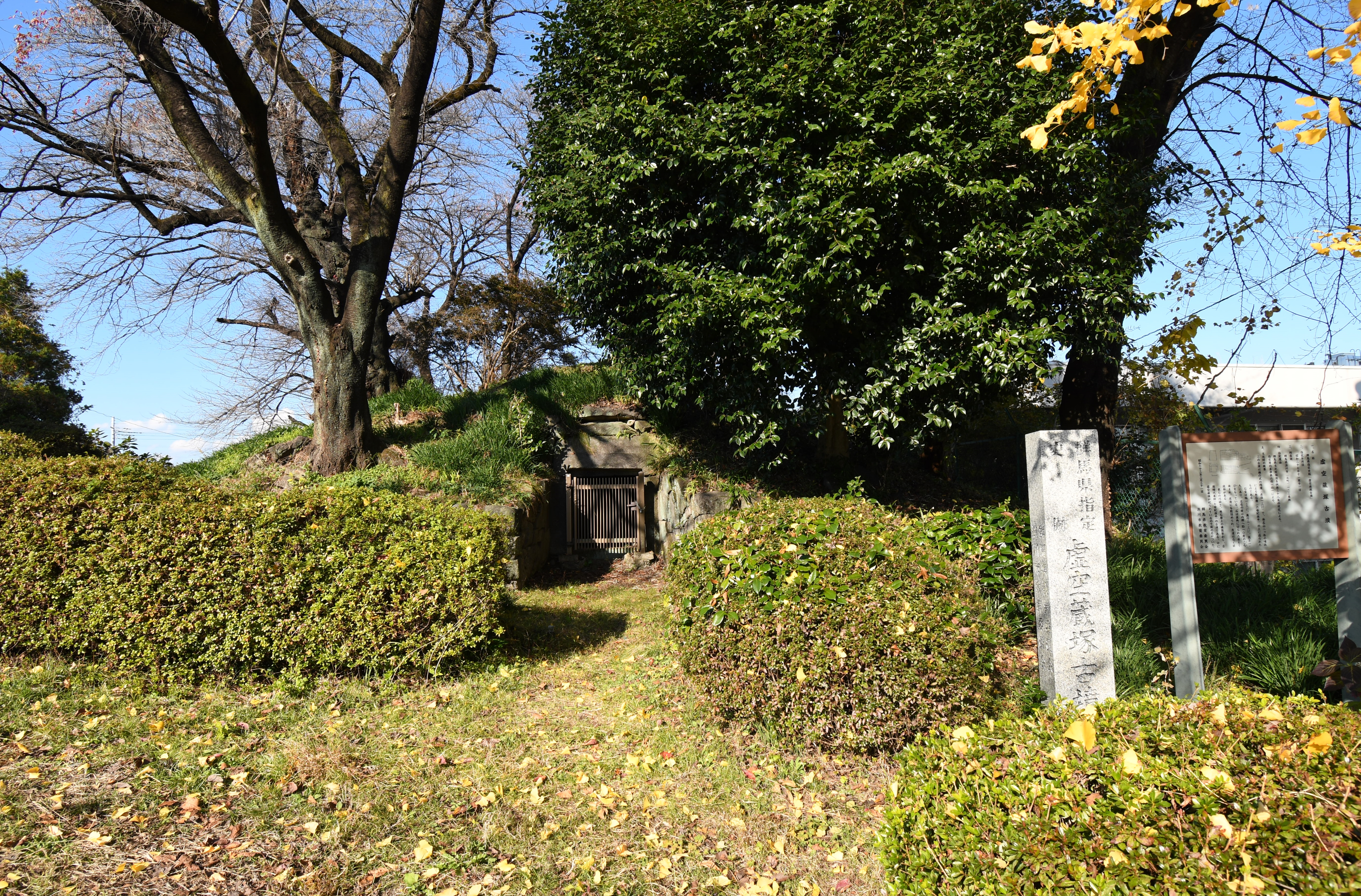
- Kokuzōzuka Kofun

- Kokuzōzuka Kofun Kokuzōzuka Kofun (Japan)
- 36°30′2.58″N 138°59′53.02″E
- Type: Kofun
- Periods: Kofun period
- Location: 123 Shibukawa-cho, Shibukawa, Gunma, Japan
- Region: Kantō region

History
- Built: mid 7th century

Site notes
- Public access: Yes (no facilities)
- Gunma Prefecture Historic Site

Kokuzōzuka Kofun (虚空蔵塚古墳) is a Kofun period burial mound, located in the Shibukawa neighborhood of the city of Shibukawa, Gunma in the Kantō region of Japan. The tumulus was designated a Gunma Prefecture Historic Site in 1952..

== Overview ==
The Kokuzōzuka Kofun is an enpun (円墳)-style circular tumulus located on a slope on the left bank of the Hirasawa River at the eastern foot of Mount Haruna in central Gunma Prefecture. It was constructed on a pumice layer resulting from the eruption of Mount Haruna's Futatsudake in the sixth century. The mound is circular, measuring approximately 14 meters in diameter and three meters in height, although the possibility of a square shape has also been suggested.

The burial chamber is a double-chambered horizontal-entry stone chamber opening to the south-southwest. There is no entrance passage; the chamber consists only of the main chamber and forecourt, and is noteworthy for its elaborate construction using cut andesite stones. It measures 3.1 meters in length, 1.3-1.45 meters in width, and 1.9 meters in height. The back wall is a single monolith, and the ceiling is made of four natural stones. The floor is paved with brick-like cut stones. An elaborate gate structure made of cut stones, with the front of the gateposts and capstone carved inward wa constructed at the front of the burial chamber, measuring 0.95 meters wide and 0.95 meters high. A carving is also found in the center of the capstone on the burial chamber side, and small rectangular holes are visible at the front ends of both side walls, suggesting the presence of a doorstone, which is now gone. Due to its open entrance, the chamber has been subjected to looting since ancient times, and no grave goods have been found. Currently, a statue of Kokuzō Bosatsu is enshrined inside the burial chamber, but access to the burial chamber is currently restricted.

An archaeological excavation was conducted in 1952. From the construction method, the tumulus is estimated to have been completed in the latter half of the 7th century during the final Kofun period.

The characteristics of the burial chamber are noted to be similar to those of the Jaketsuzan Kofun in Maebashi.

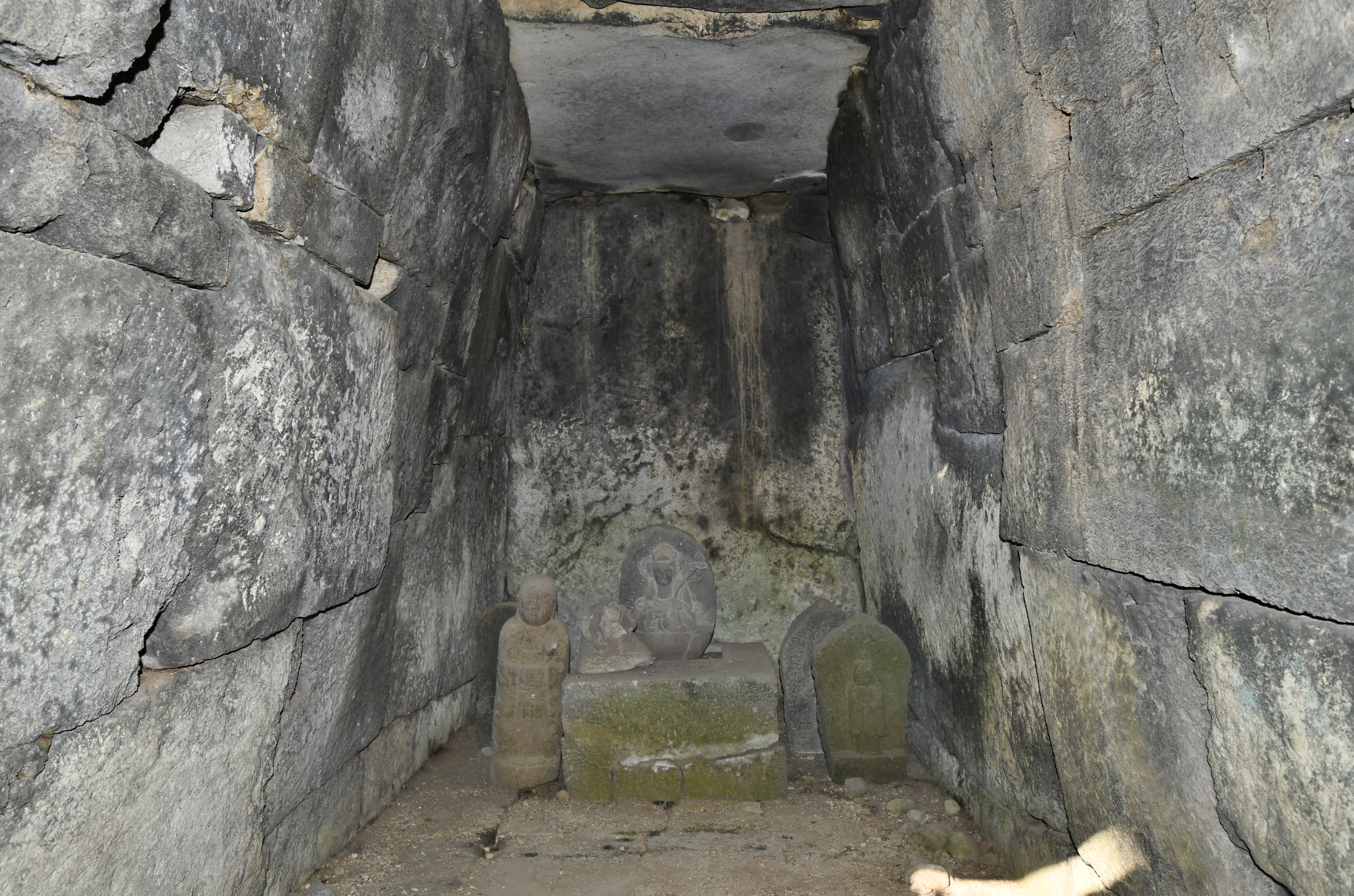
Burial chamber

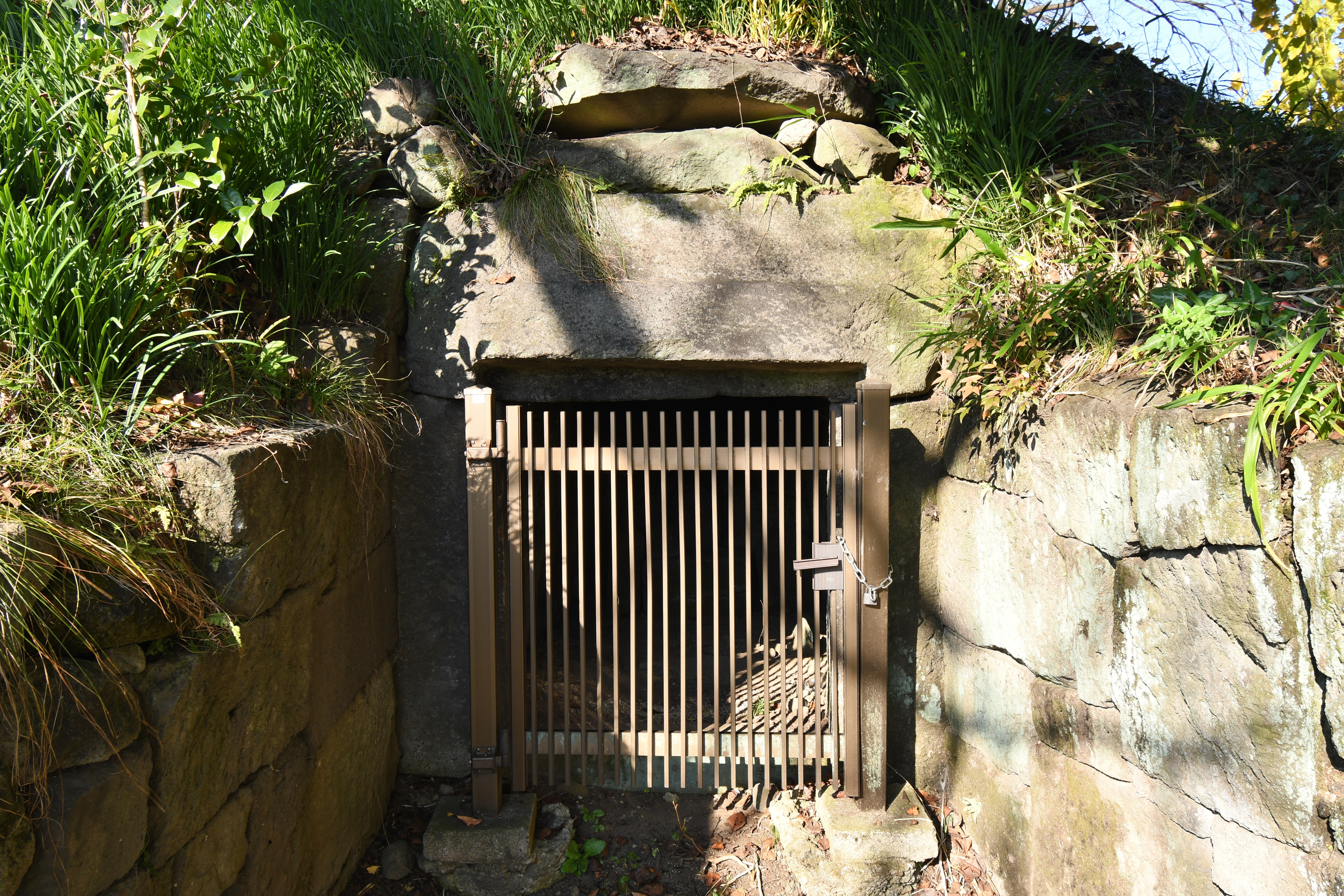
Burial chamber gate

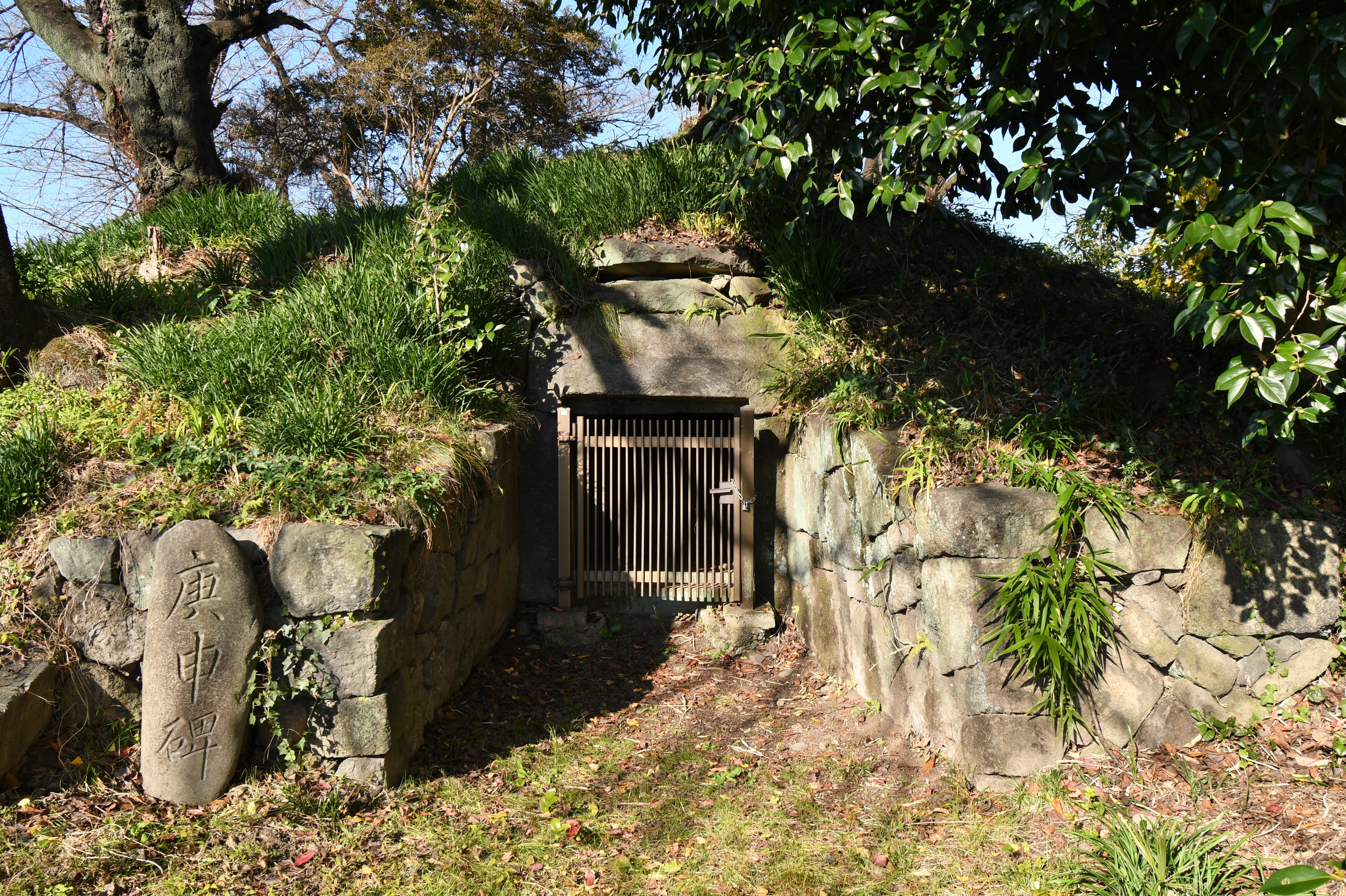
Entry

== See also ==
- List of Historic Sites of Japan (Gunma)
