= Nitta Gunchō ruins =

Kōzuke Province Niita District gun-chō ruins
- 上野国新田郡庁跡 (Japanese)
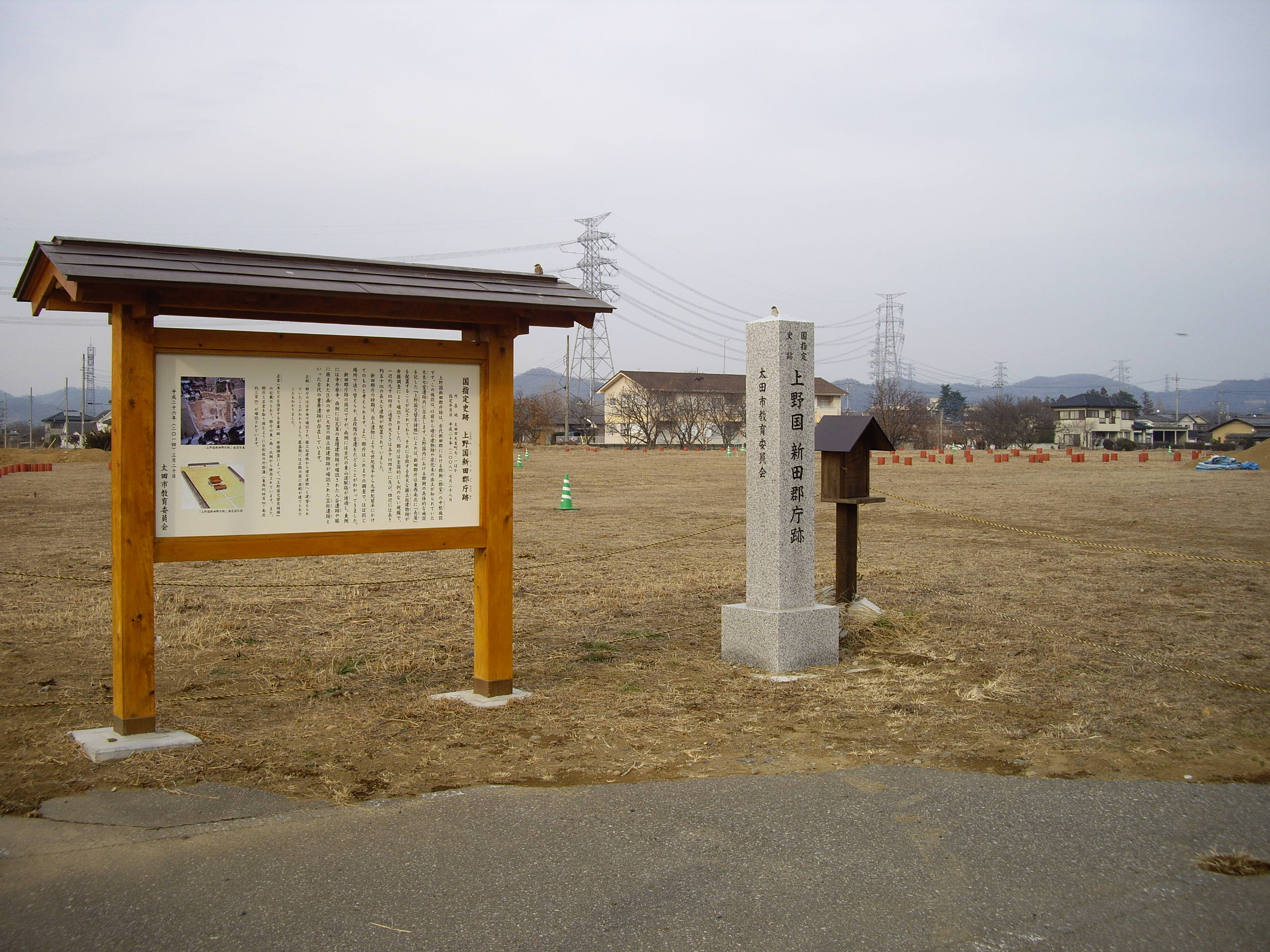
- Kōzuke Province Niita District gun-chō ruins

- Kōzuke Province Sai District Shōsō Site Nitta Gunchō ruins (Japan)
- 36°19′46″N 139°19′55″E
- Periods: Nara to Heian period
- Location: Ōta, Gunma, Japan
- Region: Kantō region

Site notes
- Public access: Yes (no public facilities)

The Kōzuke Province Niita District Gunchō ruins (上野国新田郡庁跡, Kōzuke no kuni Nitta gunchō ato) is an archaeological site with the ruins of a Nara to Heian period regional administrative complex, located in what is now the Tenra neighborhood of the city of Ōta, Gunma Prefecture in the northern Kantō region of Japan. The site was designated a National Historic Site of Japan in 2008.

== Overview ==
In the late Nara period, after the establishment of a centralized government under the Ritsuryō system and Taika Reforms, local rule over the provinces was standardized under a kokufu (provincial capital), and each province was divided into smaller administrative districts, known as (郡, gun, kōri), composed of 2–20 townships in 715 AD. Each of the units had an administrative complex built on a semi-standardized layout based on contemporary Chinese design.

The Niita District Gunchō site was discovered in 2007 in conjunction with land development for a new housing district. The site was originally known as the Tenra Shichido Ruins (天良七堂遺跡, Tenra Shichido iseki) and had long been known as a location where carbonized rice had been found. On archaeological excavation, the foundations for a regional government administrative complex on an unprecedented scale was discovered. The site contained the foundations of 90-meter long buildings forming a square, with a large building with dimensions of 50 meters square in the middle. The remains of a number of granaries for storing tax rice was later discovered in the northwestern part of the ruins in 2015. In addition, In addition, traces of a trapezoidal moat with dimensions of 400 meters east–west by 300 meters north–south were found surrounding the complex. The ruins date from the late 7th century to the early 9th century.

The site was backfilled after excavation and is now an empty field with a monument and explanatory plaque. It is about a 20-minute walk from Jiroenbashi Station on the Tōbu Kiryū Line.

== See also ==
- List of Historic Sites of Japan (Gunma)
