= Tsukamawari Kofun Cluster =

Kofun period burial mounds in Ōta, Gunma, Japan

Tsukamawari Kofun cluster
- 塚廻り古墳群 (Japanese)
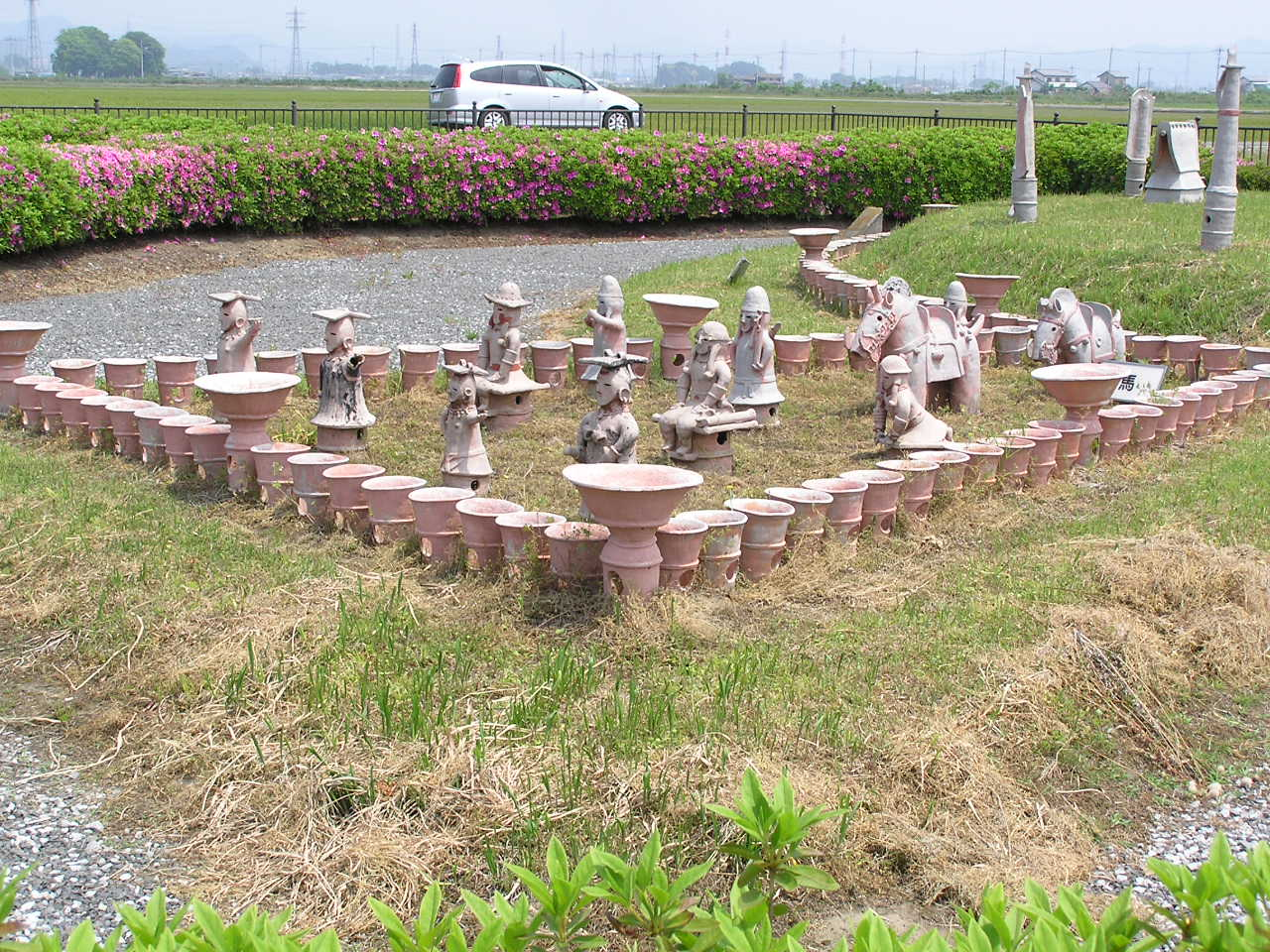
- Tsukamawari Kofun No.4

- Tsukamawari Kofun cluster Tsukamawari Kofun Cluster (Japan)
- 36°17′07.4″N 139°25′25.9″E
- Type: Kofun cluster
- Periods: Kofun period
- Location: Ōta, Gunma, Japan
- Region: Kantō region

History
- Built: early 6th century

Site notes
- Public access: Yes (no facilities)
- National Important Cultural Property Gunma Prefecture Historic Site

The Tsukamawari Kofun cluster (塚廻り古墳群) is a group of Kofun period burial mounds, located in the Ryumai-cho neighborhood of the city of Ōta, Gunma in the Kantō region of Japan. TheTsukamawari No.4 Kofun was designated a Gunma Prefecture Historic Site in 2020, and artifacts recovered from the site were collectively designated a National Important Cultural Property in 1977.

== Overview ==
Tsukamawari Kofun No. 4 is one of 13 hotategata (帆立形古墳)-style or enpun (円墳)-style burial mounds that were accidentally discovered beneath rice paddies during a land improvement project carried out in 1977 in eastern Ōta City. This type of tumulus is similar to a Zenpōkōenfun, but the anterior rectangular portion is very short and wide, resulting in the tumulus appearing like a scallop when viewed from above. The Tsukamawari Kofun No. 4 has total length of 22.5 meters. Based on the characteristics of the haniwa clay figures, it is estimated to have been constructed in the first half of the 6th century. These haniwa include figurative haniwa, including haniwa in the form of houses, shields, swords, horses, and human figures, and were discovered to be in almost intact condition and located in situ, which sheds light on ancient ritual practices.

The haniwa are now stored and displayed at the Gunma Prefectural Museum of History and the Gunma Prefectural Archaeological Research Center. Currently, the kofun, along with the front section of Kofun No. 3, has been restored and developed as a tumulus park and is open to the public.

from Kofun No.1 to Kofun No.3

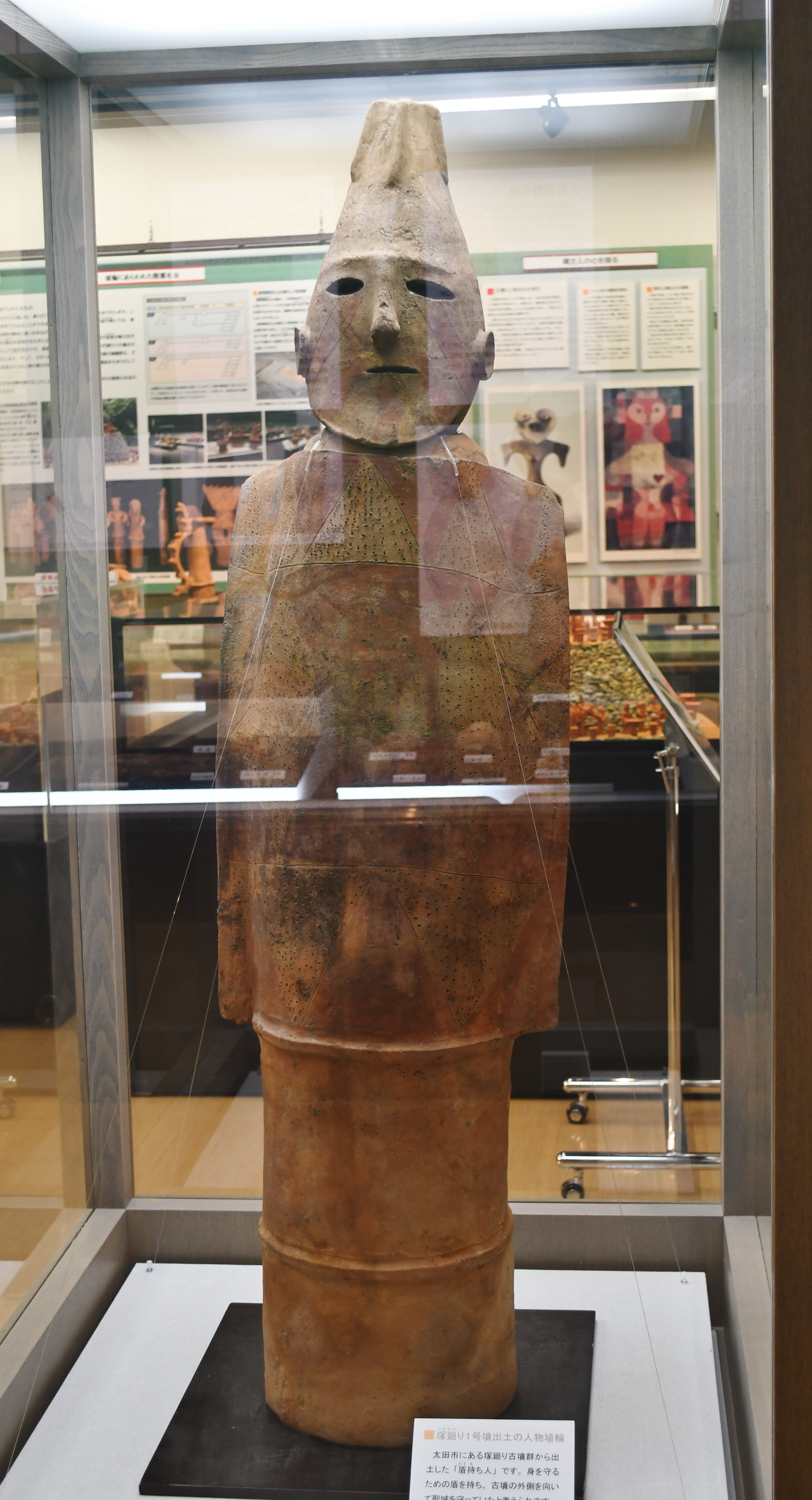
Shield-bearing figure from Kofun No. 1

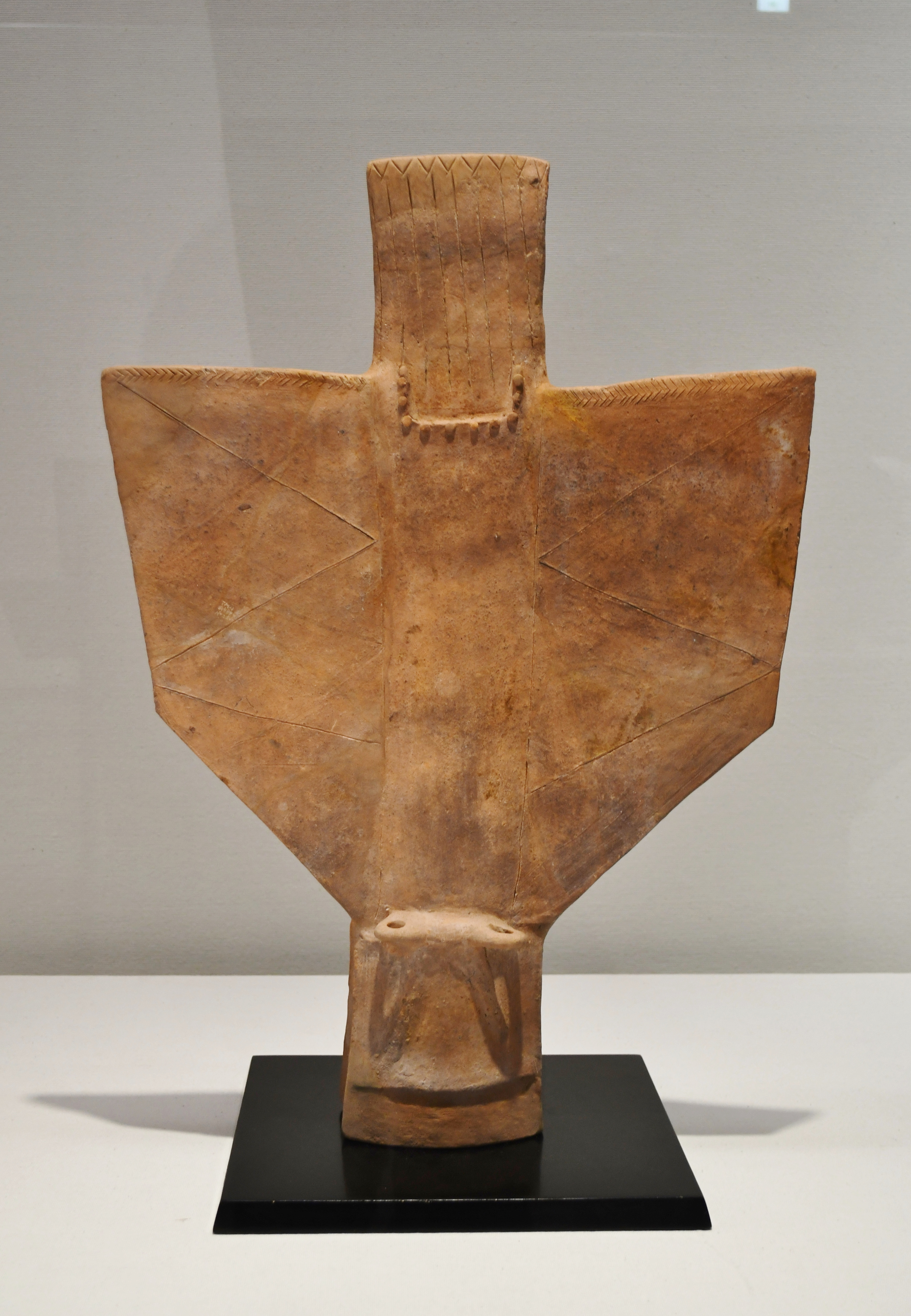
Quiver from Kofun No. 1

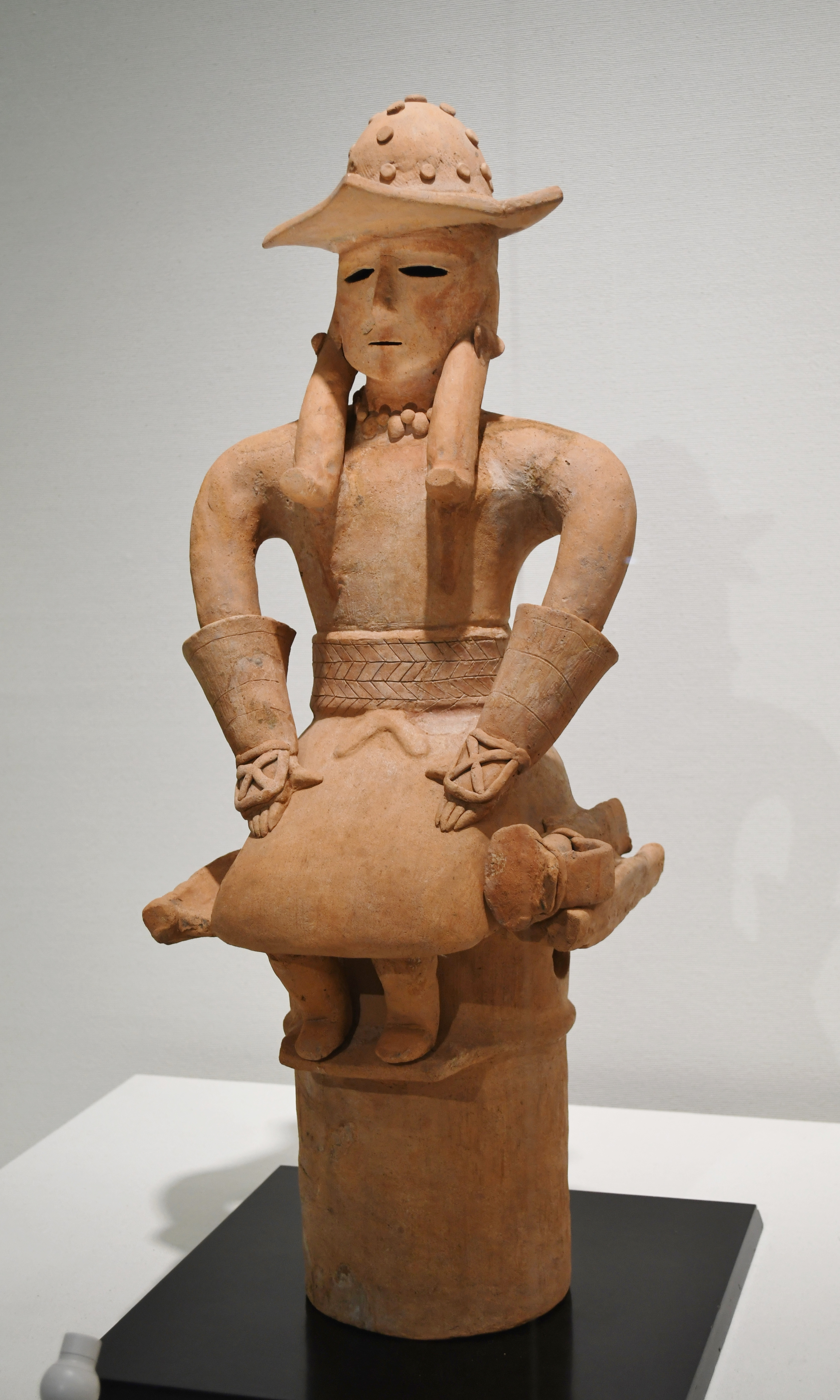
Seated man from Kofun No. 3

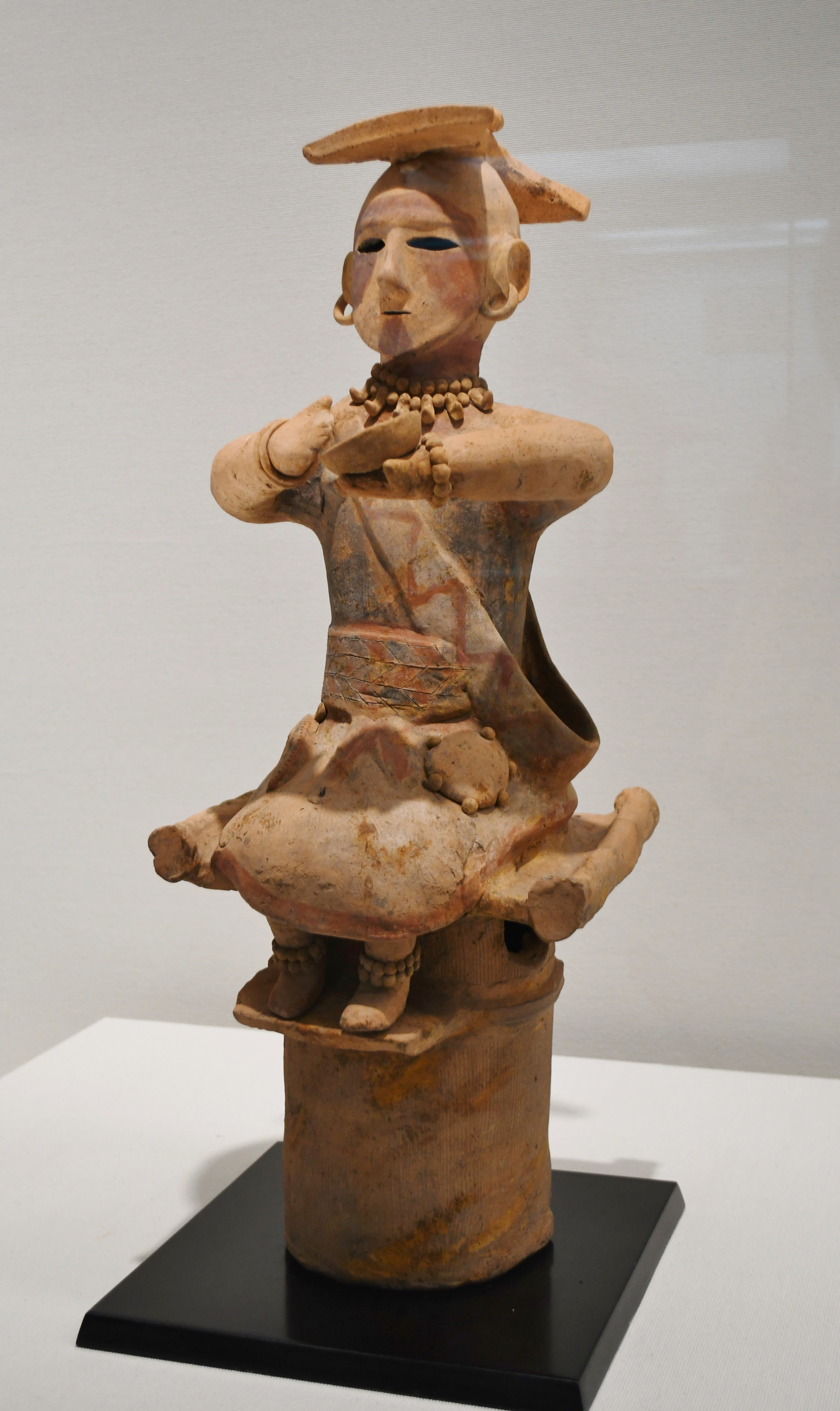
Seated woman from Kofun No. 3

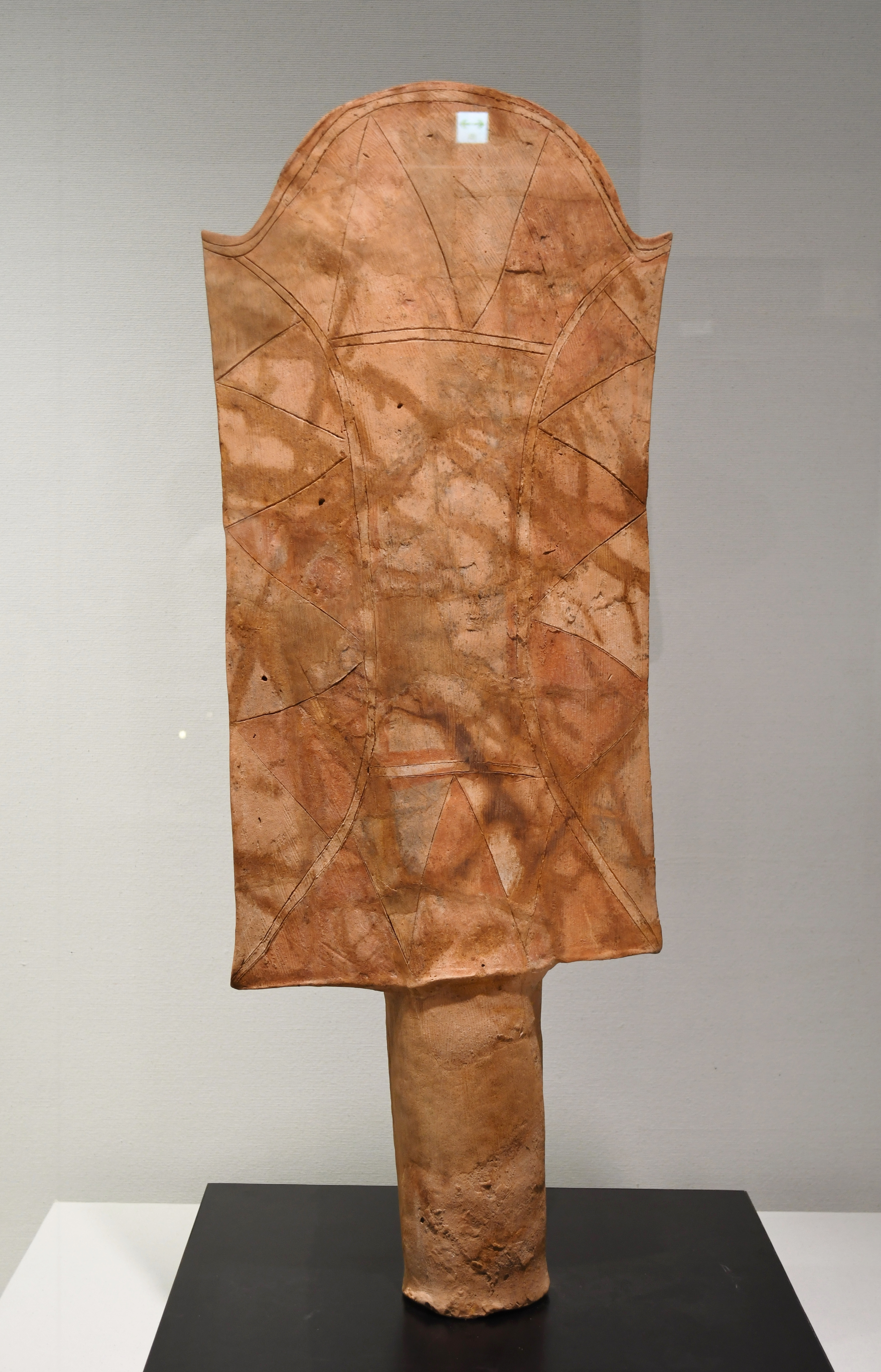
Shield from Kofun No. 3
from Kofun No.4

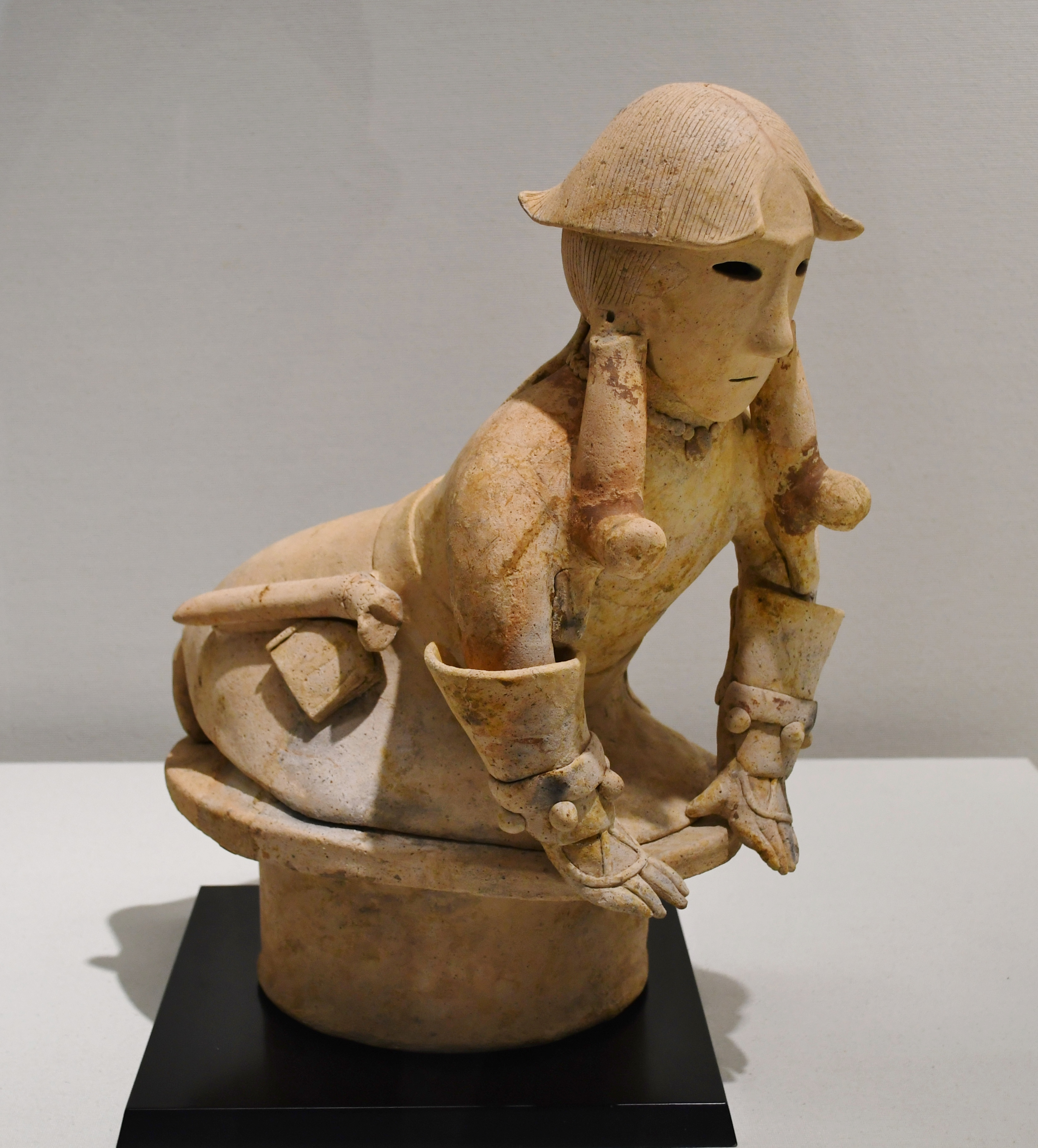
Kneeling Man

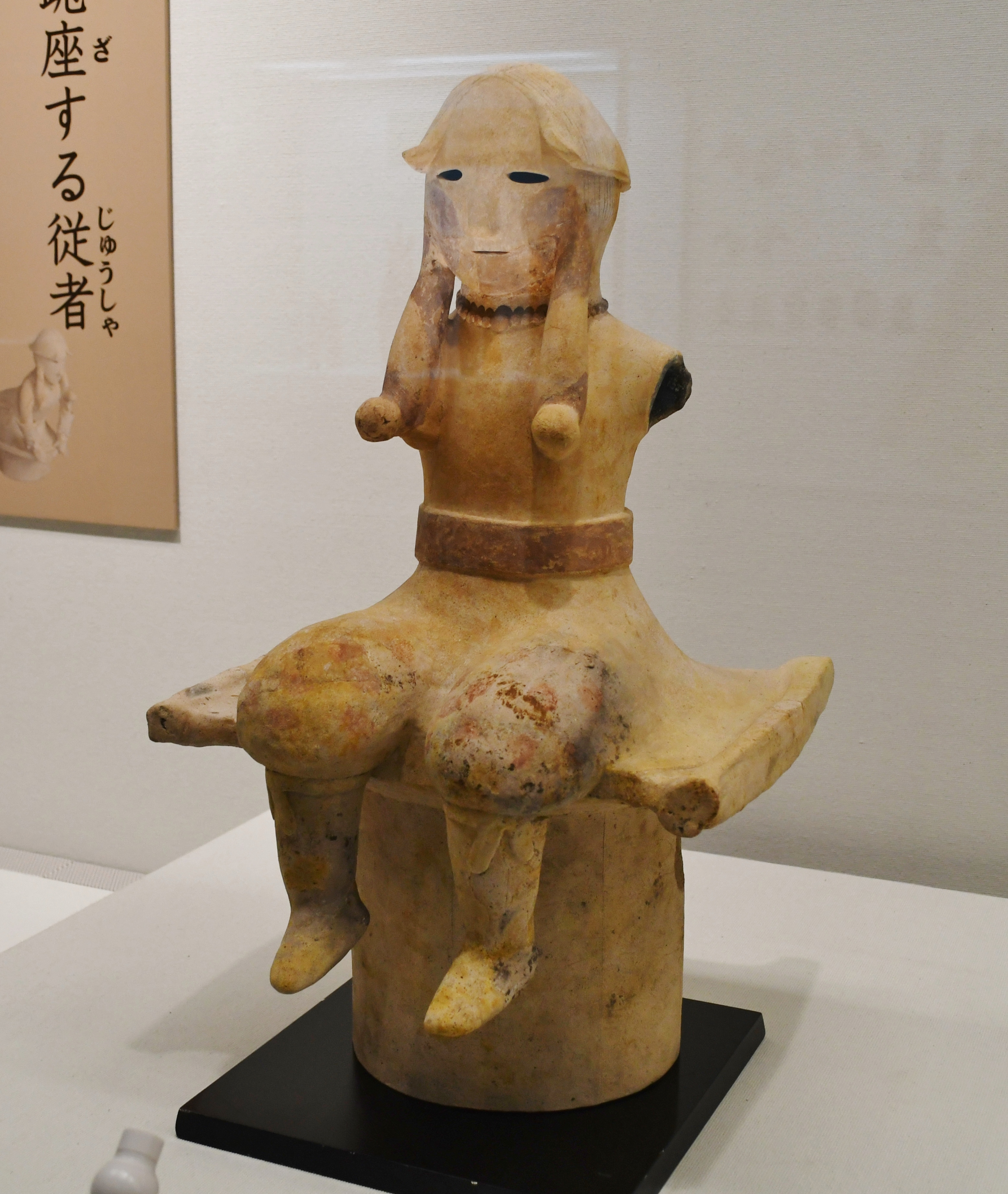
Leaning Man

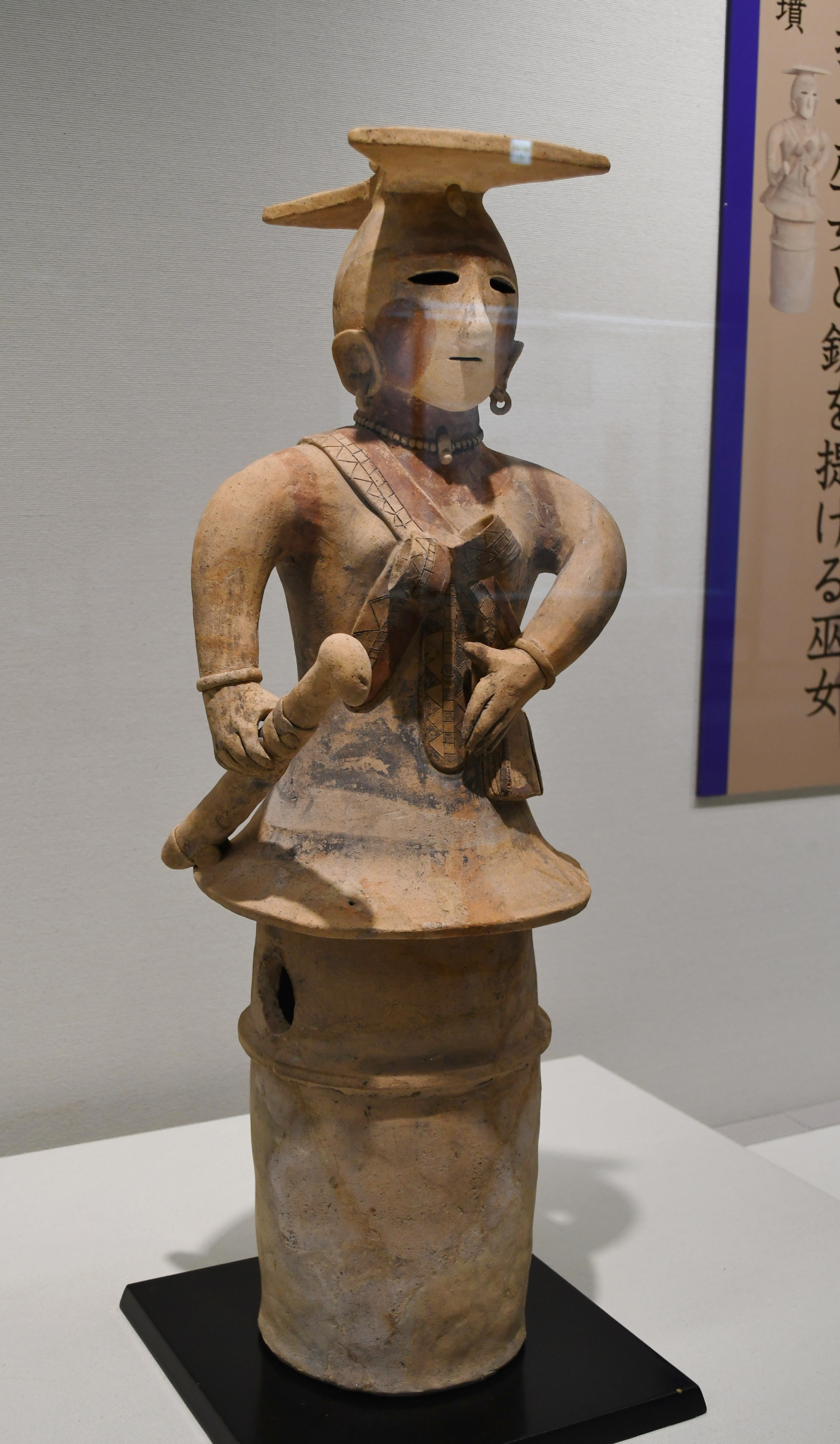
Woman with sword

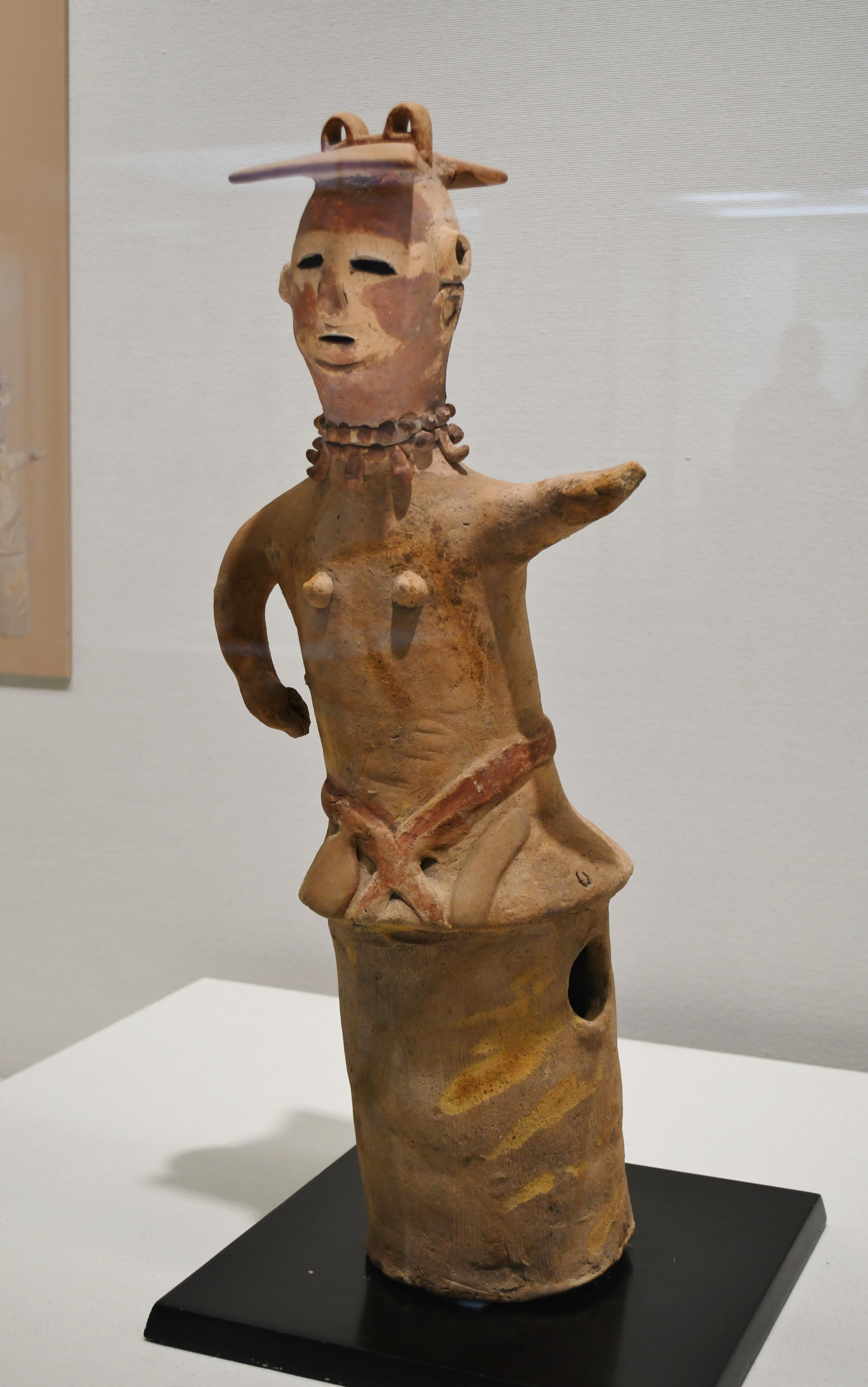
Woman raising left hand

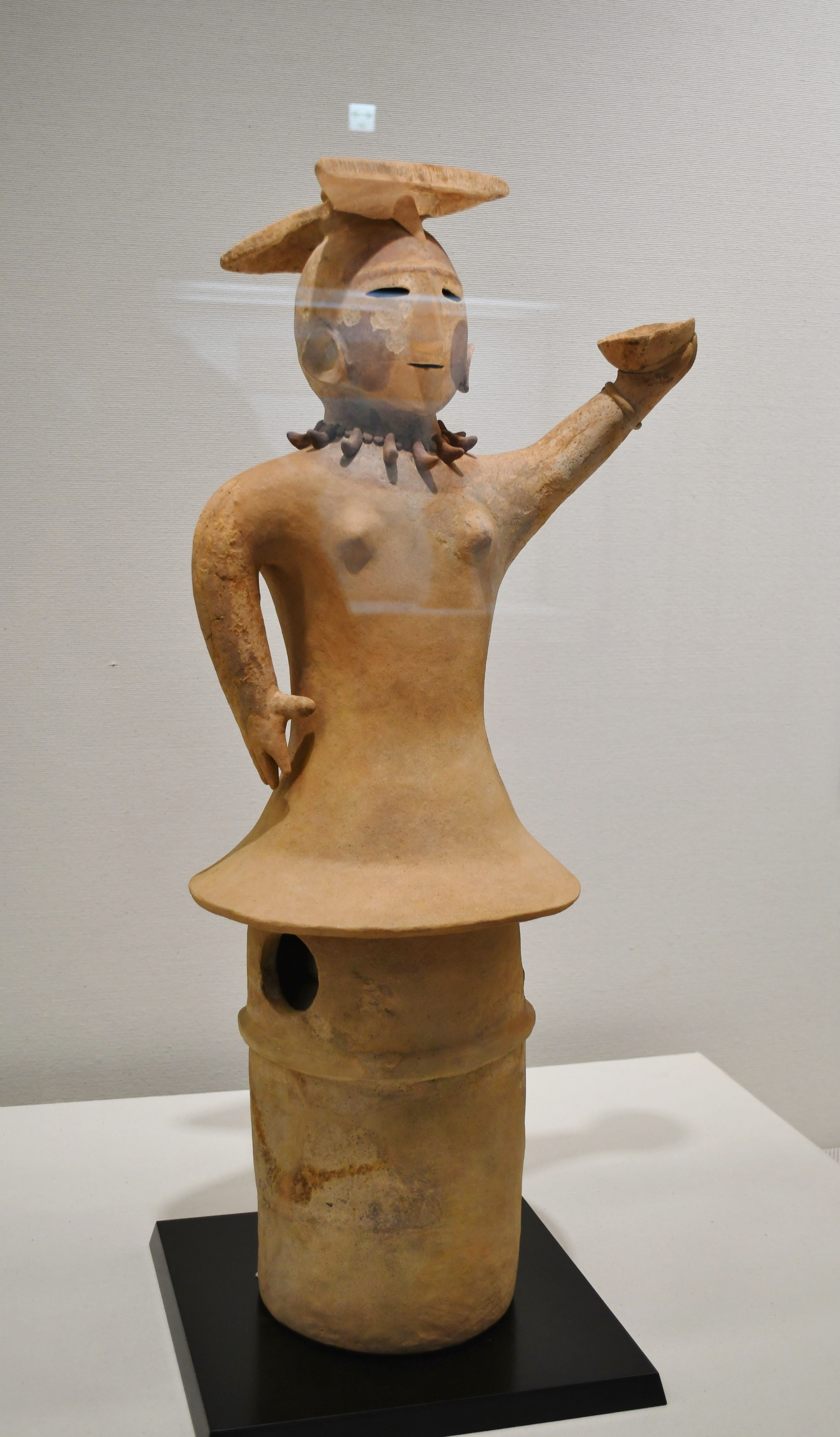
Woman with a bowl

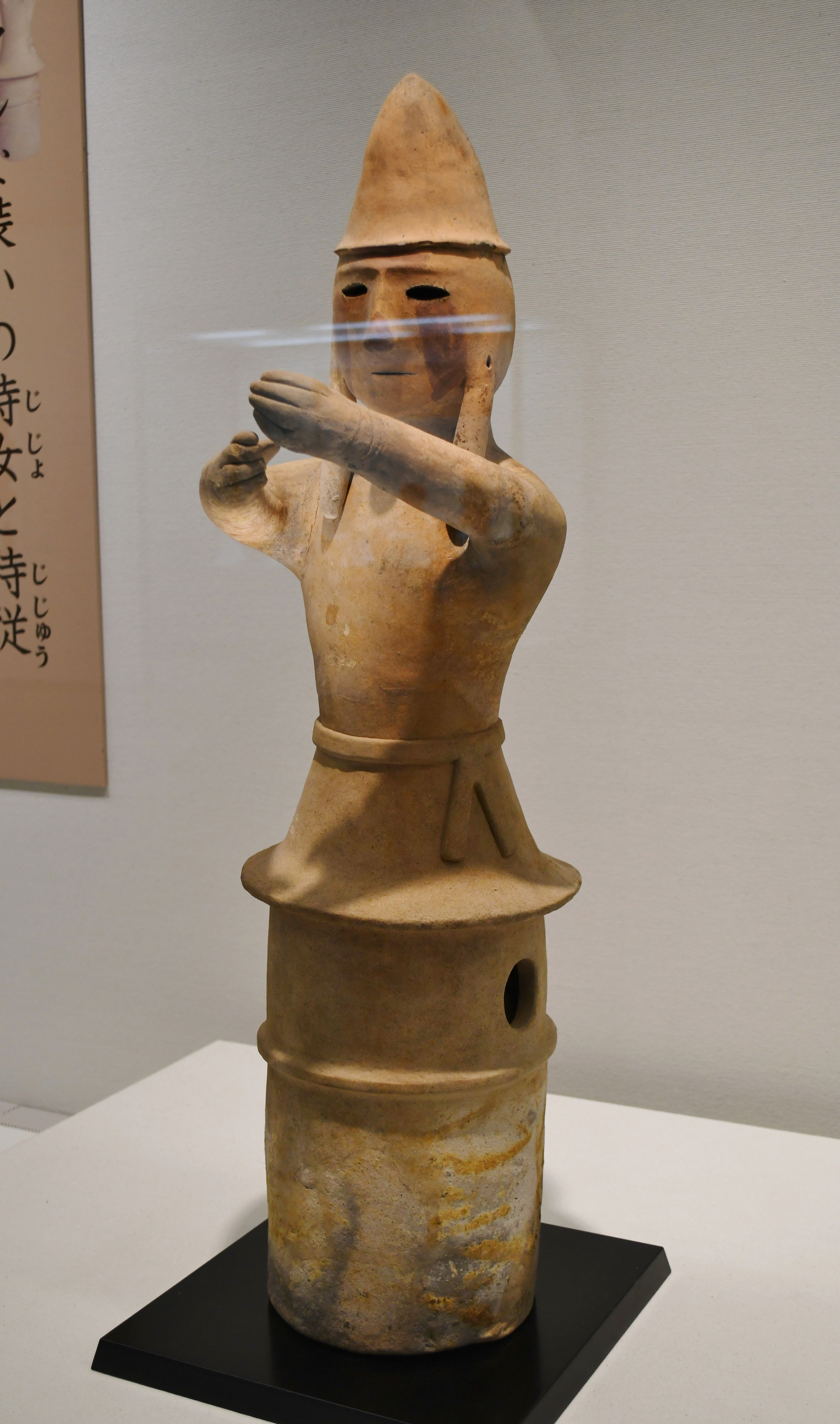
Man Holding Something

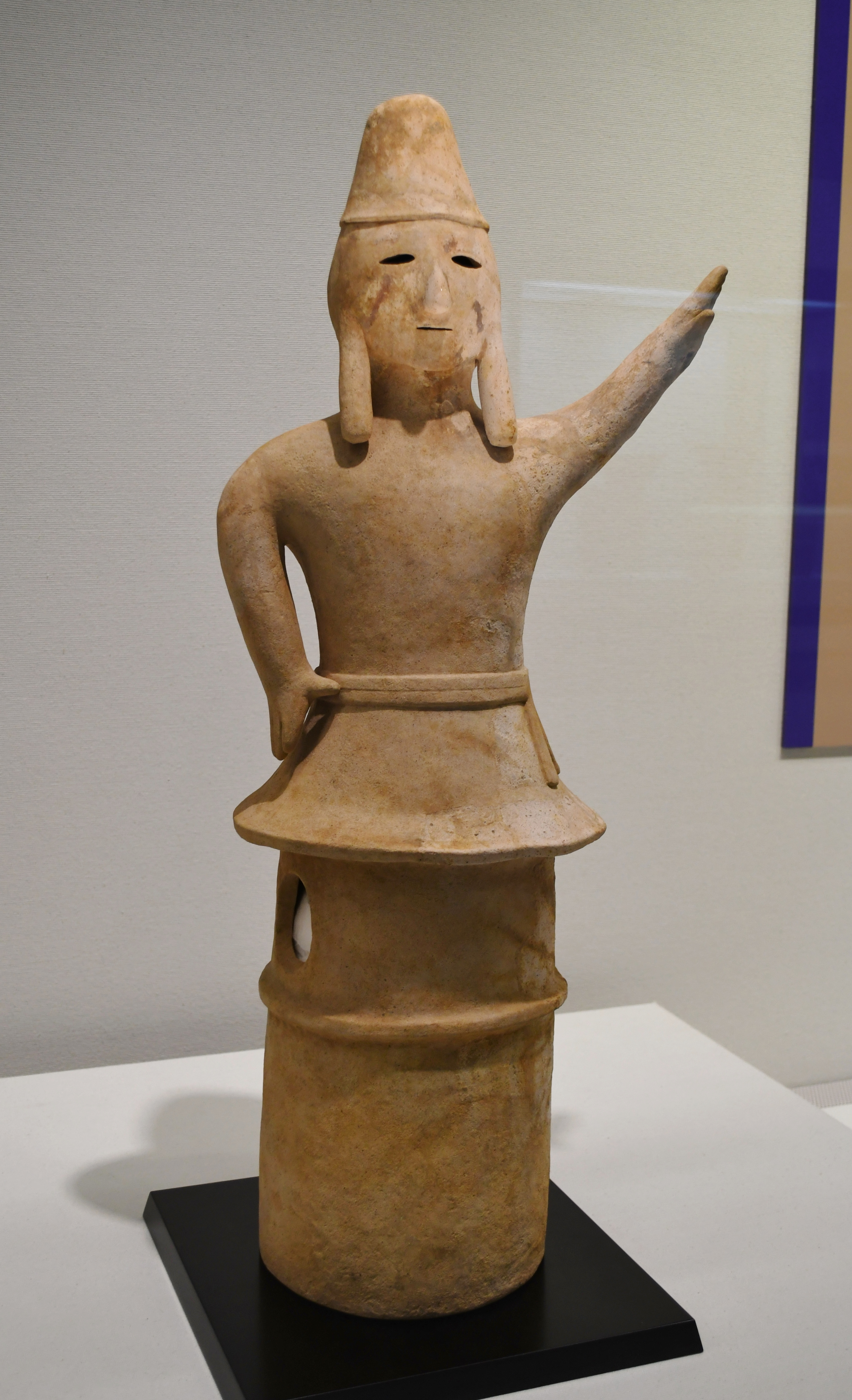
Man raising left hand

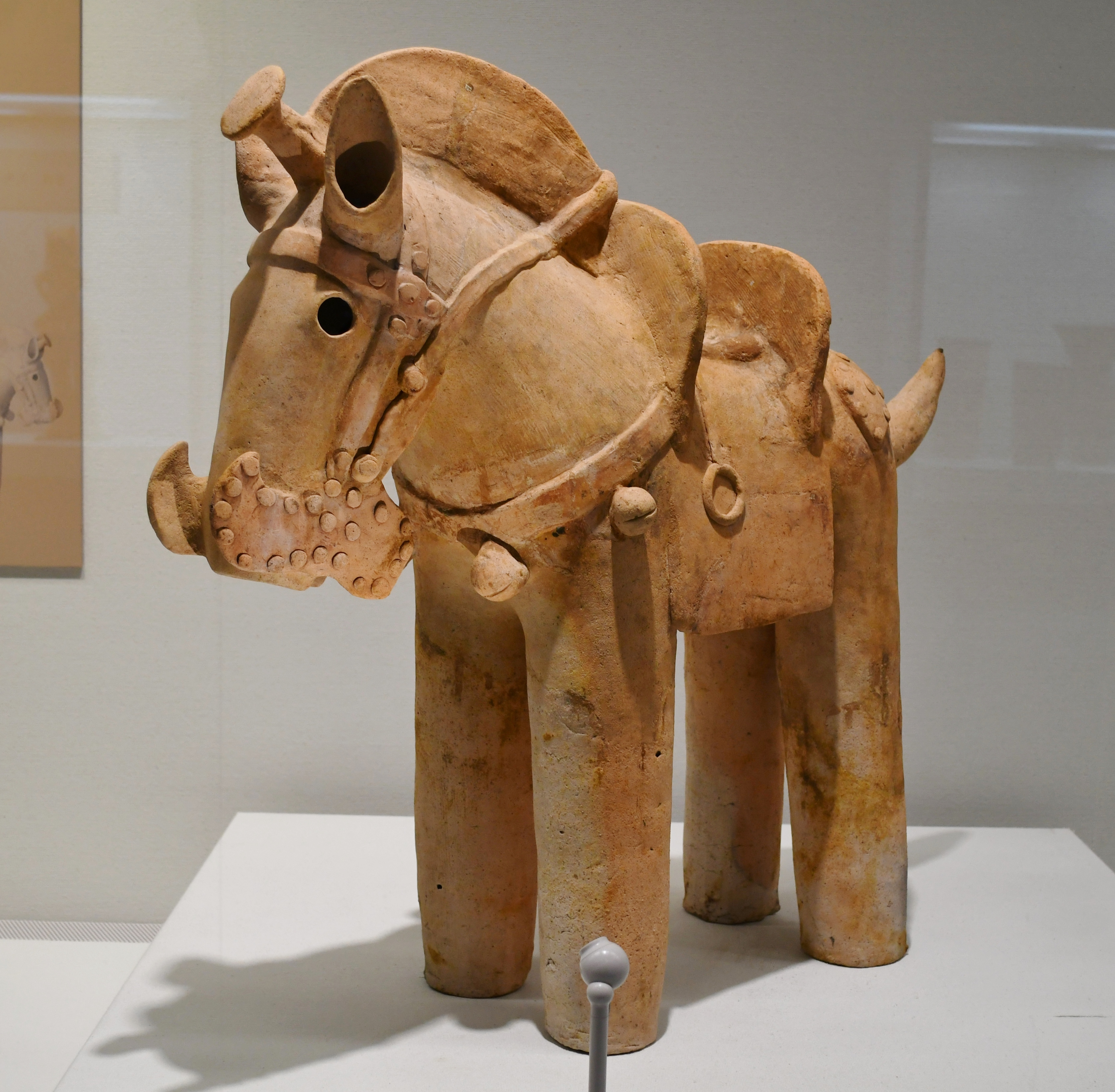
Decorated Horse

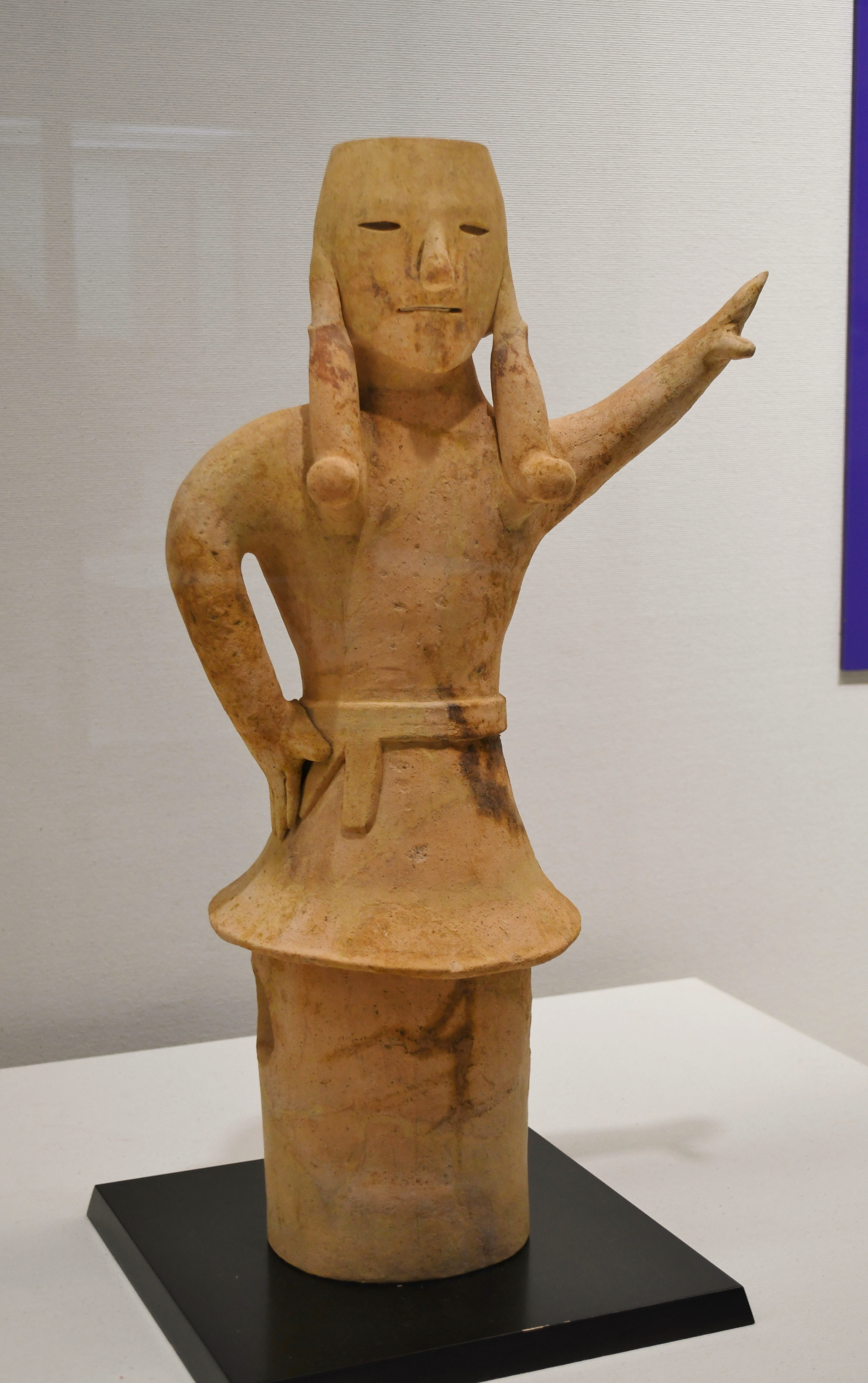
Man raising left hand

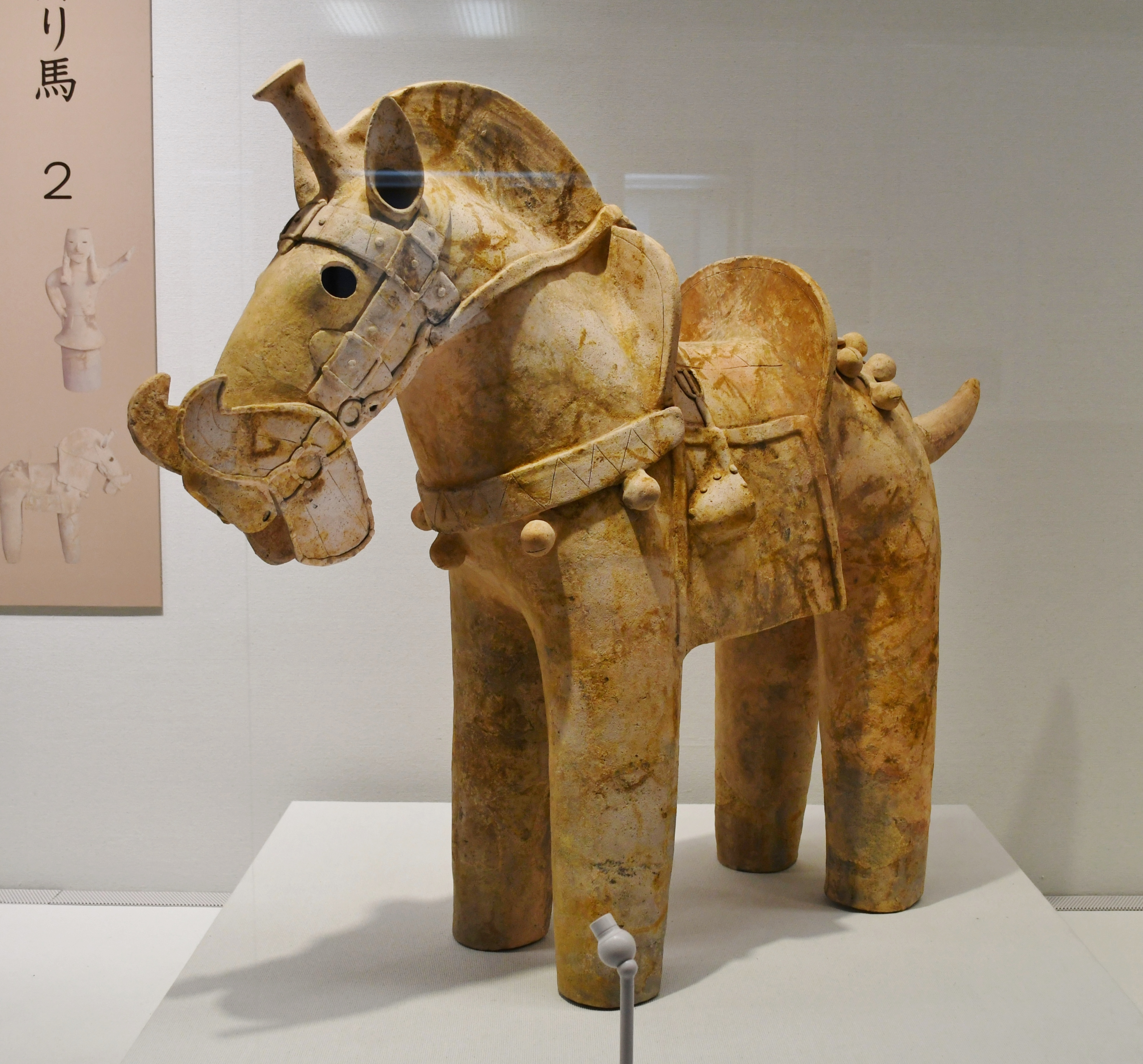
Decorated Horse

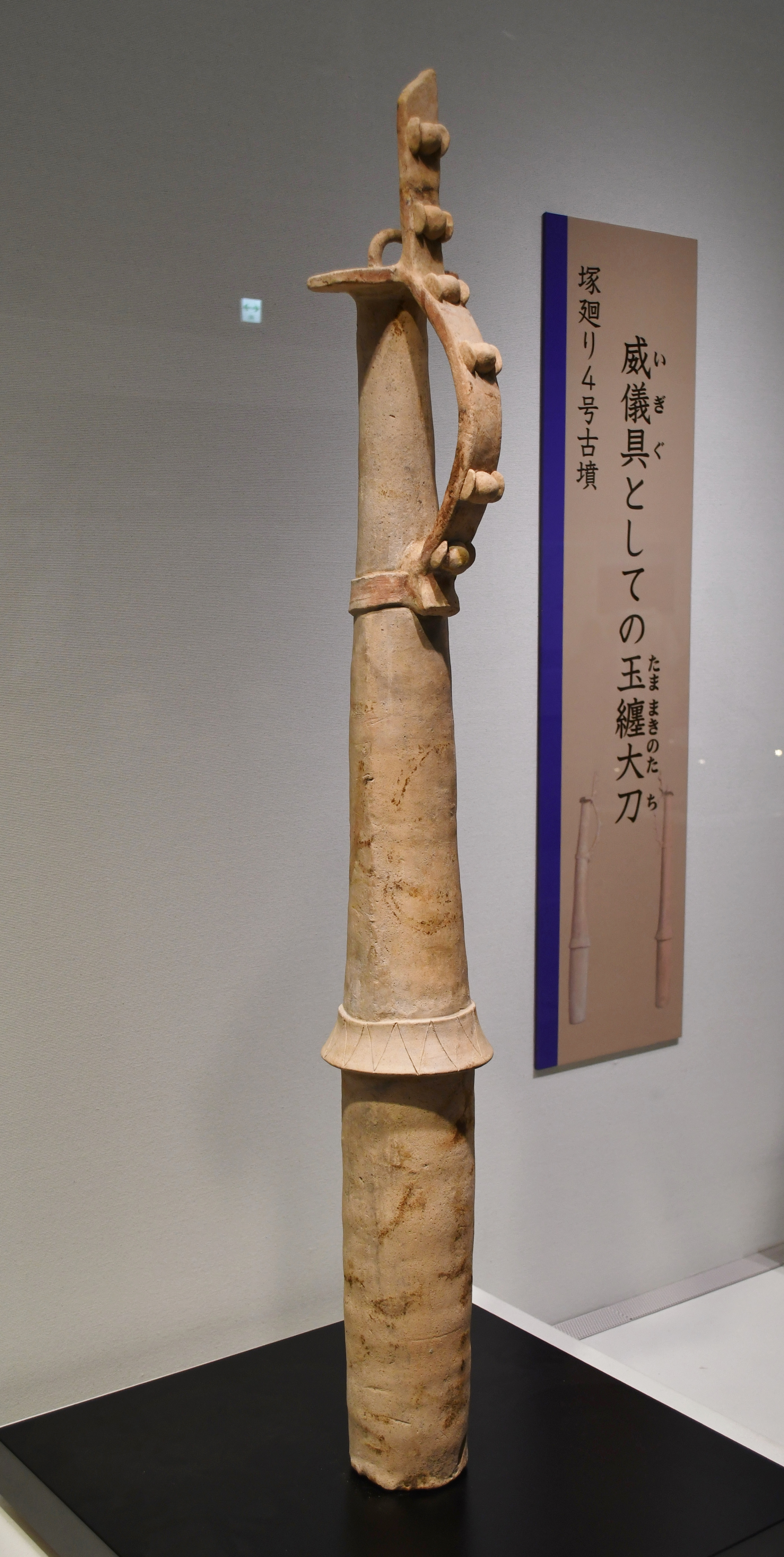
Sword

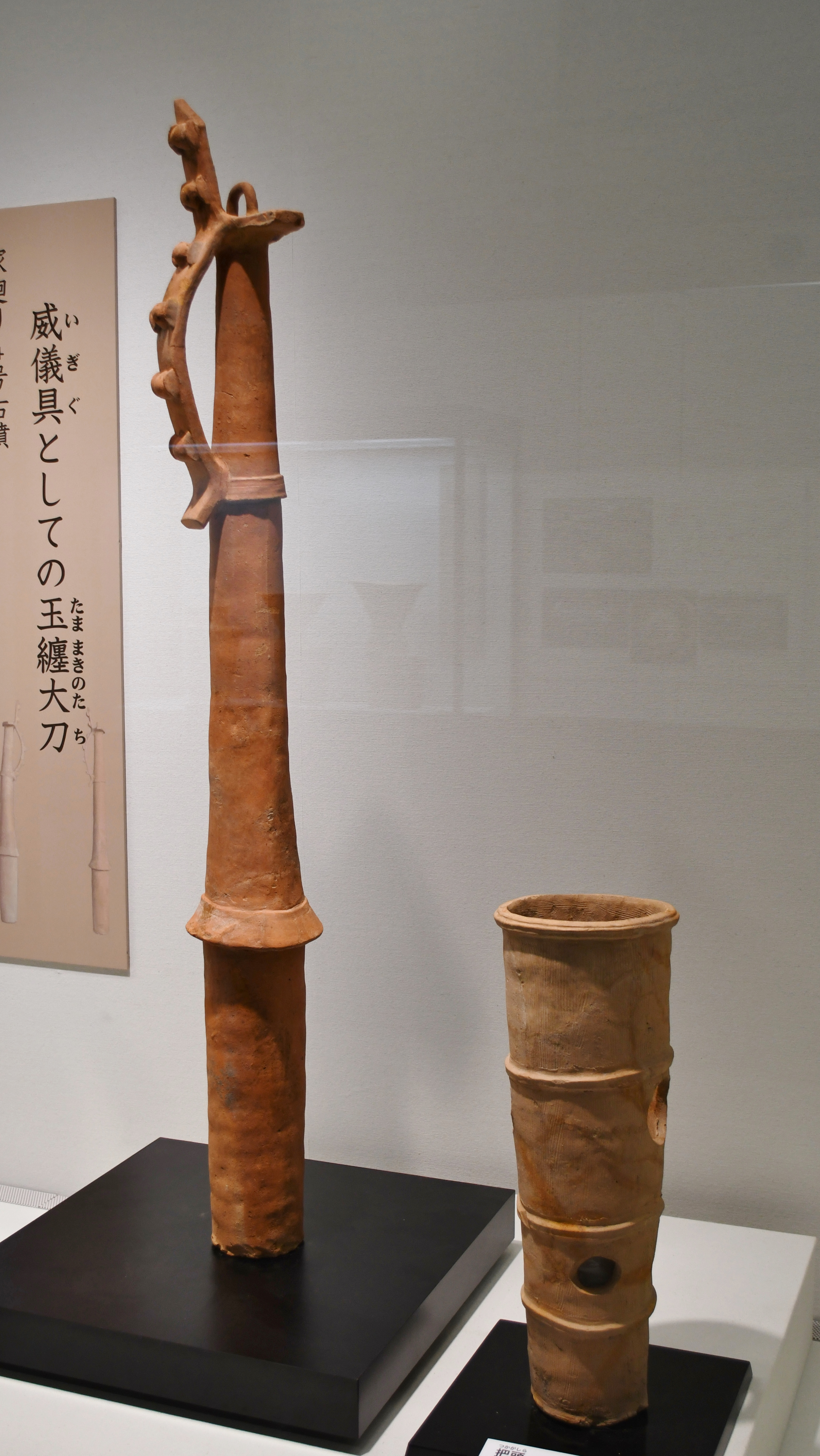
Sword

List of Tsukamawari Kofun cluster
Name	Scale	Shape	Location	Remarks
Kofun No. 1	26.1m	Scallop	Approx 300m NNW of Kofun No.4	Leveled
Kofun No. 2	24m	Scallop	Approx 300m NW of Kofun No.4	Leveled
Kofun No. 3	—	Scallop	N of Kofun No.4	Partially preserved
Kofun No. 4	22.5m	Scallop		Restored, Prefectural Historic Site
Kofun No. 5	16m	—	Approx 90m SSW of Kofun No.4	Leveled
Kofun No. 6	19m	—	Approx 290m NW of Kofun No.4; Immediately S of No.2	Leveled
Kofun No. 7	20m	Circular	Approx 200m NNW of Kofun No.4	Leveled
Kofun No. 8	—	—		Leveled
Kofun No. 9	—	—		Leveled
Kofun No. 10	—	Scallop	beneath the surface in an area adjacent to the S of Kofun No. 4	Backfilled and preserved
Kofun No. 11	16.1m	Circular	beneath the surface in an area adjacent to the SW of Kofun No. 4	Backfilled and preserved
Kofun No. 12	9.5m	Circular	beneath the surface in an area adjacent to the W of Kofun No. 4	Backfilled and preserved
Kofun No. 13	—	Circular	beneath the surface in an area adjacent to the NW of Kofun No. 4	Backfilled and preserved

The tumulus cluster is approximately 2.1 kilometers northeast of Ryūmai Station on the Tōbu Railway Tobu Koizumi Line.

== See also ==
- List of Historic Sites of Japan (Gunma)
