= Sōja Futagoyama Kofun =

Burial mound in Japan

- 総社二子山古墳 (Japanese)
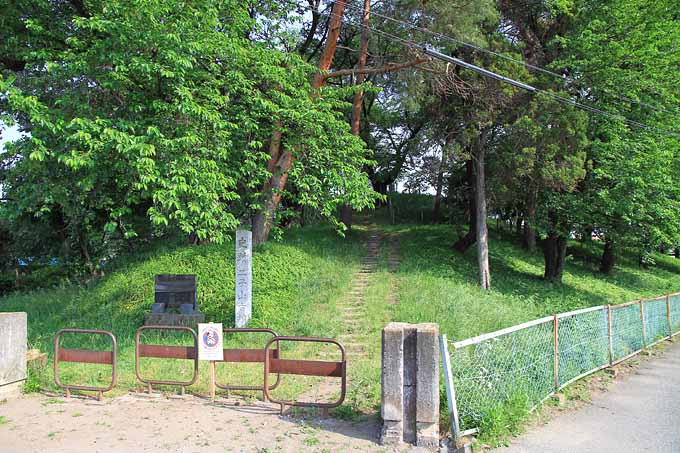
- Sōja Futagoyama Kofun

- Sōja Futagoyama Kofun Sōja Futagoyama Kofun (Japan)
- 36°24′41″N 139°2′5.3″E
- Type: kofun
- Periods: Kofun period
- Location: 368 Ueno, Sōja-chō, Maebashi-shi, Gunma-ken
- Region: Kantō region

History
- Built: late 6th century

Site notes
- Public access: Yes (Park)
- National Historic Site of Japan 総社古墳群分布図

Sōja Futagoyama Kofun (総社二子山古墳) is a Kofun period burial mound located in what is now the city of Maebashi, Gunma Prefecture in the northern Kantō region of Japan. It was designated a National Historic Site of Japan in 1927, and became part of the expanded Sōja Kofun Cluster designation in 2024. It is also sometimes referred to as the Dantaiyama Kofun (男体山古墳).

== Overview ==
Sōja Futagoyama Kofun is a zenpō-kōen-fun (前方後円墳), which is shaped like a keyhole, having one square end and one circular end, when viewed from above. The tumulus is located on a plain near the southeastern slopes of Mount Haruna, and is one of a cluster of kofun tumuli in the area. It has a total length of 89.9 meters and was built in two tiers, orientated to the west. The surface was originally covered in fukiishi with rows of cylindrical haniwa. From the topography of the site, it is believed that the tumulus was surrounded by a moat, although this has not yet been confirmed via archaeological excavation. Although the detailed structure of the mound has not been investigated yet, it is known to have two lateral burial chambers, one in the posterior circular portion and one in the anterior rectangular portion, but with differing construction methods. The burial chamber in the circular portion is 9.4 meters long by 3.4 meters wide and has walls made of large dressed blocked of andesite, although the ceiling has collapsed. This is one of then largest burial chambers found in Gunma Prefecture. The one in the rectangular portion is lined with natural stones and is 8.76 meters long by 2.22 meters wide. From the stonework, it is estimated that this tumulus was built in the late 6th century AD, or towards the end of the Kofun period.

The tomb was opened in then mid-Edo period, and many grave goods including bronze and iron swords, magatama beads, gold earrings, long-necked iron jars, and Sue ware earthenware pottery were recovered from the anterior burial chamber. These were carefully recorded by Maebashi Domain. A few of these artifacts are preserved at the Tokyo National Museum, but most have been lost over the years. These include at least one sword with a silver hilt, which is mentioned in the Edo period records, but whose whereabouts are unknown.

In 1874, in response to a Meiji government project to find the grave of the legendary Toyoki-irihiko no Mikoto, the first son of Emperor Sujin, and the founder of Keno Province mentioned in the Nara period Nihon Shoki chronicle, Gunma Prefecture officially submitted the Sōja Futagoyama Kofun as a possible candidate. This petition was initially granted and the government appointed an official tombmaster and tombkeeper. However, in 1876 (Meiji 9), a dispute arose within the village over salaries from the Imperial Household Ministry, leading to both officials resigning. Subsequently, the designation was rescinded due to lack of evidence, and due to publicity received by findings at the Maefutago Kofun which was believed at the time to have a better claim.

Overall length
89.9 meters
Posterior circular portion
44 meter diameter x 7.5 meters high, 2-tier
Anterior rectangular portion
61 meters wide x 8 meters high, 2-tier

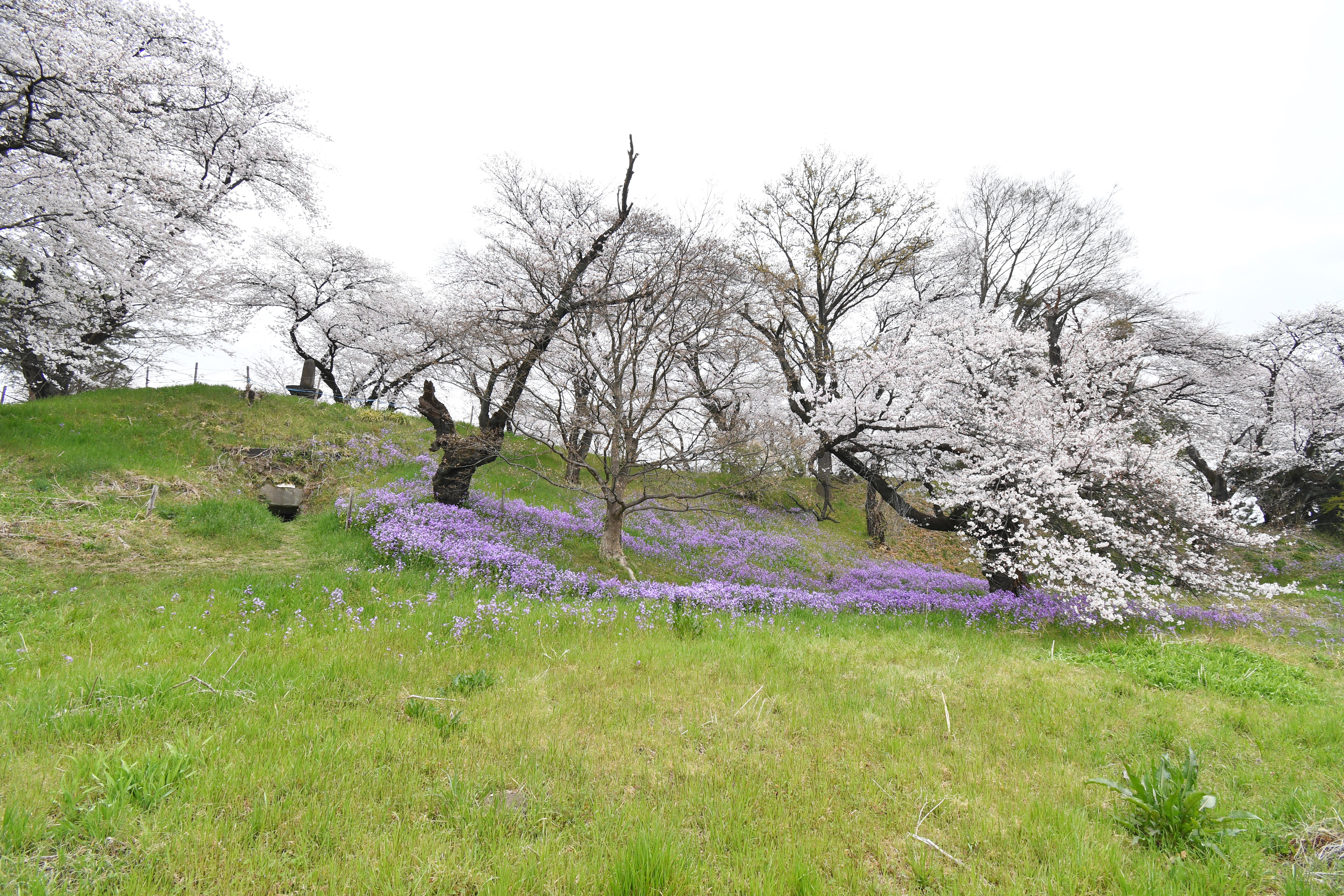
The front part and stone chamber opening are on the left, and the rear circular mound is at the back right.

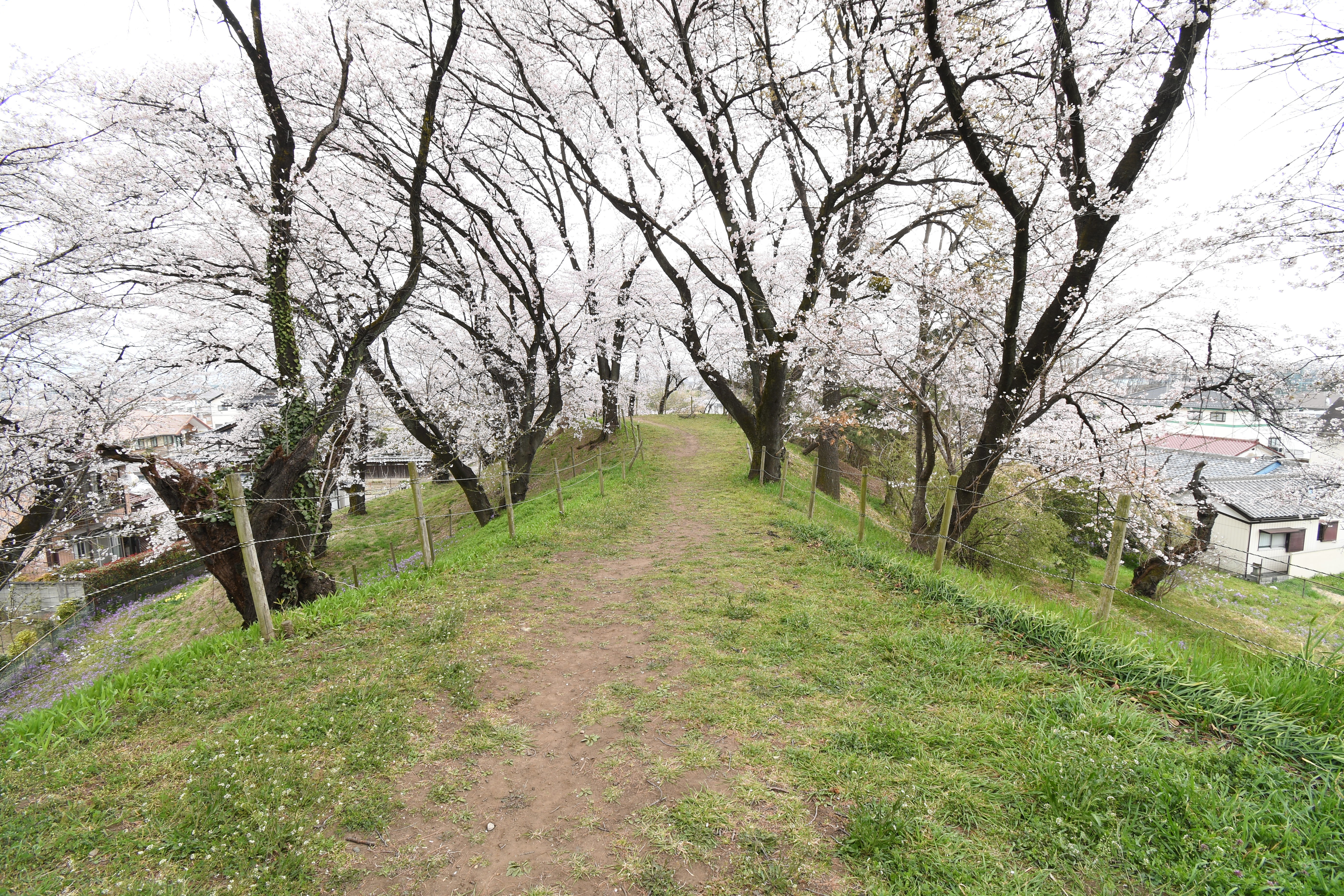
View of the rear circular mound from the front circular mound

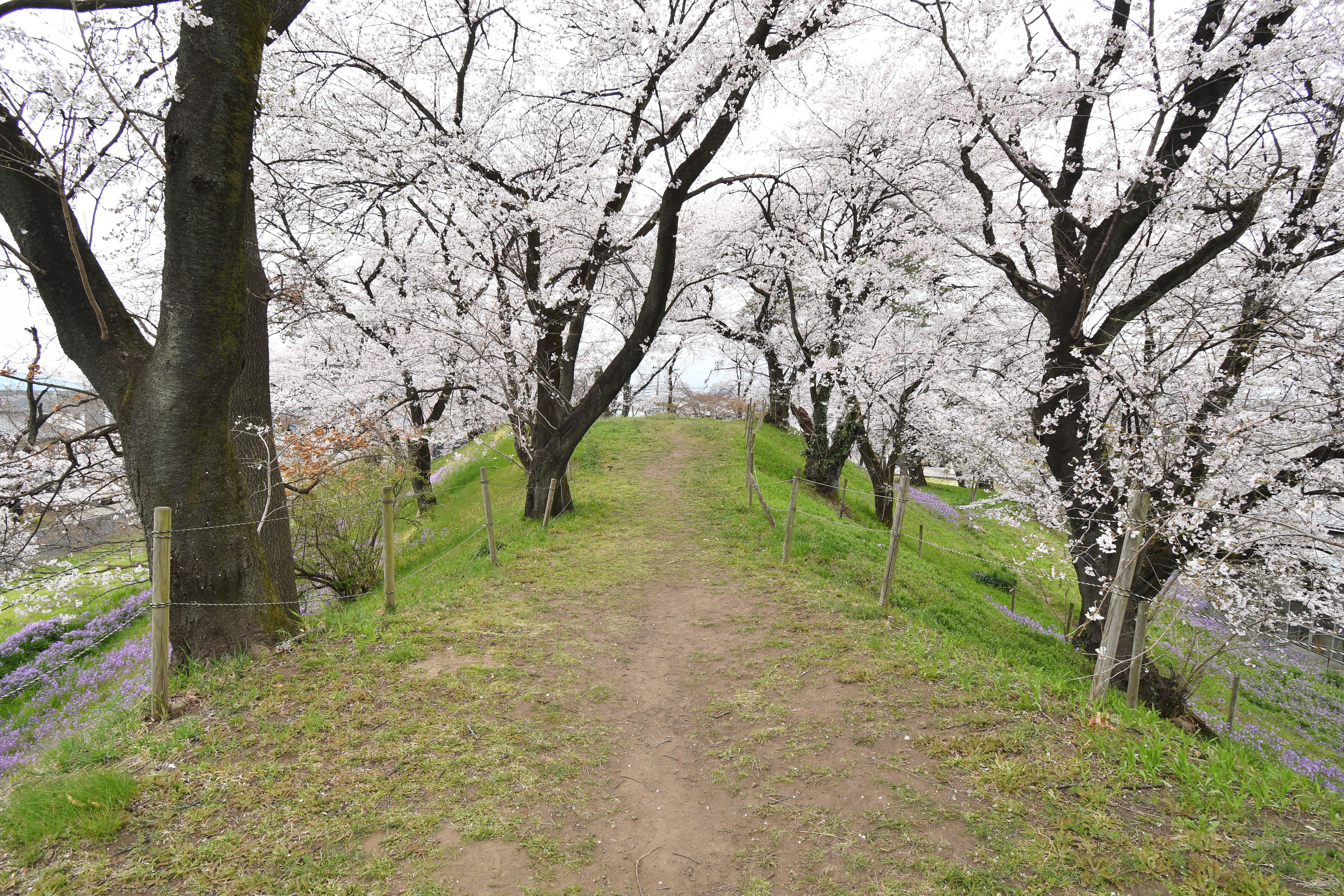
View of the front circular mound from the rear circular mound

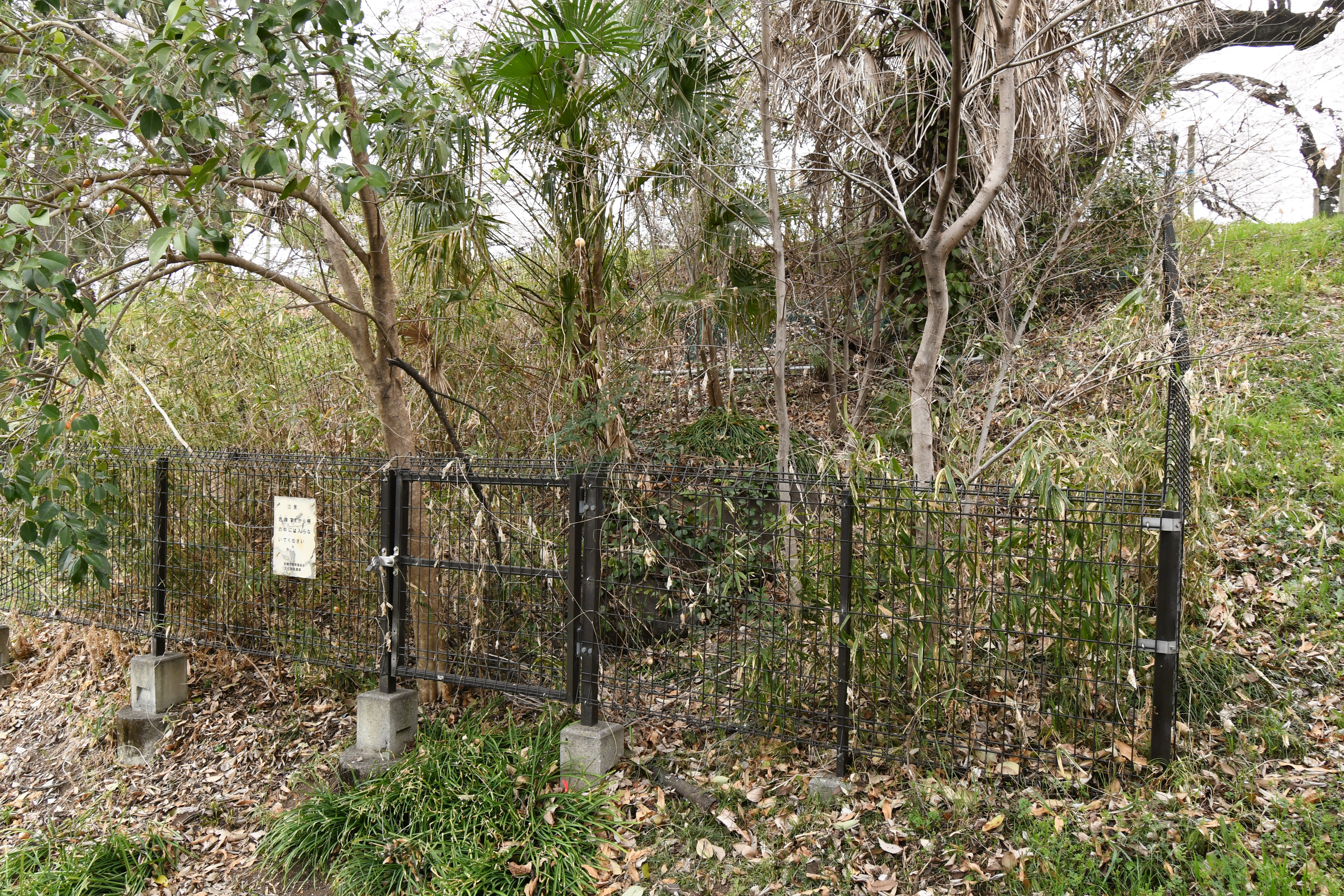
Stone chamber in the rear circular mound

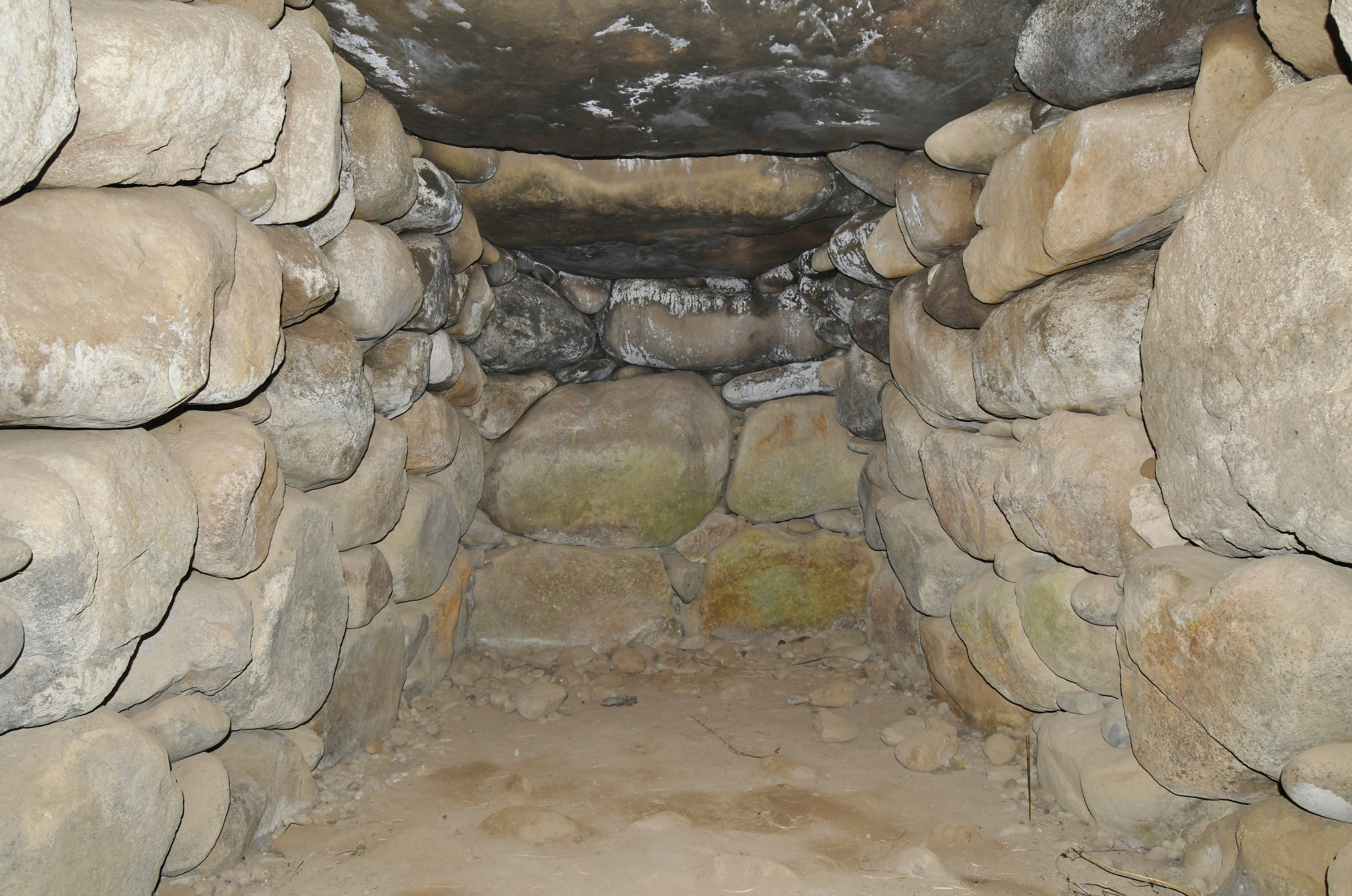
Antechamber in the front circular mound-shaped mound-shaped mound-1 (towards the rear wall)

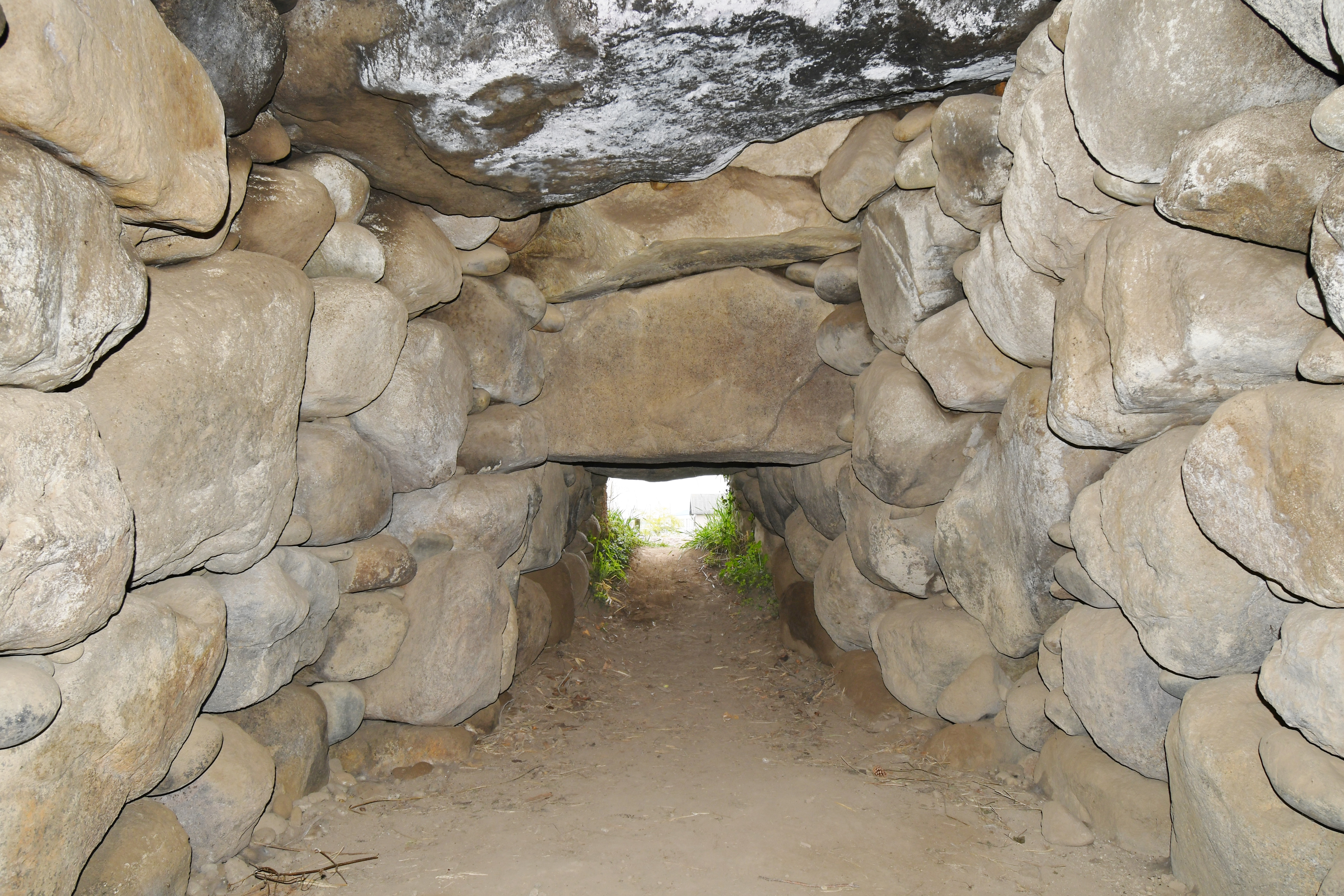
Antechamber in the front circular mound-shaped mound-2 (towards the opening)

== See also ==
- List of Historic Sites of Japan (Gunma)
