= Nakafutago Kofun =

Kofun period burial mound in Takasaki, Japan

- 中二子古墳 (Japanese)
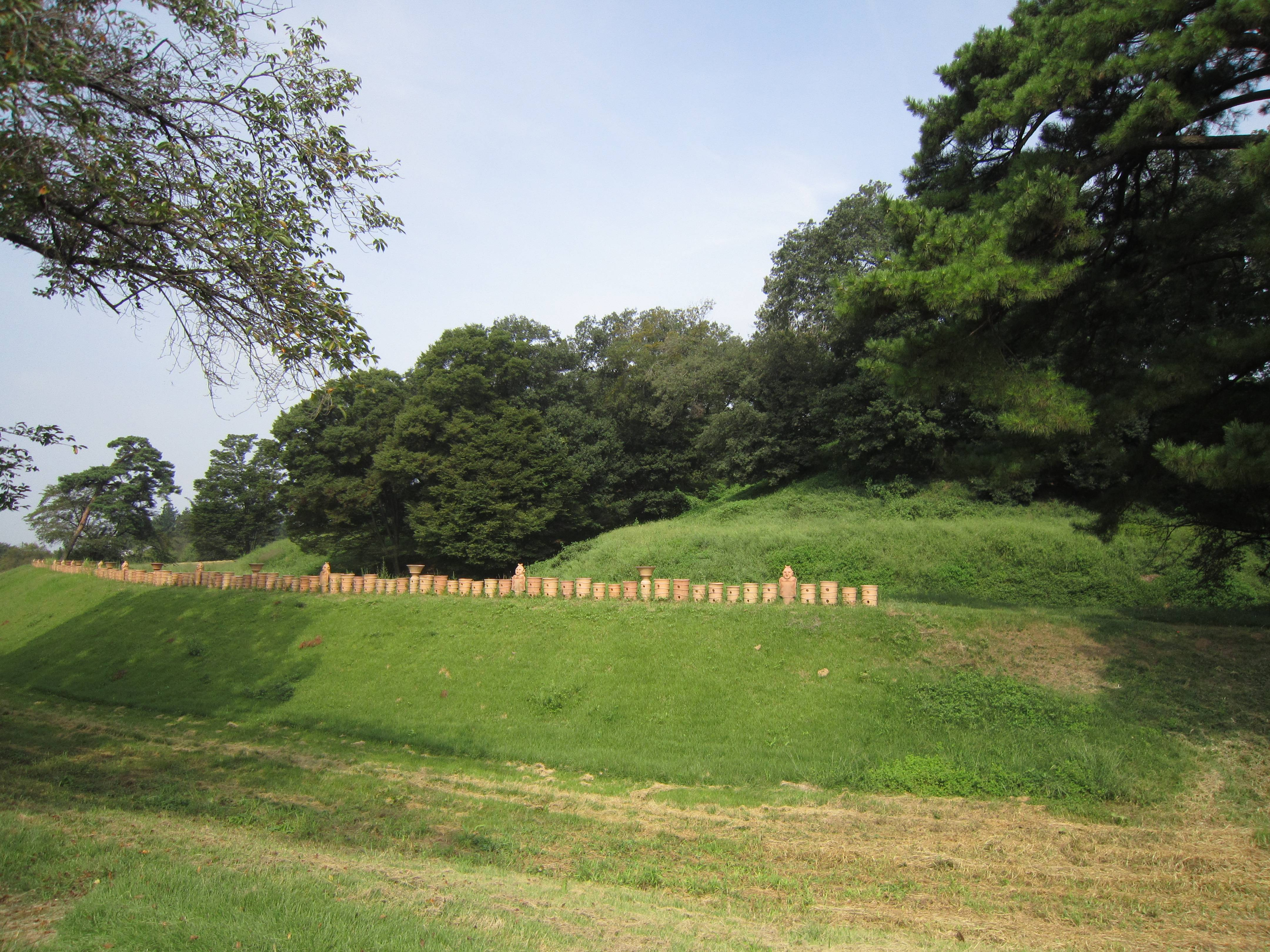
- Nakafutago Kofun

- Nakafutago Kofun Nakafutago Kofun (Japan)
- 36°23′14.3″N 139°11′41.3″E
- Type: kofun
- Periods: Kofun period
- Location: Maebashi, Gunma, Japan
- Region: Kantō region

History
- Built: early 6th century

Site notes
- Public access: Yes (Park)

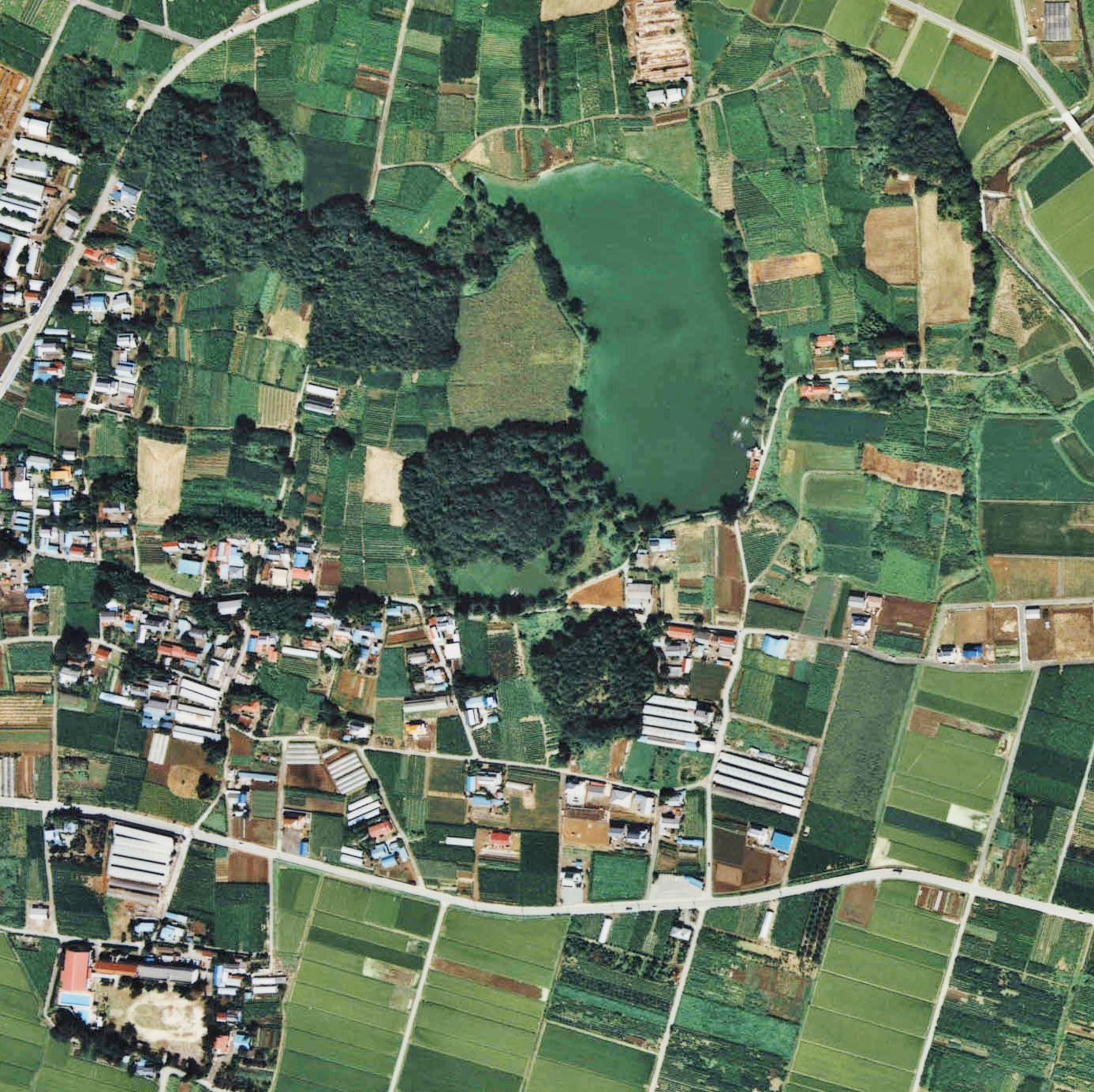
Ōmuro Kofun Cluster

Nakafutago Kofun (中二子古墳) is a Kofun period burial mound located in the Nishi-Ōmuro neighborhood of what is now the city of Takasaki, Gunma Prefecture in the northern Kantō region of Japan. It was designated a National Historic Site of Japan in 1927. It is estimated to have been built around beginning of the 6th century AD and is part of a group of at least six tumuli which were concentrated in the vicinity, forming the Ōmuro Kofun Cluster. Within the Ōmuro Kofun Cluster are also the Maefutago Kofun and the Ushirofutago Kofun, which have a separate National Historic Site designations.

== Overview ==
The tumulus is located on a low hill at the southern foot of Mount Akagi. It is a zenpō-kōen-fun (前方後円墳), which is shaped like a keyhole, having one square end and one circular end, when viewed from above. It is the largest in the Ōmuro Kofun Cluster with a total length of 111 meters, with a posterior circular portion in two tiers and an anterior rectangular portion two tiers, and is orientated to 89 degrees northeast. Part of the mound is carved out of the ground, and only the upper tier was originally covered in fukiishi. Cylindrical, house-shaped and other types of haniwa were also excavated in profusion, and it is estimated that originally over 3000 haniwa were in rows on the mounds. The tumulus is surrounded by a shield-shaped double moat with crossings on the north and west sides. Although excavated in March 1891, no burial chamber was discovered.

Total length
111 meters
Anterior rectangular portion
79 meters wide, 2-tier
Posterior circular portion
66 meter diameter x 15 meters high, 2-tier

The surrounding area is now maintained as Ōmuro Park (大室公園¥¥) with several other kofun and reconstructions of Kofun-period structures forming an archaeological park.

== See also ==
- List of Historic Sites of Japan (Gunma)
