= Sōja Atagoyama Kofun =

Kofun period burial mound in Maebashi, Kantō, Japan

- 総社愛宕山古墳 (Japanese)
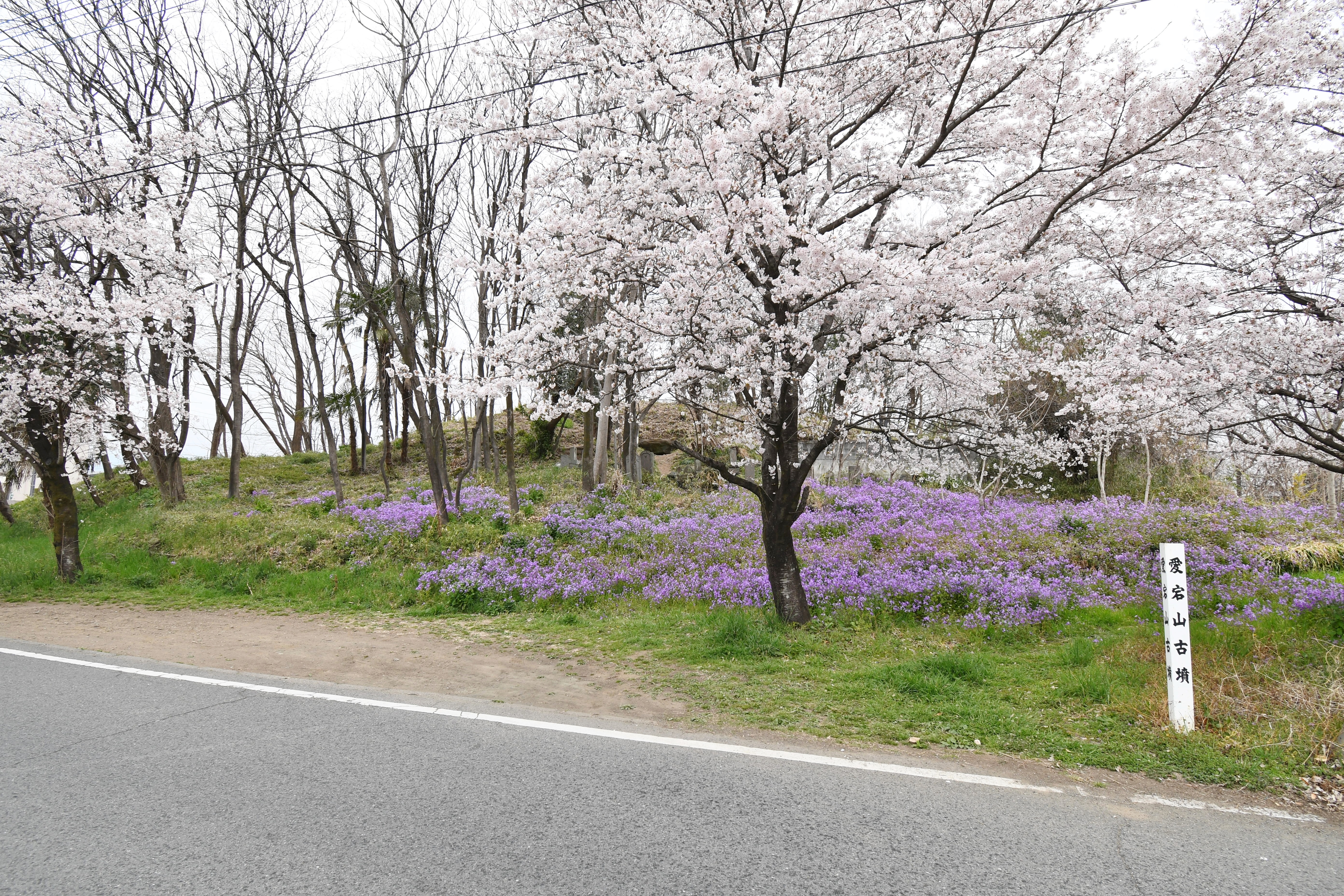
- Sōja Atagoyama Kofun

- Sōja Atagoyama Kofun Sōja Atagoyama Kofun (Japan)
- 36°24′36.4″N 139°02′10.23″E
- Type: kofun
- Periods: Kofun period
- Location: 1763 Sōja, Sōja-chō, Maebashi-shi, Gunma-ken
- Region: Kantō region

Site notes
- Public access: Yes (no public facilities)
- National Historic Site of Japan 総社古墳群分布図

The Sōja Atagoyama Kofun (総社愛宕山古墳) is a square-shaped (hōfun (方墳)) Kofun period burial mound located in what is now the Sōja neighborhood of the city of Maebashi, Gunma Prefecture in the northern Kantō region of Japan. The site was designated a National Historic Site of Japan in 2024, as part of the Sōja Kofun Cluster

== Overview ==
The Akagoyama Kofun is located in the northwestern part of Maebashi city, over the Tone River at the southeastern foot of Mount Haruna in central Gunma Prefecture. It is located in an area with a heavy concentration of kofun burial mounds. The tumulus is square (presumably circular at one time), measuring 56 meters on each side and 8.5 meters high. The mound is built in at least three tiers (presumably two tiers at one time). Fukiishi have been found on the exterior of the mound, but no haniwa have been found. The mound is surrounded by a moat. The burial chamber is a horizontal stone chamber with an opening facing south. A hollowed-out, house-shaped stone coffin made of tuff is placed inside. The interior of the chamber has not yet been investigated, so details about any surviving grave goods are unknown. The chamber is approximately 9.3 meters long with a seven meter antechamber, 2.8 meters high. The chamber is made of natural megaliths, some of which have been reworked. The main axis of the sarcophagus is perpendicular to the main axis of the chamber. The sarcophagus measures 2.22 meters long, 1.18 meters wide, and 1.02 meters high, with the lid measuring 2.26 meters long, 1.23 meters wide, and 0.50 meters high. Two pairs of rope-hanging protrusions are carved into the long sides of the lid.

The chamber is estimated to have been built around the first half of the 7th century, towards the end of the Kofun period. In the Sōja Kofun Group, it follows Futagoyama Kofun and precedes Hōtōzan Kofun.

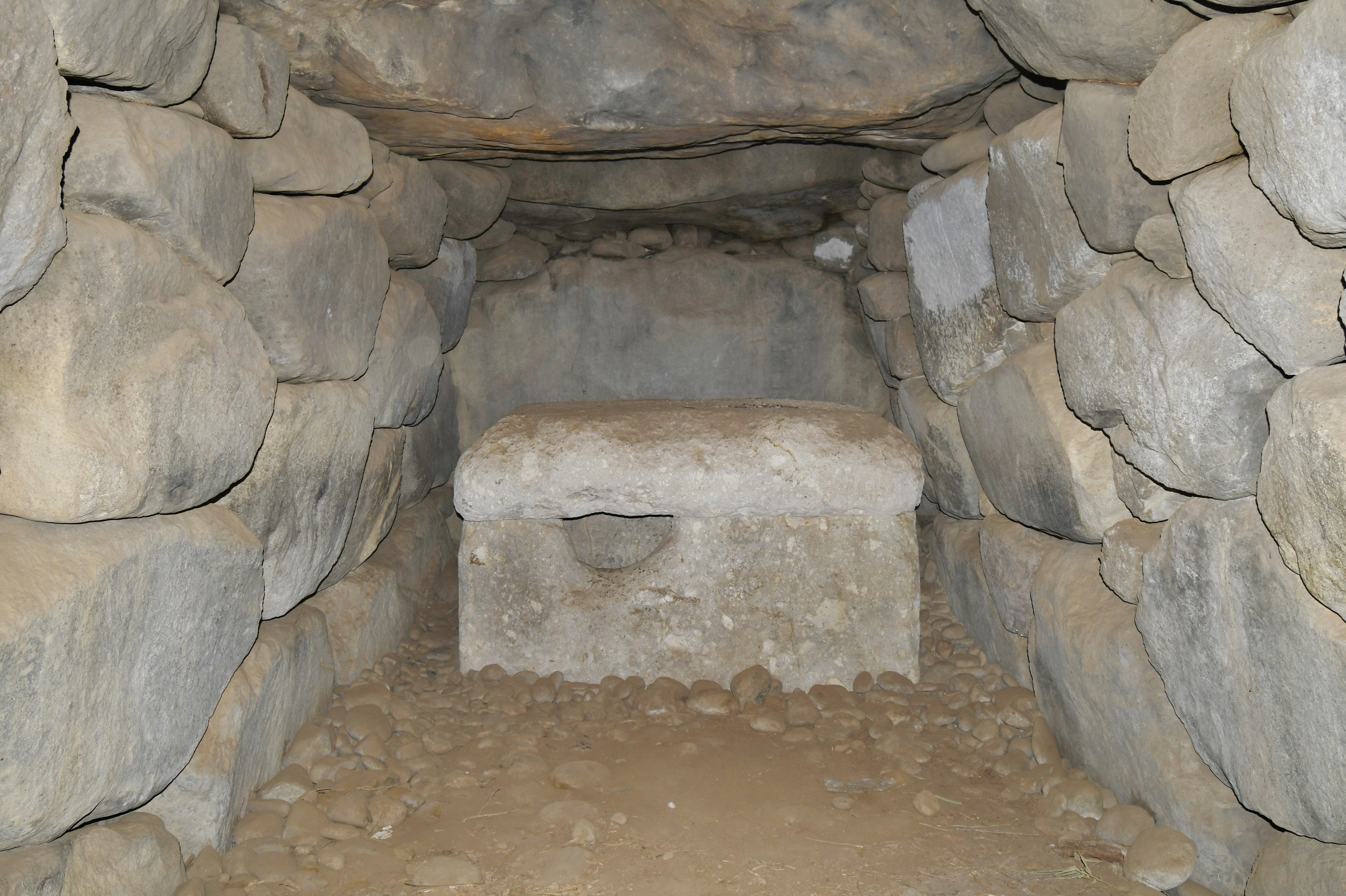
Antechamber (towards the back wall)

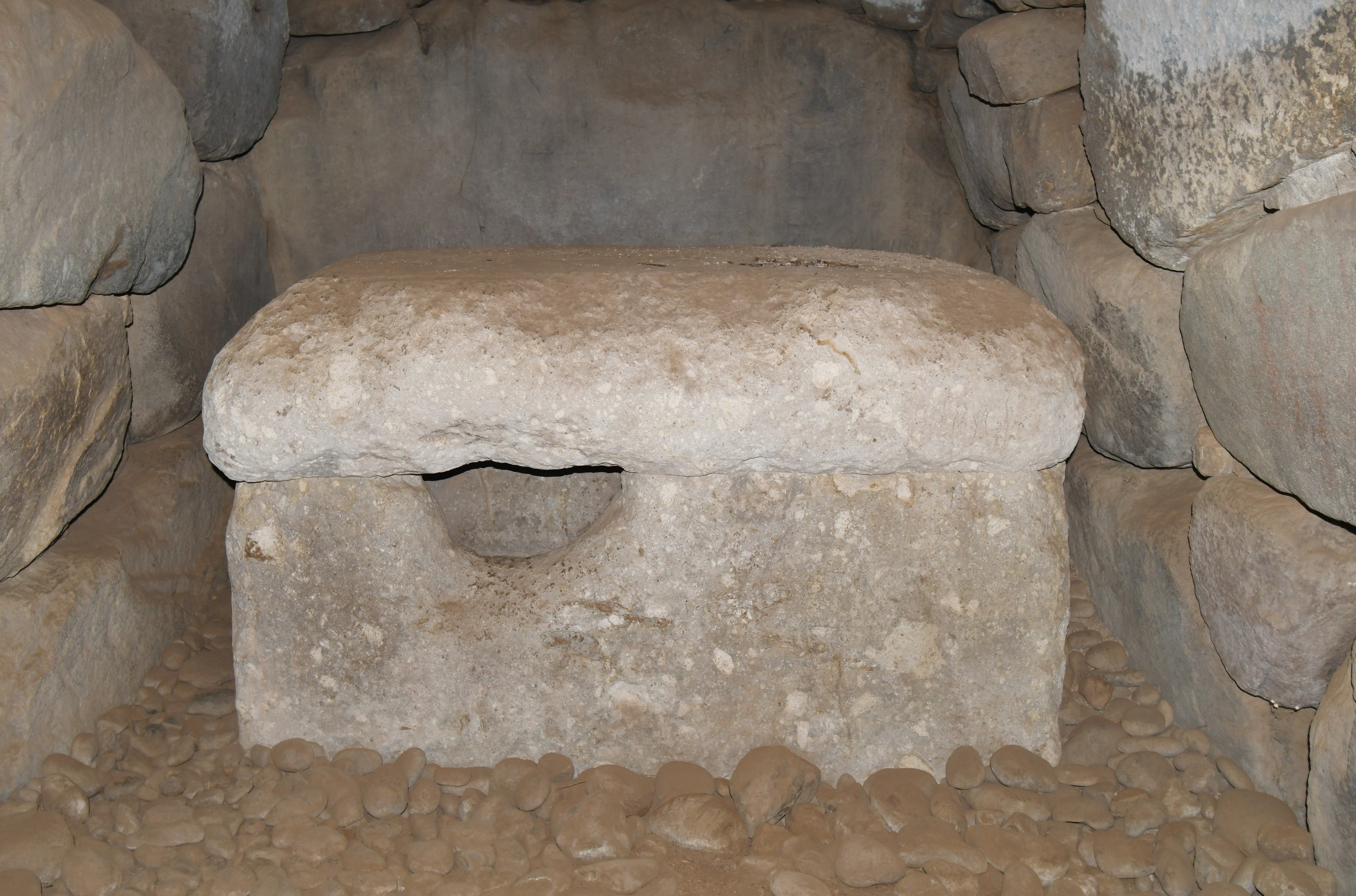
House-shaped sarcophagus in the antechamber

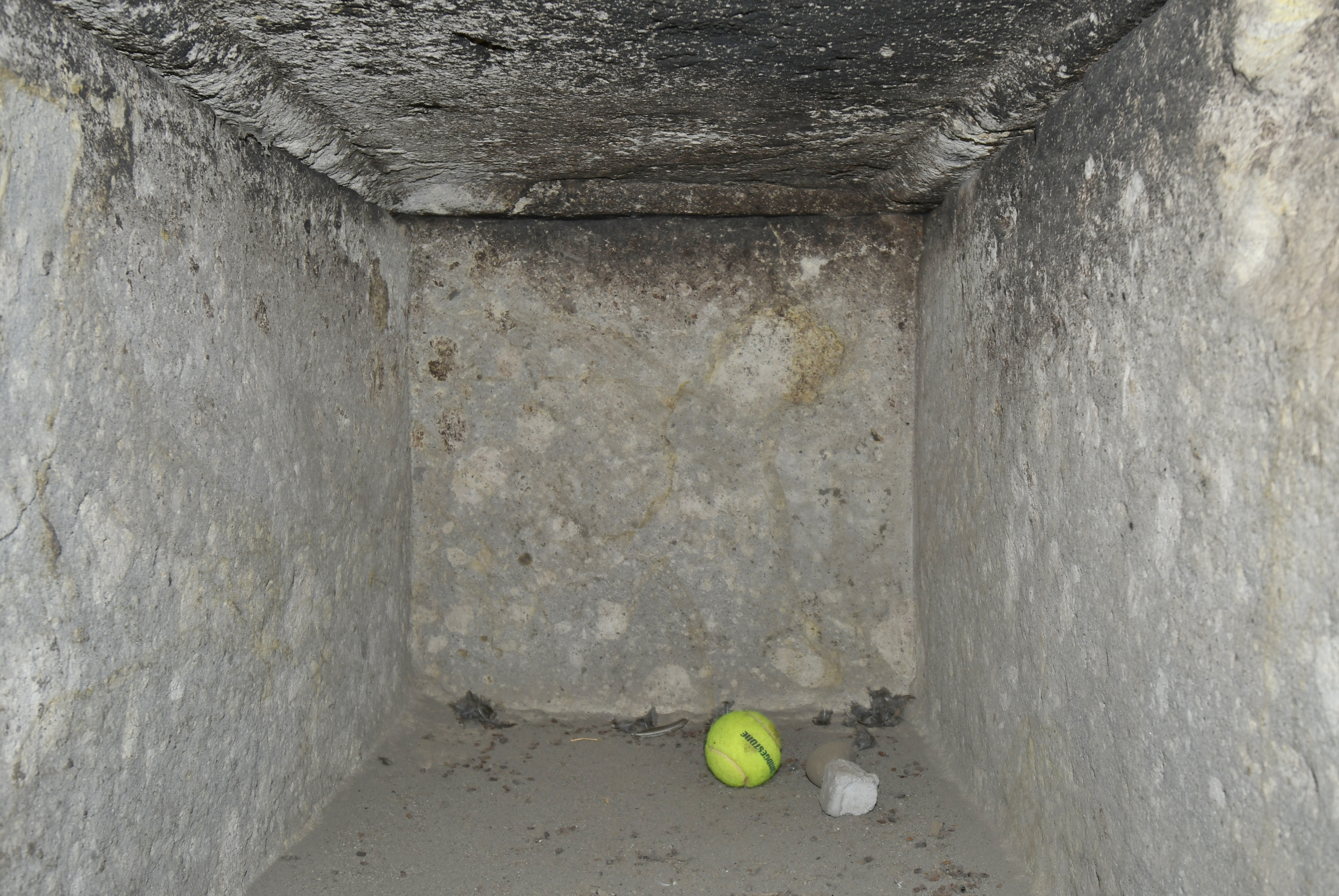
Inside the house-shaped sarcophagus

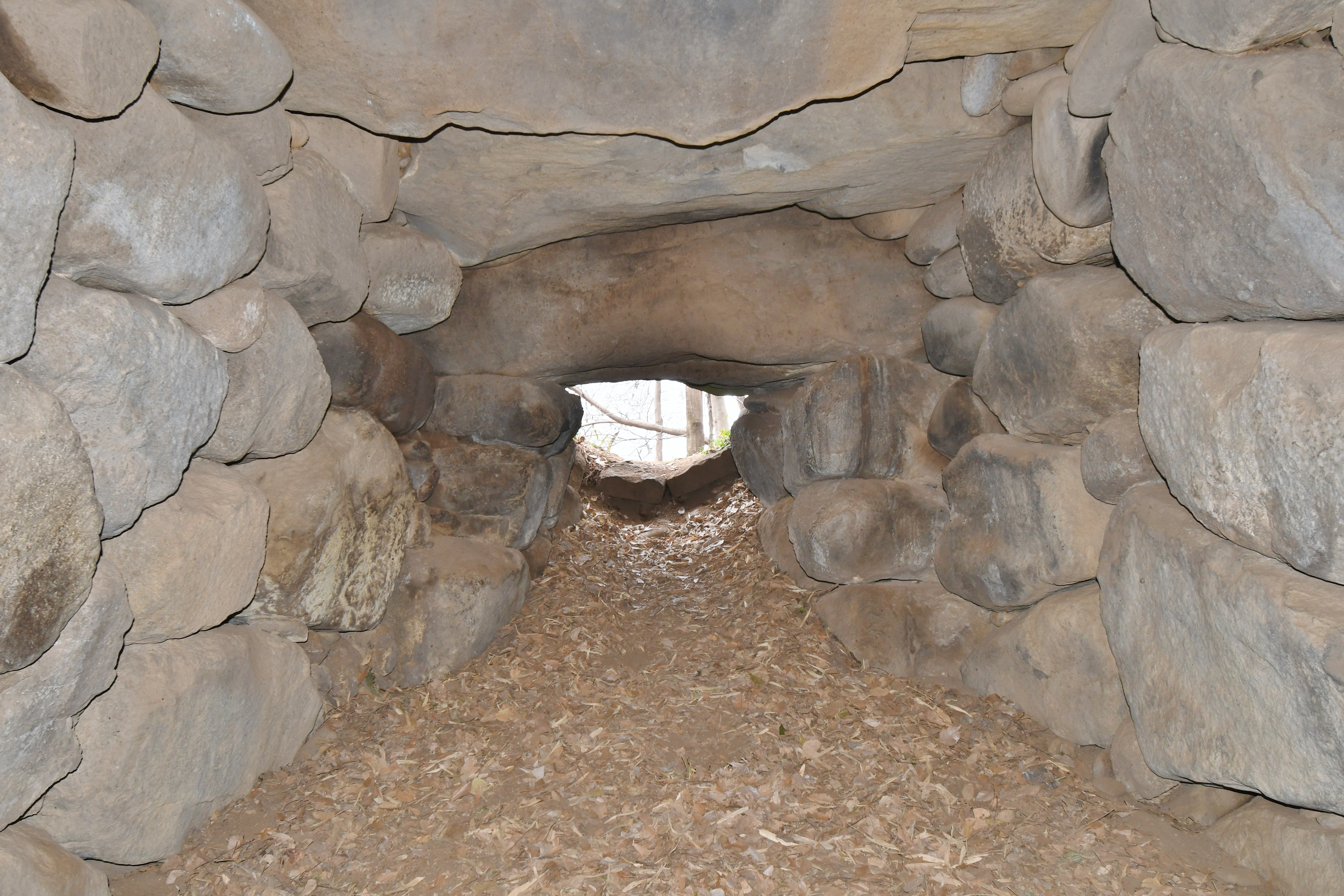
Antechamber (towards the opening)

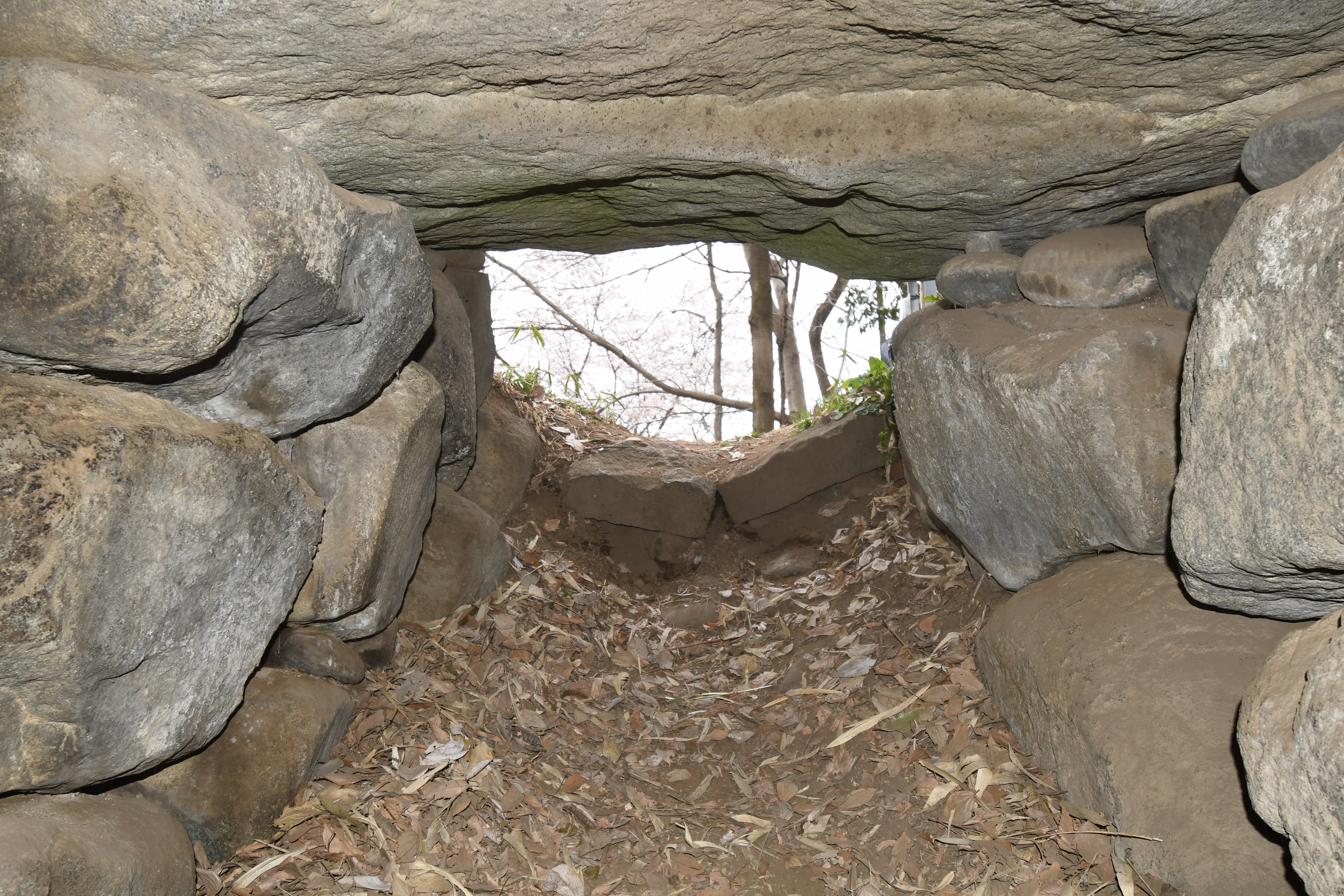
Entrance (towards the opening)

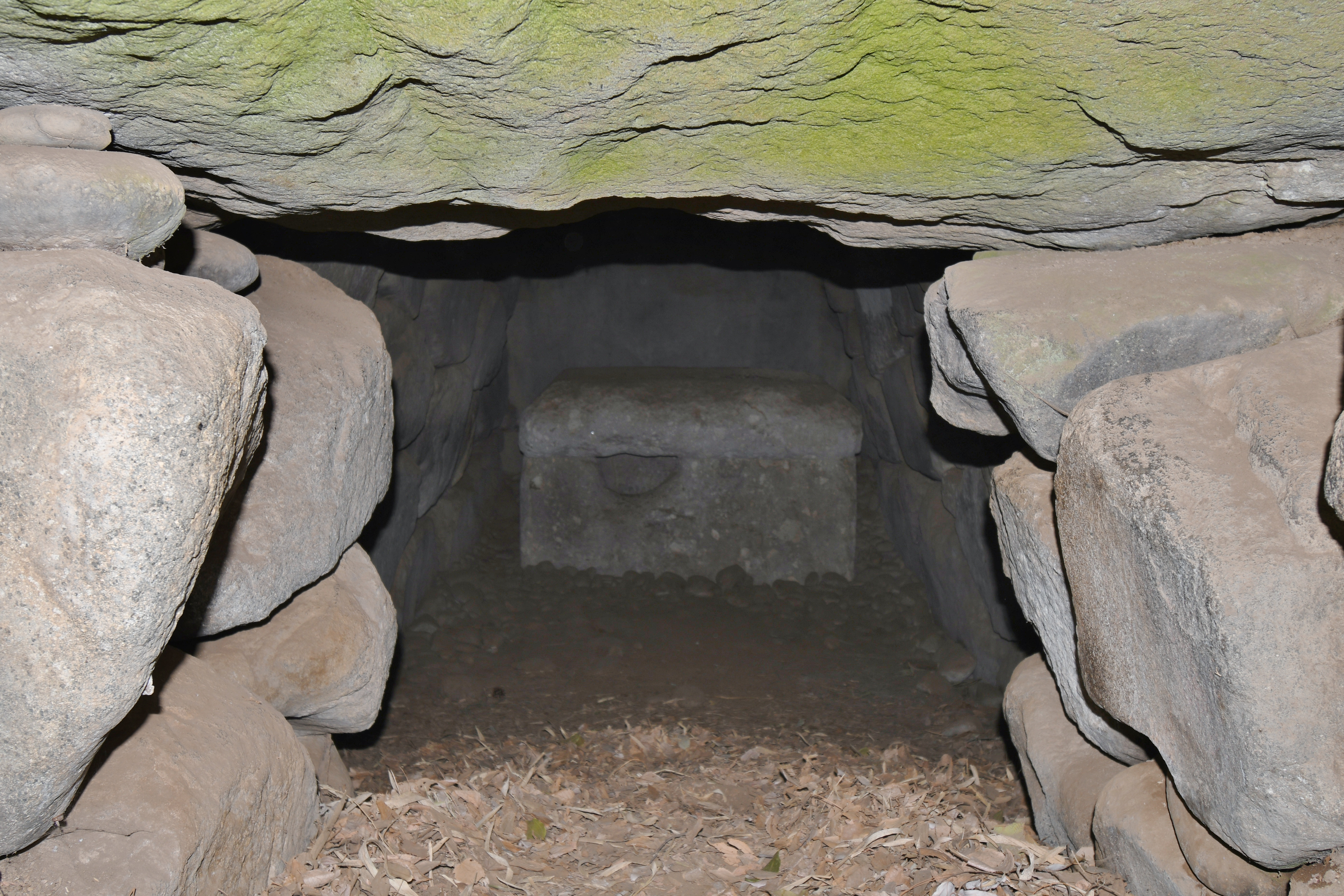
Entrance (towards the antechamber)

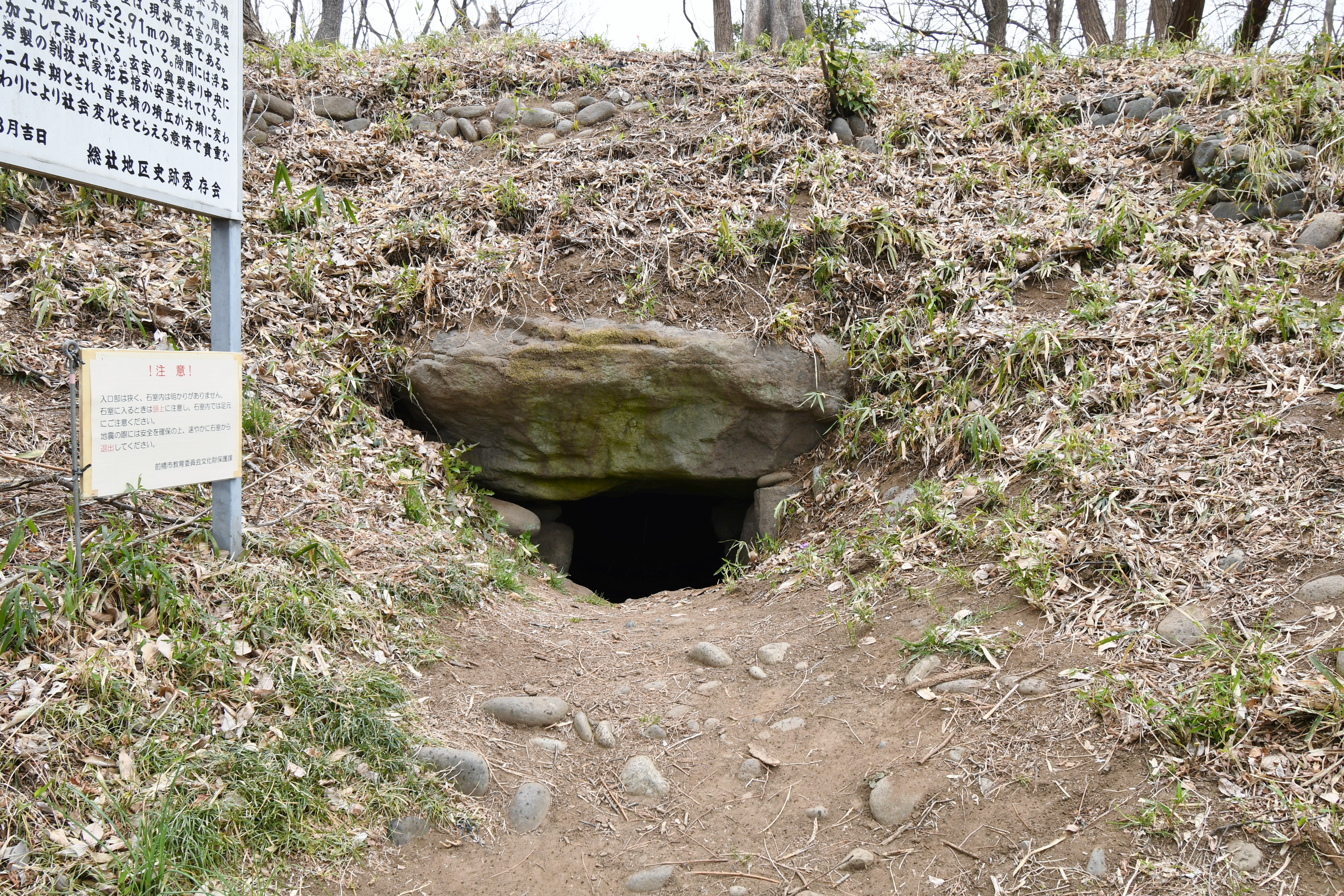
Opening

== See also ==
- List of Historic Sites of Japan (Gunma)
