= Sōja Kofun Cluster =

Kofun period burial mound cluster in Maebashi, Kantō, Japan

- 総社古墳群 (Japanese)
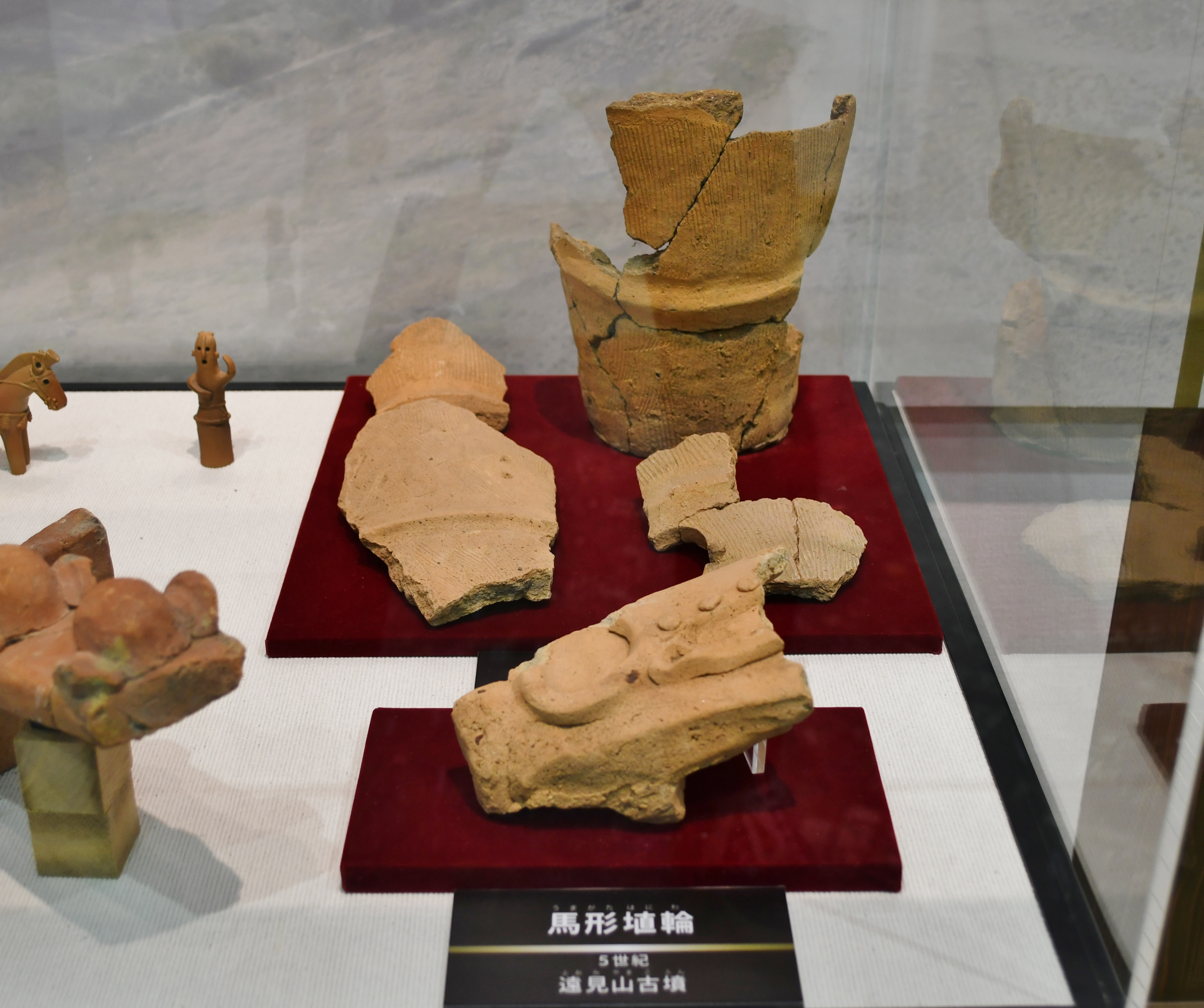
- Haniwa from the Tōmiyama Kofun

- Sōja Kofun Cluster Sōja Kofun Cluster (Japan)
- 36°24′34.73″N 139°2′37.45″E
- Type: kofun
- Periods: Kofun period
- Location: Maebashi, Gunma, Japan
- Region: Kantō region

Site notes
- Public access: Yes (no public facilities)
- National Historic Site of Japan 総社古墳群分布図

The Sōja Kofun Cluster (総社古墳群) is a group of Kofun period burial mounds located in what is now the Sōja neighborhood of the city of Maebashi, Gunma Prefecture in the northern Kantō region of Japan. Five of the kofun in this group were collectively designated a National Historic Site of Japan in 2024.

== Overview ==
The Sōja Kofun Cluster is located in the northwestern part of Maebashi city, on the west bank of the Tone River at the southeastern foot of Mount Haruna in central Gunma Prefecture. The burial mounds were constructed in the first half of the 7th century, towards the end of the Kofun period, and are the graves of powerful families who ruled the region from the late 5th century to the late 7th century. The group consists of:

Sōja Kofun Cluster'
Area	Name	Type	Lenth	Date	HS status
N	Tōmiyama Kofun (遠見山古墳)	Zenpokoenfun	88 meters	late 5c	NHS
S	Ōyama Kofun (王山古墳)	Zenpokoenfun	76 meters	early 6c	CHS
S	Ōkawaharayama Kofun (王河原山古墳)	Zenpokoenfun			（destroyed）
N	Sōja Futagoyama Kofun (総社二子山古墳)	Zenpokoenfun	90 meters	late 6c	NHS
N	Sōja Atagoyama Kofun (総社愛宕山古墳)]	Square	56 meters	mid-7c	NHS
N	Hōtōzan Kofun (宝塔山古墳)	Square	66 meters	mid-7c	NHS
N	Jaketsuzan Kofun (蛇穴山古墳)	Square	44 meters	mid-7c	NHS

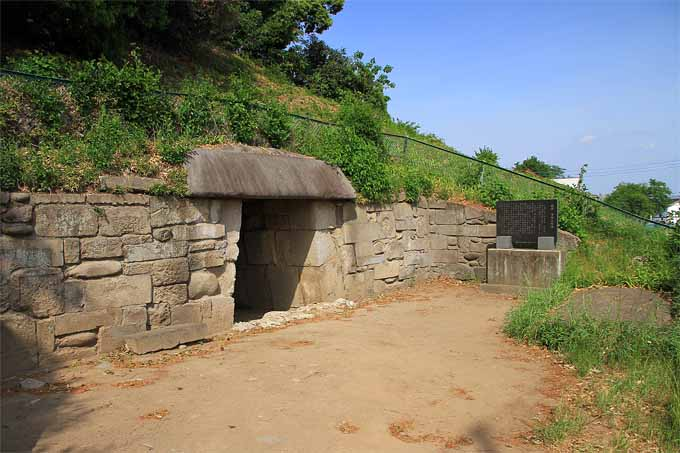
Hōtōzan Kofun

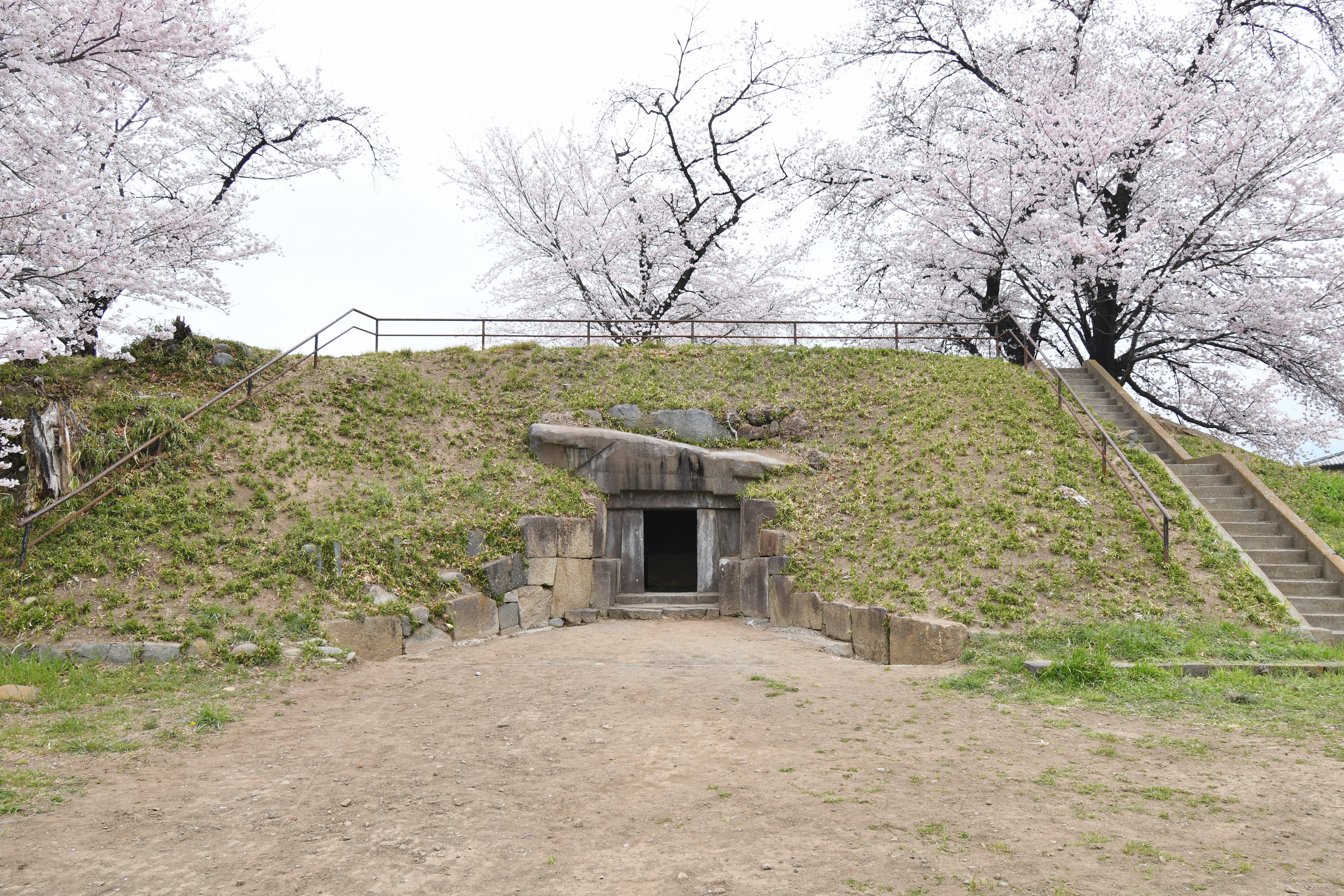
Jaketsuzan Kofun

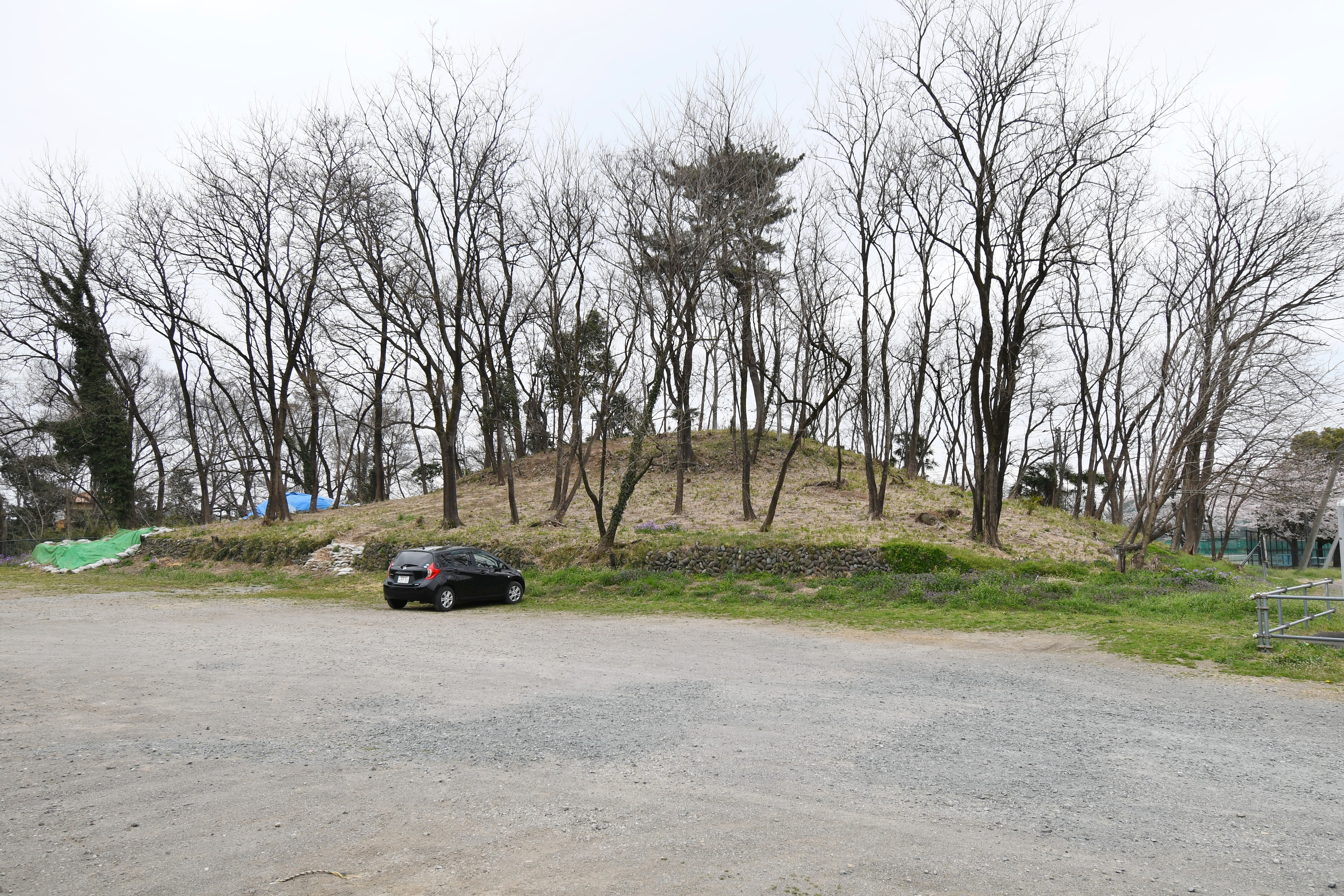
Sōja Atagoyama Kofun

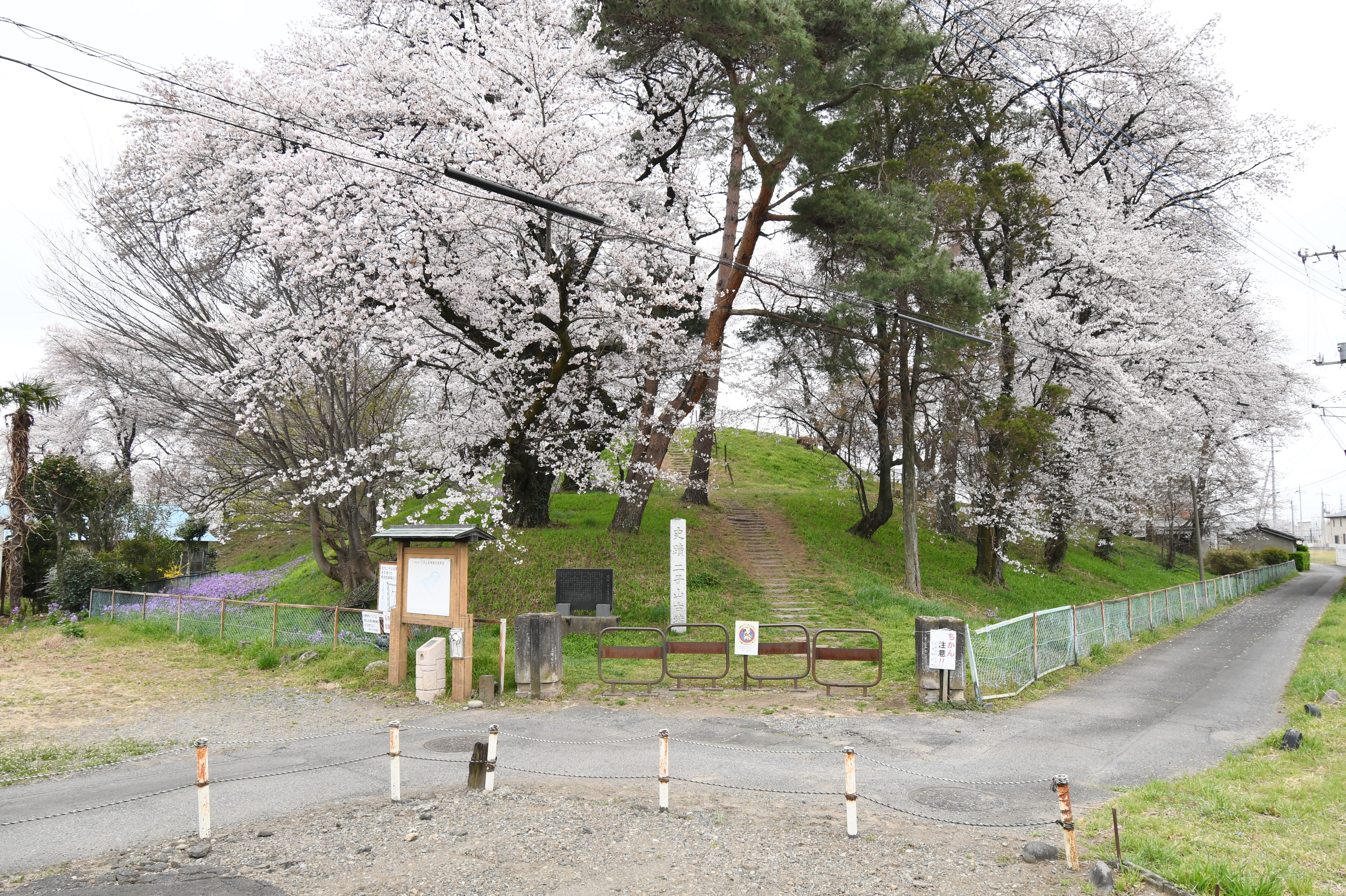
Sōja Futagoyama Kofun

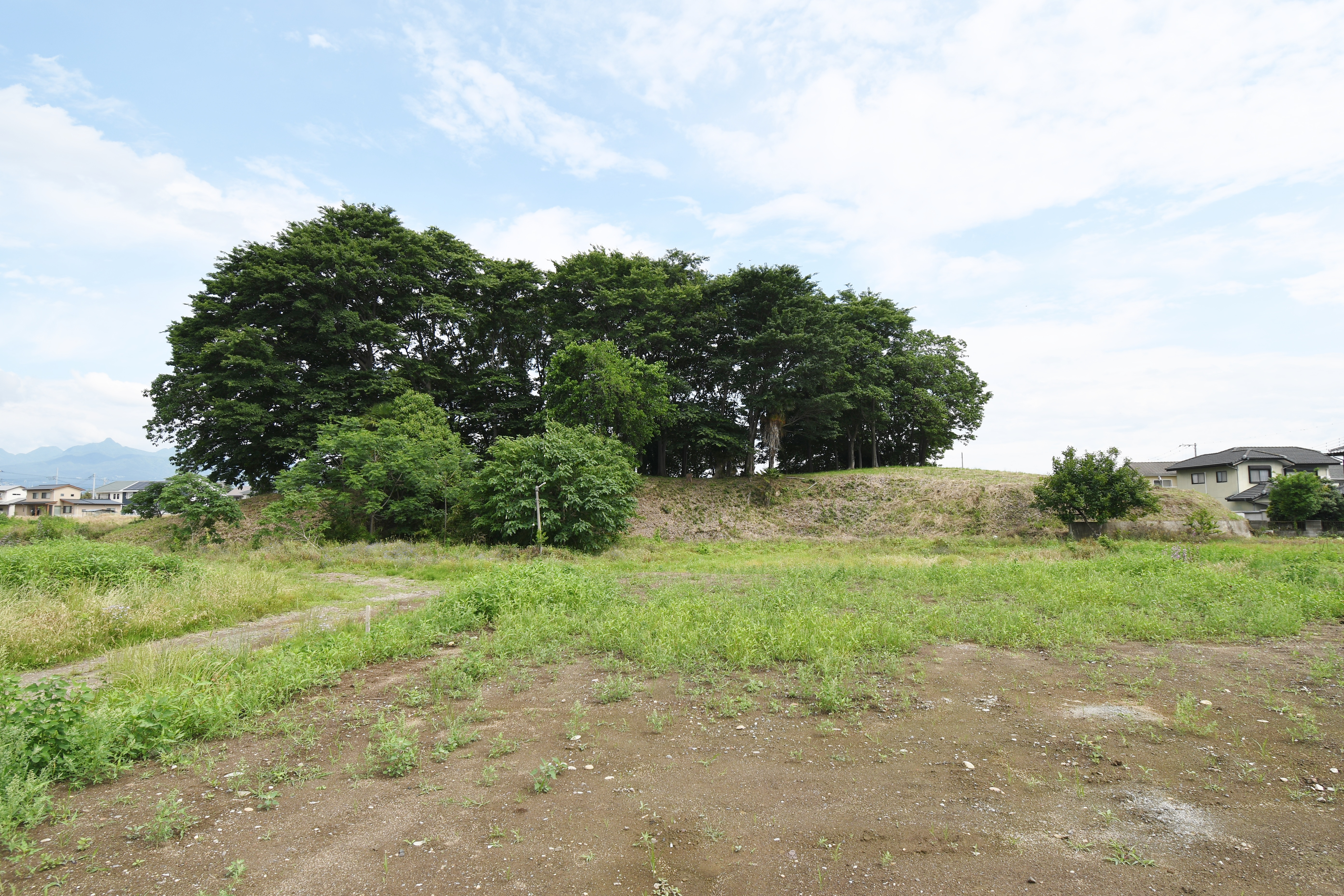
Tōmiyama Kofun

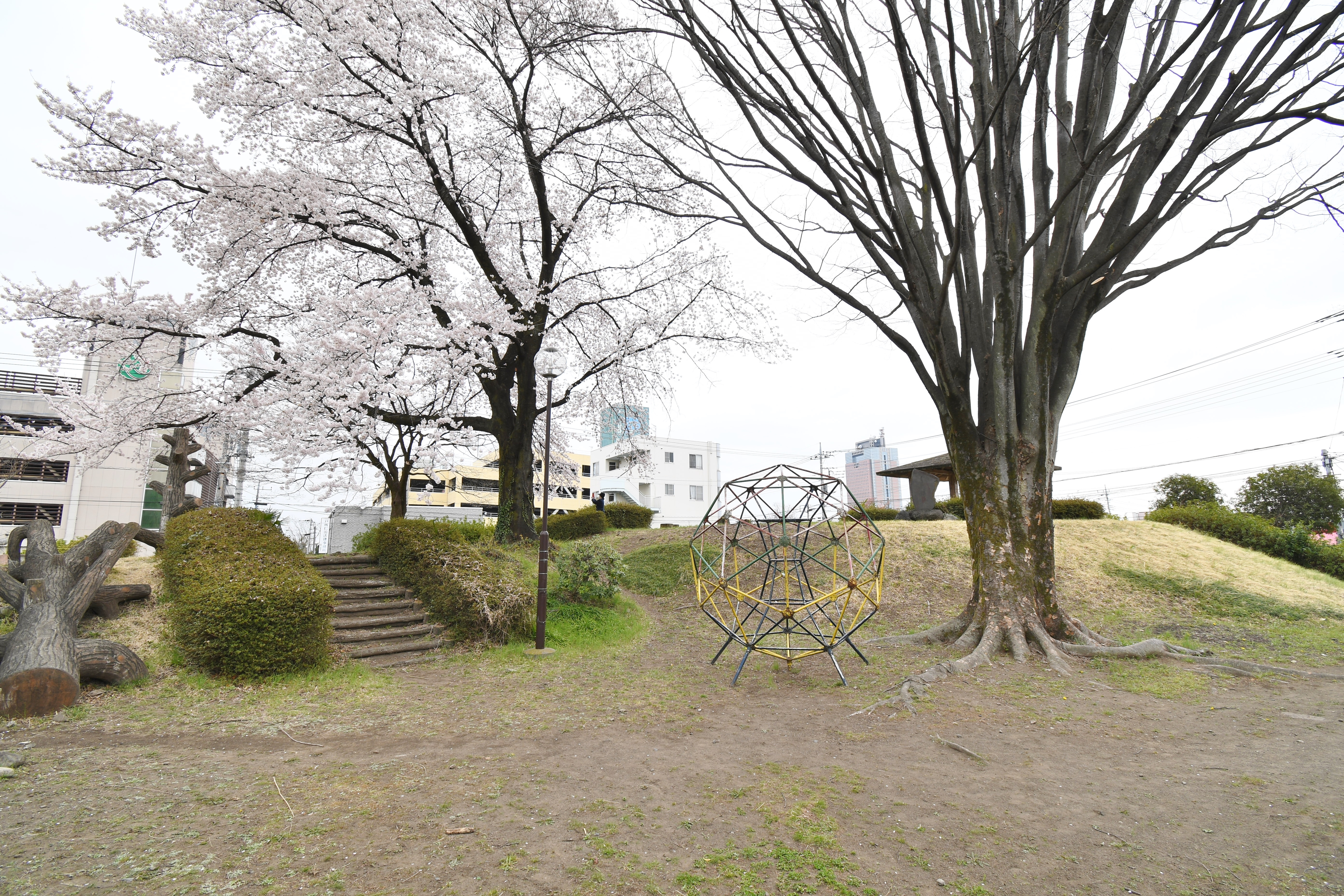
Ōyama Kofun

== See also ==
- List of Historic Sites of Japan (Gunma)
