= Tōmiyama Kofun =

Burial mound in Japan

- 遠見山古墳 (Japanese)
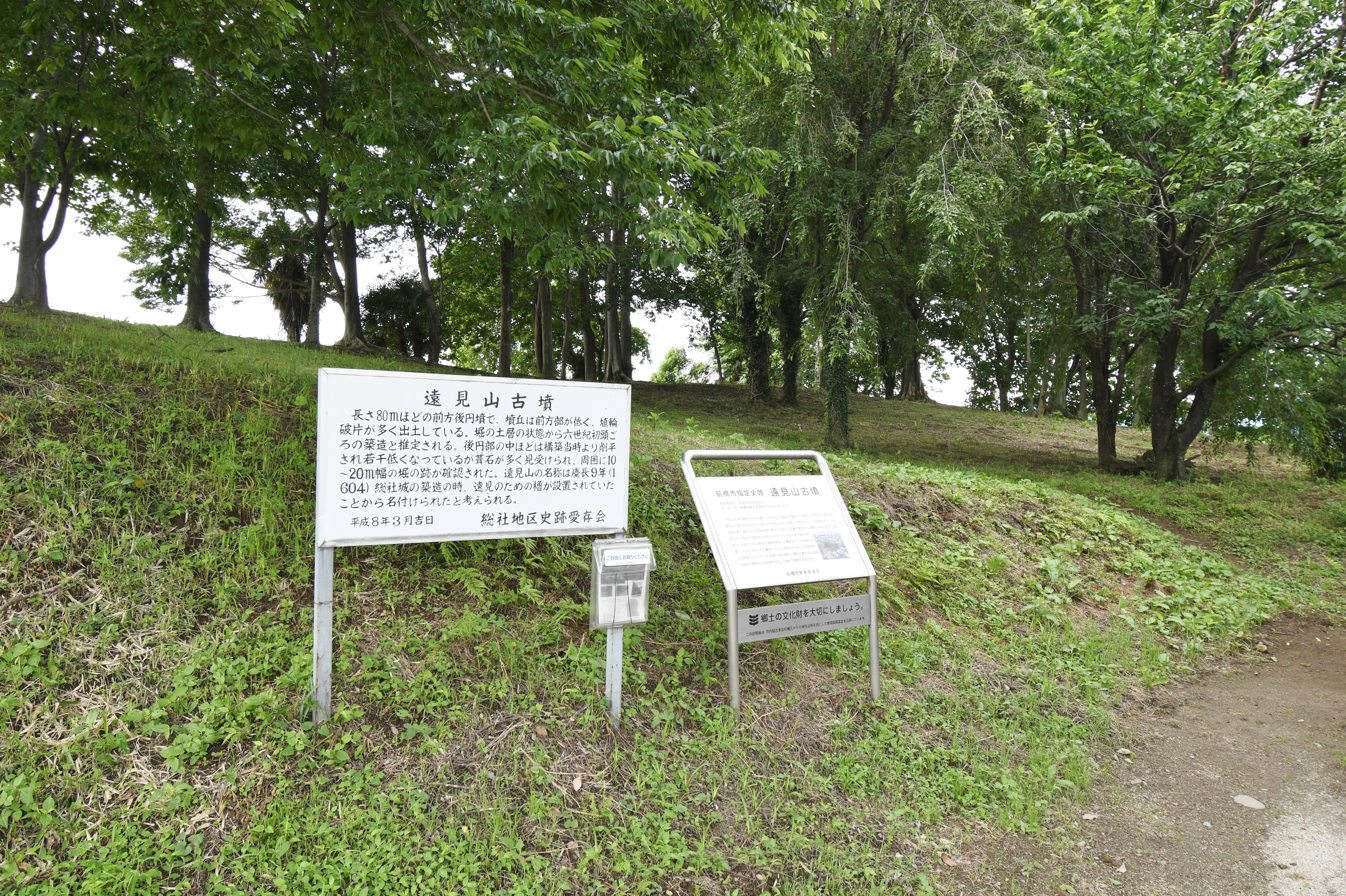
- Tōmiyama Kofun

- Tōmiyama Kofun Tōmiyama Kofun (Japan)
- 36°24′34.73″N 139°2′37.45″E
- Type: kofun
- Periods: Kofun period
- Location: 1410 Sōja, Sōja-chō, Maebashi-shi, Gunma-ken
- Region: Kantō region

History
- Built: late 6th century

Site notes
- Public access: Yes (Park)
- National Historic Site of Japan 総社古墳群分布図

The Tōmiyama Kofun (遠見山古墳) is a Kofun period burial mound located in what is now the Sōja neighborhood of the city of Maebashi, Gunma Prefecture in the northern Kantō region of Japan. It is one of the components of the Sōja Kofun Cluster, which has been designated a National Historic Site of Japan in 2024. Its name comes from its use as a lookout tower for Sōja Castle during the late Sengoku period.

== Overview ==
The Tōmiyama Kofun is a zenpō-kōen-fun (前方後円墳), which is shaped like a keyhole, having one square end and one circular end, when viewed from above. The tumulus is located on the Maebashi Plateau on the west bank of the Tone River at the southeastern foot of Mount Haruna in central Gunma Prefecture. The tumulus is orientated to the southwest and is surrounded by a moat. The surface was originally covered in fukiishi with rows of cylindrical and figurative haniwa (including anthropomorphic haniwa). In addition, ritual remains, including a collection of 14 Haji ware pieces (a high-pitched dish, a large high-pitched dish, a bowl, and a straight-mouthed jar), have been found on the northern terrace of the front section. Details of the burial chamber remain uncertain; although numerous archaeological excavations have been conducted, what is believed to have been a pit-type stone chamber has not been confirmed.The construction date is estimated to be around the second half of the 5th century, during the middle of the Kofun period, based on the style of the haniwa, and volcanic ash from the early 6th century eruption of Mount Haruna. It is considered the oldest of the Sōja Kofun cluster,

Overall length
87.5 meters
Length including moat
106 meters
Posterior circular portion
52.5 meter diameter
Anterior rectangular portion
58 meters wide

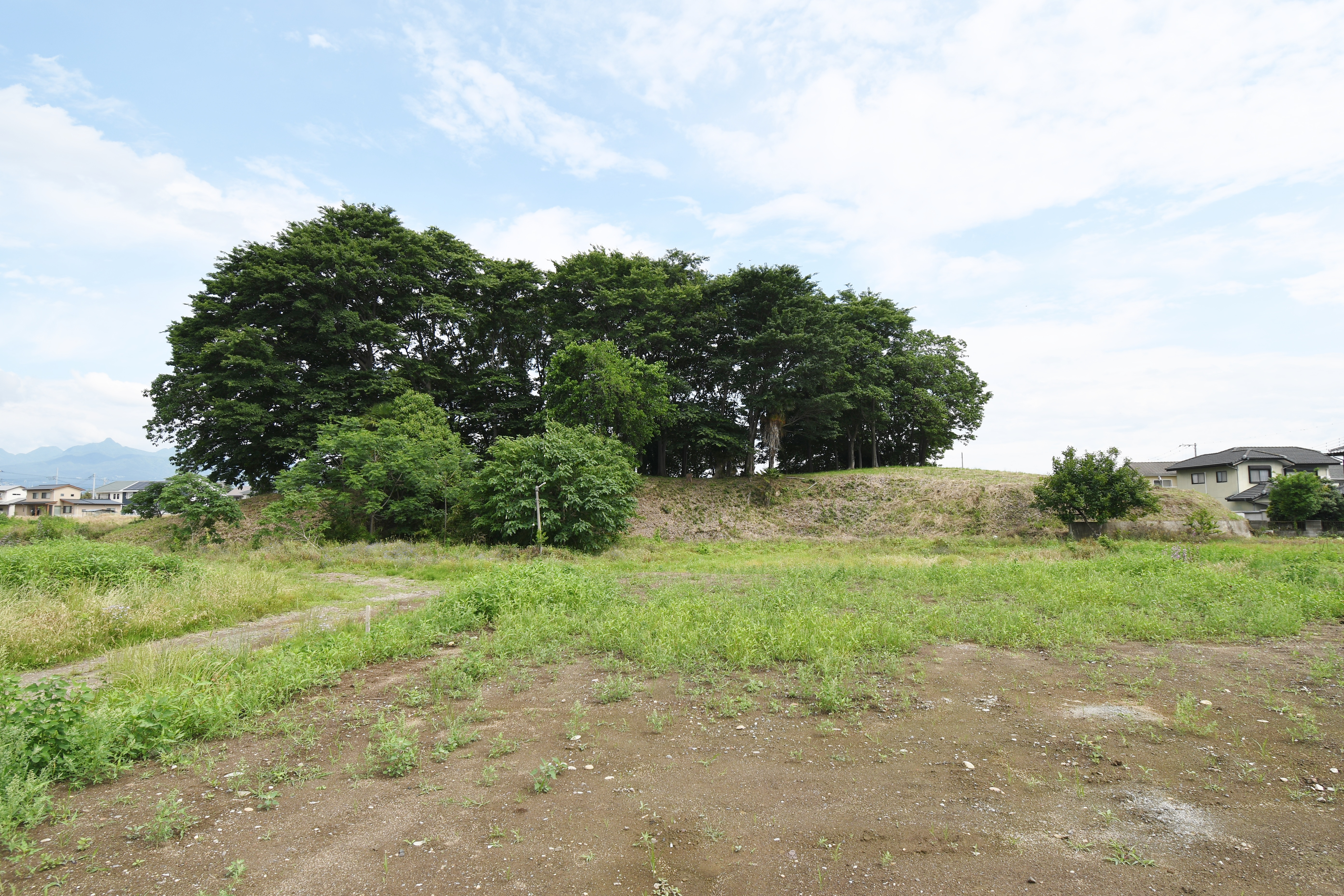
The front part of the mound is on the left and the rear part is on the right.

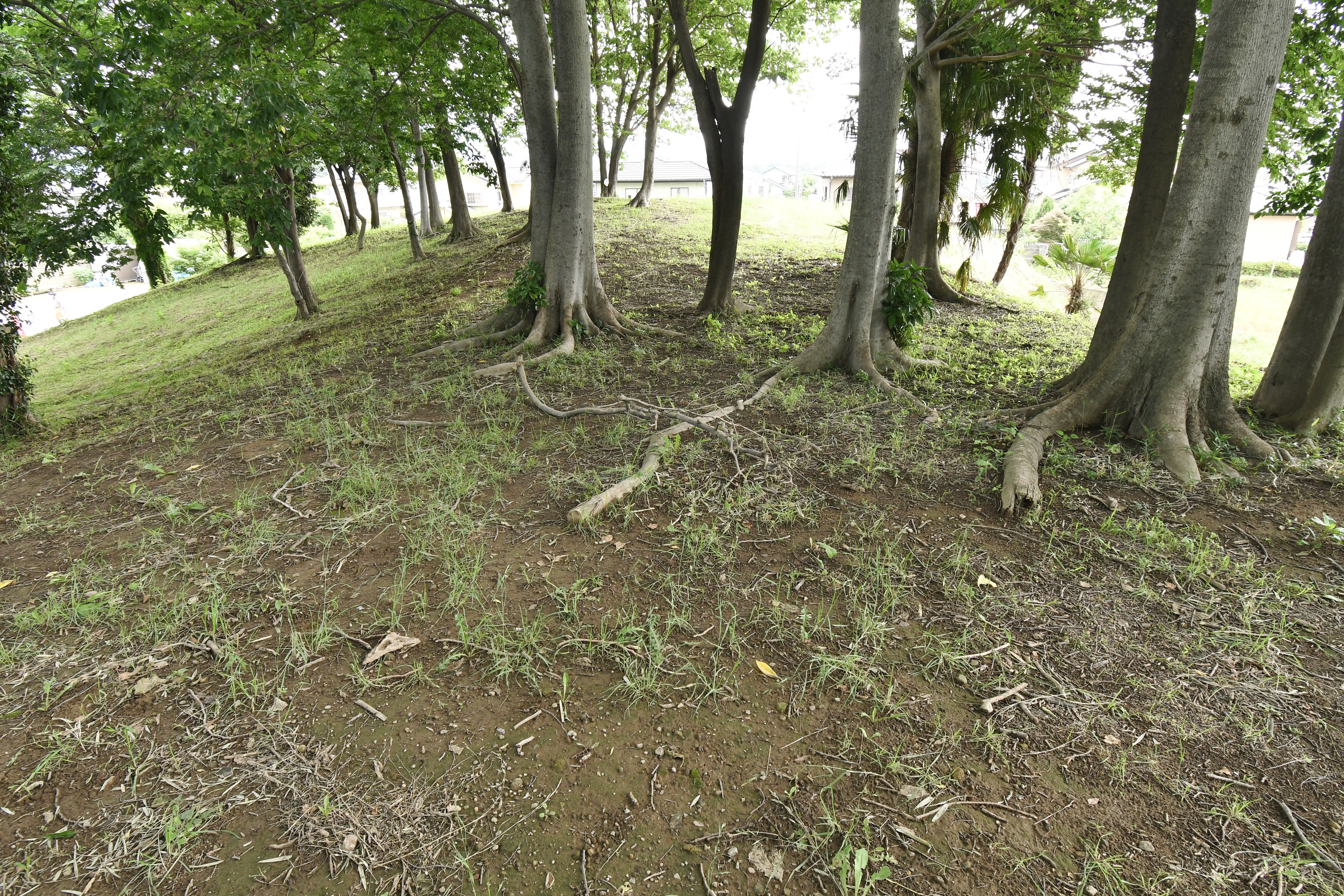
View of the circular mound from the front

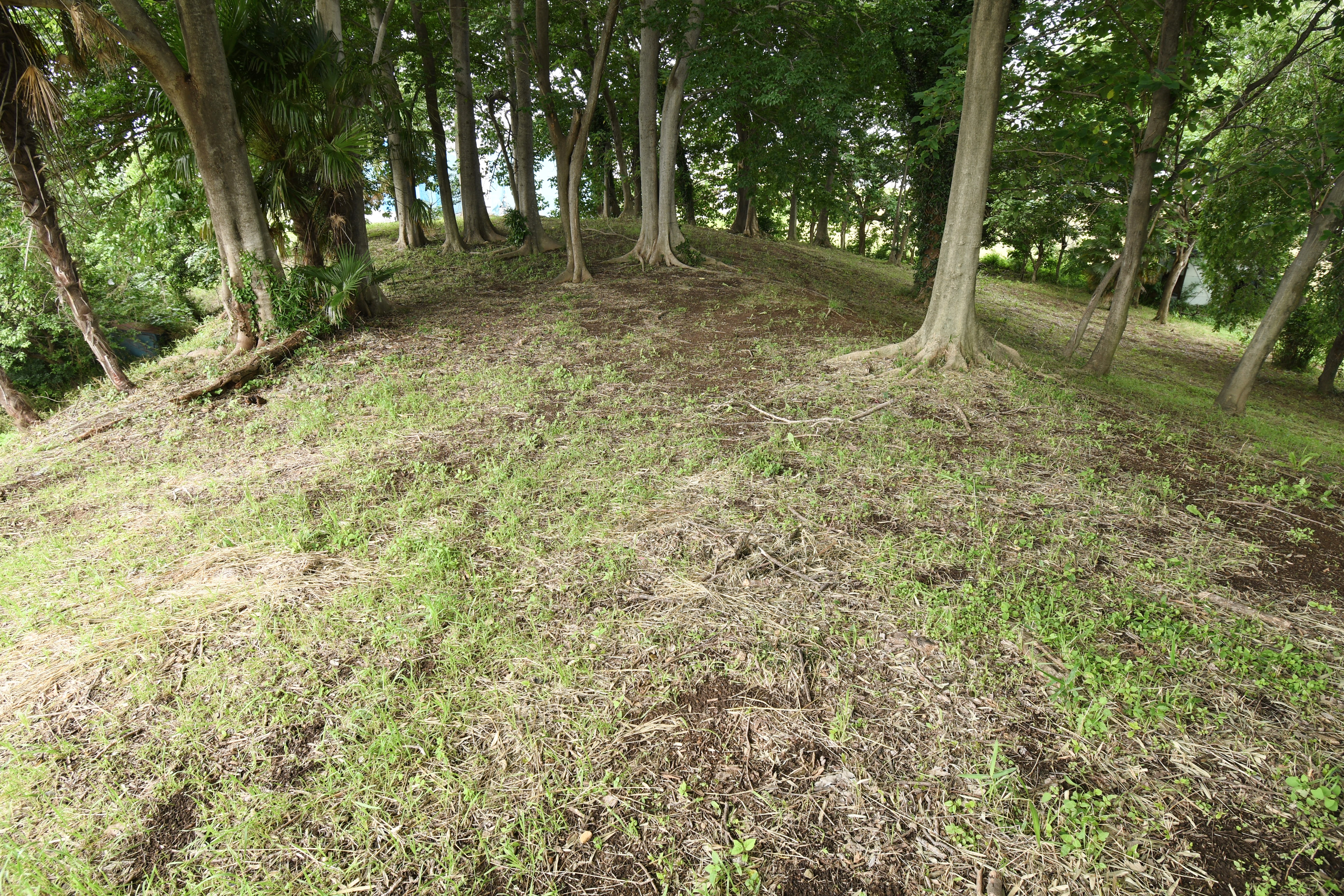
View of the front part from the rear circular mound

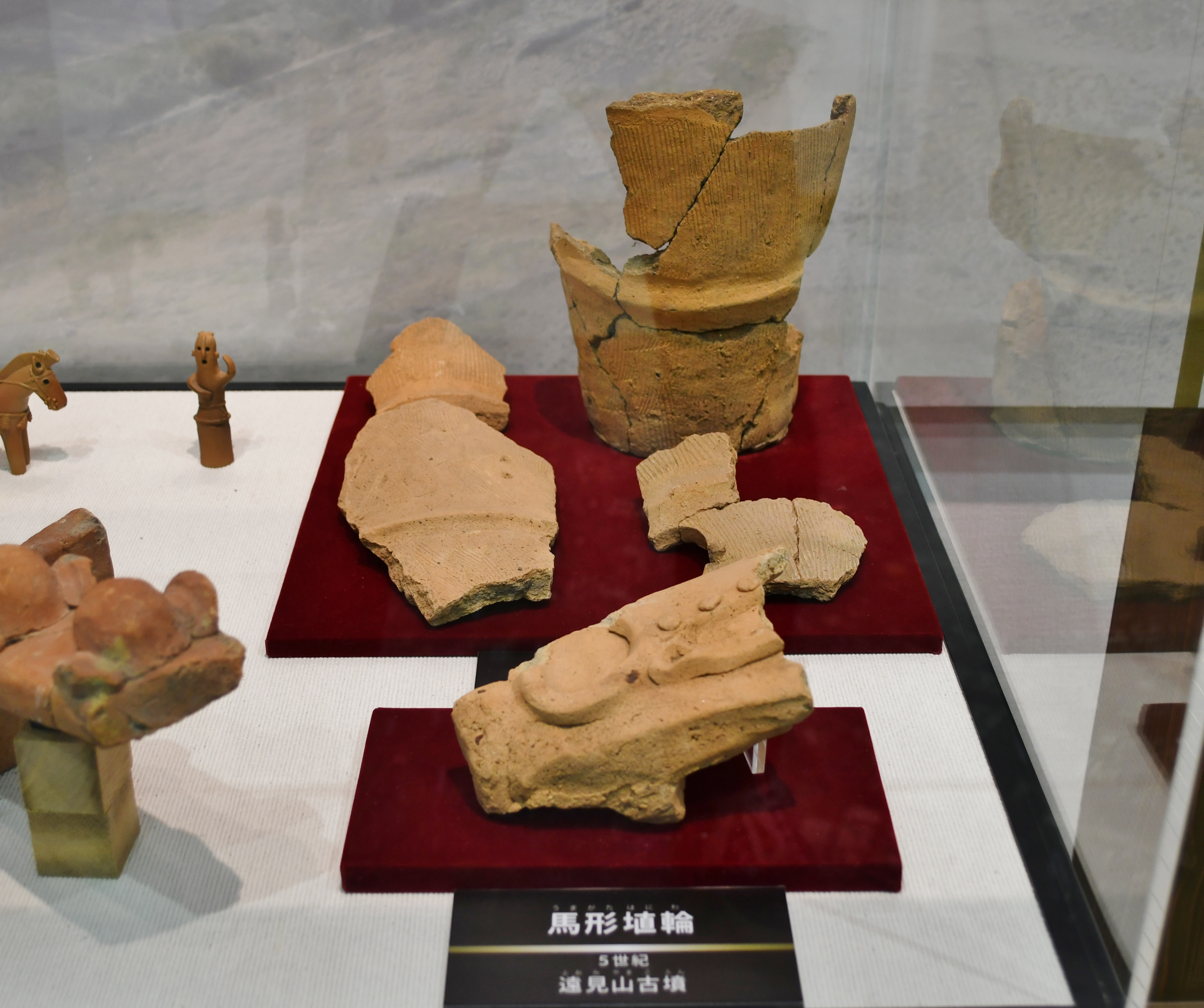
Excavated haniwa
Displayed at Maebashi City Soja Historical Museum.

== See also ==
- List of Historic Sites of Japan (Gunma)
