= Maefutago Kofun =

Kofun period burial mound in Takasaki, Japan

- 前二子古墳 (Japanese)
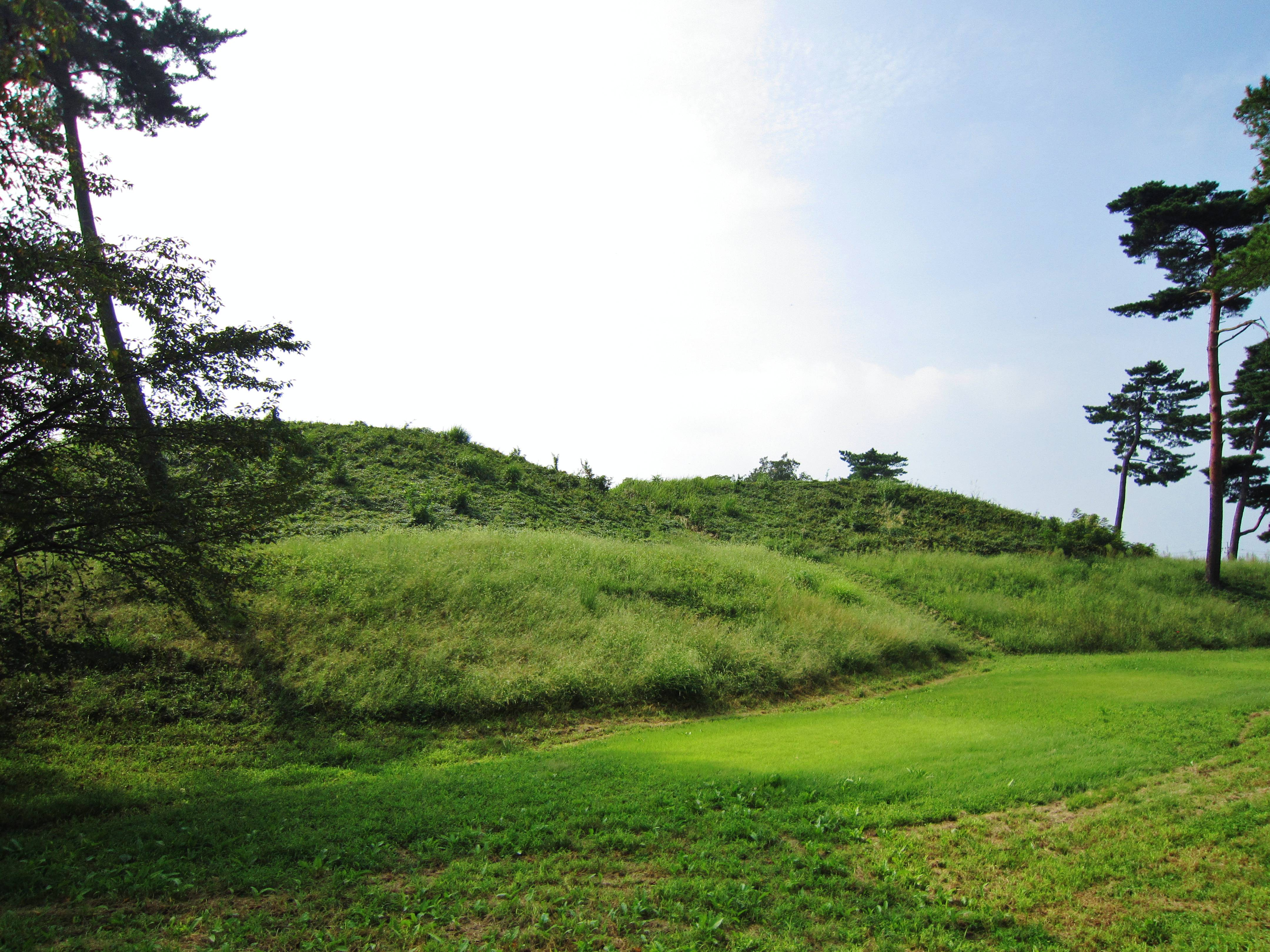
- Maefutago Kofun

- Maefutago Kofun Maefutago Kofun (Japan)
- 36°23′10.2″N 139°11′46.2″E
- Type: kofun
- Periods: Kofun period
- Location: Maebashi, Gunma, Japan
- Region: Kantō region

History
- Built: 6th century

Site notes
- Public access: Yes (Park)

Maefutago Kofun (前二子古墳) is a Kofun period burial mound located in the Nishi-Ōmuro neighborhood of what is now the city of Takasaki, Gunma Prefecture in the northern Kantō region of Japan. It was designated a National Historic Site of Japan in 1927. It is estimated to have been built around beginning of the 6th century AD and is part of a group of at least six kofun which were concentrated in the vicinity, forming the Ōmuro Kofun Cluster. Within the Ōmuro Kofun Cluster are also the Nakafutago Kofun and the Ushirofutago Kofun, which have a separate National Historic Site designations.

== Overview ==
The Maefutago Kofun is located on a low hill at the southern foot of Mount Akagi. It is a zenpō-kōen-fun (前方後円墳), which is shaped like a keyhole, having one square end and one circular end, when viewed from above. The tumulus has a total length of 94 meters, with a posterior circular portion in two tiers and an anterior rectangular portion two tiers, and is orientated to 70 degrees northeast. Part of the mound is carved out of the ground, and only the upper tier was originally covered in fukiishi. Cylindrical, house-shaped and other types of haniwa were also excavated in profusion, and it is estimated that originally more than 1340 haniwa were in rows on the mounds. The tumulus is surrounded by a shield-shaped double moat with a total length of 148 meters.

The tumulus was first excavated in March 1878 as part of a Meiji government project to find the grave of the legendary Toyoki-irihiko no Mikoto, the founder of Keno Province mentioned in the Nara period Nihon Shoki chronicle. The Ushirofutago Kofun was also excavated at the same time, and was initially promoted by the government as the grave of Toyoki-irihiko no Mikoto; however, the proposed designation was lifted after only a year when a stone-lined burial chamber containing a stone sarcophagus and numerous grave goods was discovered with the Maefutago Kofun. This created a media sensation, and an exhibition of artifacts drew crowds of visitors. Although Gunma Prefecture officially petitioned the Imperial Household Agency for recognition of the tomb, the petition failed due to lack of evidence, and the recovered artifacts were stored at a nearby shrine.

Grave goods included two gold earrings, 451 blue glass beads, 17 green glass beads, 28 yellow glass beads, 15 crystal beads, 6 jasper beads, 3 silver balls, several iron swords, iron hooks, saddle and horse fittings, and a comprehensive set of miniature farming tools. The tomb also contained large quantity of Sue ware pottery in various sizes and configurations. Many of these grave goods show a strong connection to the Korean Peninsula, notably the tumulus of King Muryeong of Baekje.

The British diplomat and amateur archaeologist, Sir Ernest Mason Satow visited the site in March 1880 on behalf of the British government and the Asiatic Society of Japan and made a number of sketches also brought back the samples of red pigment and glass beads found in the burial chamber. He published a paper in the Transactions of the Asiatic Society of Japan, vol. 8, no. 3, which also included the results of chemical analysis of iron oxide and potash glass on the artifacts he brought back.

Total length
94 meters
Anterior rectangular portion
65 meters wide, 2-tier
Posterior circular portion
68 meter diameter x 14 meters high, 2-tier

The surrounding area is now maintained as Ōmuro Park (大室公園¥¥) with several other kofun and reconstructions of Kofun-period structures forming an archaeological park.

== See also ==
- List of Historic Sites of Japan (Gunma)
