= Ushirofutago Kofun =

Kofun period burial mound in Japan

Ushiro-Futago Kofun
- 後二子古墳 (Japanese)
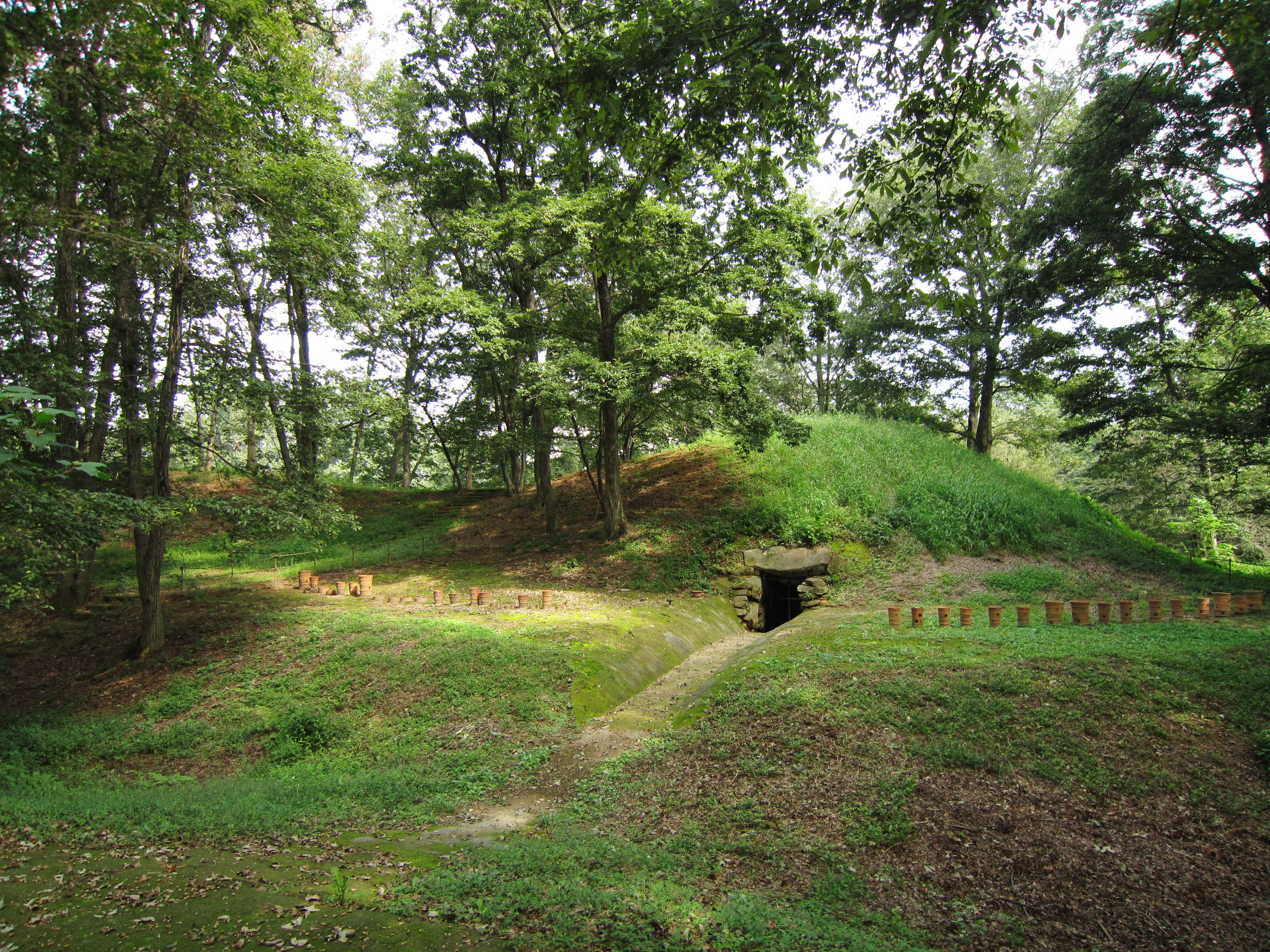
- Ushiro-Futago Kofun

- Ushiro-Futago Kofun Ushirofutago Kofun (Japan)
- 36°23′22″N 139°11′39″E
- Type: kofun
- Periods: Kofun period
- Location: Maebashi, Gunma, Japan
- Region: Kantō region

Site notes
- Discovered: 1973
- Public access: Yes (Park)

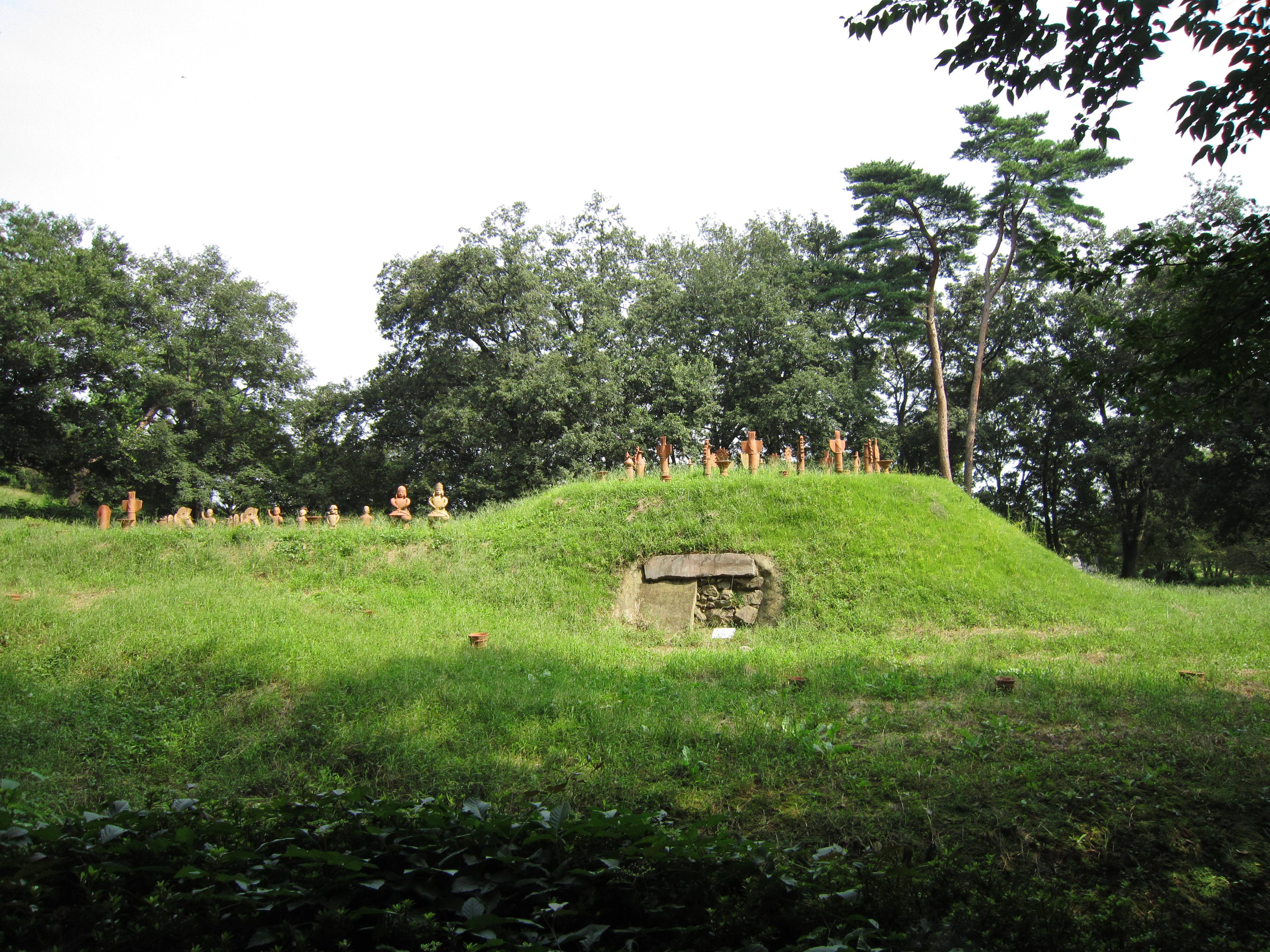
Sho-Futago Kofun

The Ushiro-Futago Kofun (後二子古墳) is a Kofun period burial mound located in the Nishiomuromachi neighborhood of the city of Maebachi, Gunma Prefecture in the northern Kantō region of Japan. Together with the Sho-Futago Kofun (小二子古墳), it was designated a National Historic Site of Japan in 1927. The site dates from the late 6th century AD, and these tumuli are two of the five in the Ōmuro kofun cluster. The area is now preserved as a park.

== Ushirofutago Kofun ==
The Ushirofutago tumulus is a zenpō-kōen-fun (前方後円墳), which is shaped like a keyhole, having one square end and one circular end, when viewed from above. It has two tiers with a total length of 85 meters, and is orientated 110 degrees northeast. The tumulus partly utilizes a natural hill, which was cut away to contain a semi-underground stone-lined burial chamber. Fukiishi were not discovered. The tumulus had a horseshoe-shaped moat with a total length of 106 meters. The lower tier is much larger than the upper tier, similar to the Azuma Kofun in Tochigi Prefecture and this is a characteristic of tombs in the Kenō region (former Kōzuke and Shimotsuke Provinces). After the discovery of the burial chamber in 1878, an application was issued to the Imperial Household Agency to certify the tumulus as the tomb of King Mimorowake, a name which appears in the Nara period Nihon Shoki chronicle as king of the Kenō region, but the application was denied due to lack of physical evidence.

Total length
85 meters
Anterior rectangular portion
60 meters wide, 2-tier
Posterior circular portion
48 meter diameter x 11 meters high, 2-tiers

The burial chamber had a total length is nine meters, with a height of 2.2 meters high and width of 2.7 meters. A large amount of Sue ware pottery, a long iron sword, short iron sword, horse harnesses, and some iron slag was found within the chamber as grave goods. Eleven earrings were also discovered, leading Meiji period researchers to conclude that at least six people were buried in this kofun. Three human teeth were discovered, and were found to be that of a woman. In the vestibule, there was evidence that fires had been lit at at least three locations to cook food in a ritual banquet for the deceased. Some 400 haniwa were found in various locations around the tumulus. Most were cylindrical, but several are decorated with bas-relief carvings of a monkey, a dog, or a dog chasing a monkey and its child. Such haniwa have been found at only three locations in Japan, all of which have been in Gunma.

== Sho-Futago Kofun ==
This smaller tumulus has two tiers with a total length of 85 meters, and is orientated 131 degrees northeast. The tumulus partly utilizes a natural hill, which was cut away to contain a semi-underground stone-lined burial chamber. Fukiishi were not discovered. The tumulus had a horseshoe-shaped moat with a total length of 44 meters. The condition of the tumulus was poor, so it was fully excavated by archaeologists in the Meiji period.

Total length
38 meters
Anterior rectangular portion
18 meters wide
Posterior circular portion
30 meter diameter x 5 meters high

The burial chamber has a total length is 69 meters, with a height of 1.8 meters high and width of 1.8 meters. It was formerly stone-lined, but the stones were stolen in the Meiji period. Grave goods include a small amount of Sue ware pottery, 14 glass beads, 3 bronze earrings, 3 straight iron swords, 1 iron sword, 9 bow metal fittings, and some iron slag was found within. In the vestibule, as with the Ushirofutago Kofun, there was evidence that fires had been lit to cook food in a ritual banquet for the deceased. Some 80-90 cylindrical haniwa were found in various locations around the tumulus, including one in the shape of a person.

== See also ==
- List of Historic Sites of Japan (Gunma)
