= Jaketsuzan Kofun =

Kofun period burial mound in Maebashi, Kantō, Japan

- 蛇穴山古墳 (Japanese)
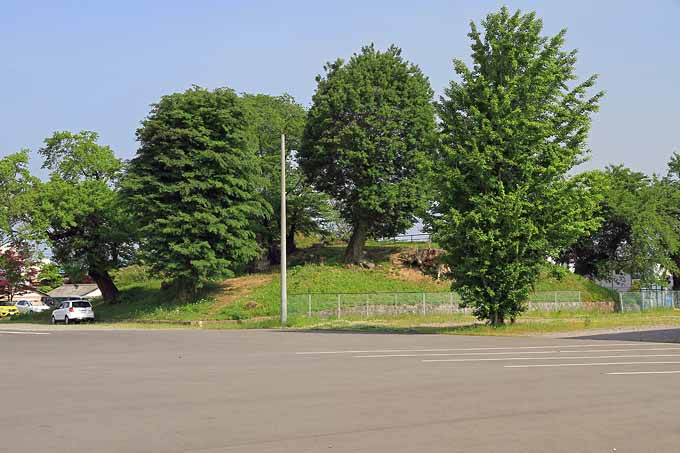
- Jaketsuzan Kofun

- Jaketsuzan kofun Jaketsuzan Kofun (Japan)
- 36°24′25″N 139°02′23″E
- Type: kofun
- Periods: Kofun period
- Location: 1586-1 Sōja, Sōja-chō, Maebashi-shi, Gunma-ken
- Region: Kantō region

Site notes
- Public access: Yes (no public facilities)
- National Historic Site of Japan 総社古墳群分布図

The Jaketsuzan kofun (蛇穴山古墳) is a square-shaped (hōfun (方墳)) Kofun period burial mound located in what is now the Sōja neighborhood of the city of Maebashi, Gunma Prefecture in the northern Kantō region of Japan. The site was designated a National Historic Site of Japan in 1974, with the area under protection expanded in 2021. It became part of the expanded Sōja Kofun Cluster designation in 2024.

== Overview ==
The Jaketsuzan Kofun is located in the northwestern part of Maebashi city, about 600 meters to the west of Otobashi Bridge over the Tone River at the southeastern foot of Mount Haruna in central Gunma Prefecture. It is located in an area with a heavy concentration of kofun burial mounds. The tumulus is located adjacent to the Hōtōzan Kofun, the Kōzuke Kokubun-ji and the provincial capital of Kōzuke Province, and is located approximately a 10-minute walk from Sōja Station on the JR East Jōetsu Line. The name of the tomb comes from a snake carved into the back wall of the stone chamber during the Kanbun era (1661-1673) of the Edo period. Archaeological excavations have been conducted since 1975.

The tumulus is built as a step pyramid in three tiers, with its main axis tilted 13 degrees from north to east, measuring 44 meters on each side and 5 meters high. Fukiishi have been found on the exterior of the mound, but no haniwa have been found. The tumulus is surrounded by a shallow double moat, and the entire tomb, including the moat, measures 82 meters on each side. The burial chamber is a stone-lined chamber with a south-southwest opening. The burial chamber, constructed using cut stone masonry, lacks a passageway and consists only of a vestibule and a main chamber, with a depth of thee meters and width of 2.6 meters and height of 1.8 meters. Each side of the vestibule is constructed from a single piece of cut stone. The main chamber contains a sandstone block which may have been a stand for the sarcophagus. The ceiling, back wall and side sides are each made with a single monolithic andesite boulders which are slightly water polished. The entrance stone is carved to resemble gate pillars. There are also traces of a plaster coating on the inside of the chamber. The burial chamber has stood open since ancient times, so no grave goods have been found.

The tumulus is believed to have been one of the last built in this area, from the end of the 7th century to the beginning of the 8th century. The Hōtōzan and Jaketsuzan tombs share common stonework techniques with the Sannō temple ruins, located southwest.

Overall length
44 meters
Overall Width
44 meters
Height
5 meters
Moat
Average width 11 meters, depth 1.1-1.9 meters
Central bank
Approximately 5 meters wide at the top, approximately 6.5 meters wide at the bottom, 1.2 meters high inside, 0.5 meters high outside
Peripheral ditch
2.8-3.3 meters wide at the top (average 3.0 meters), 0.2-0.6 meters deep

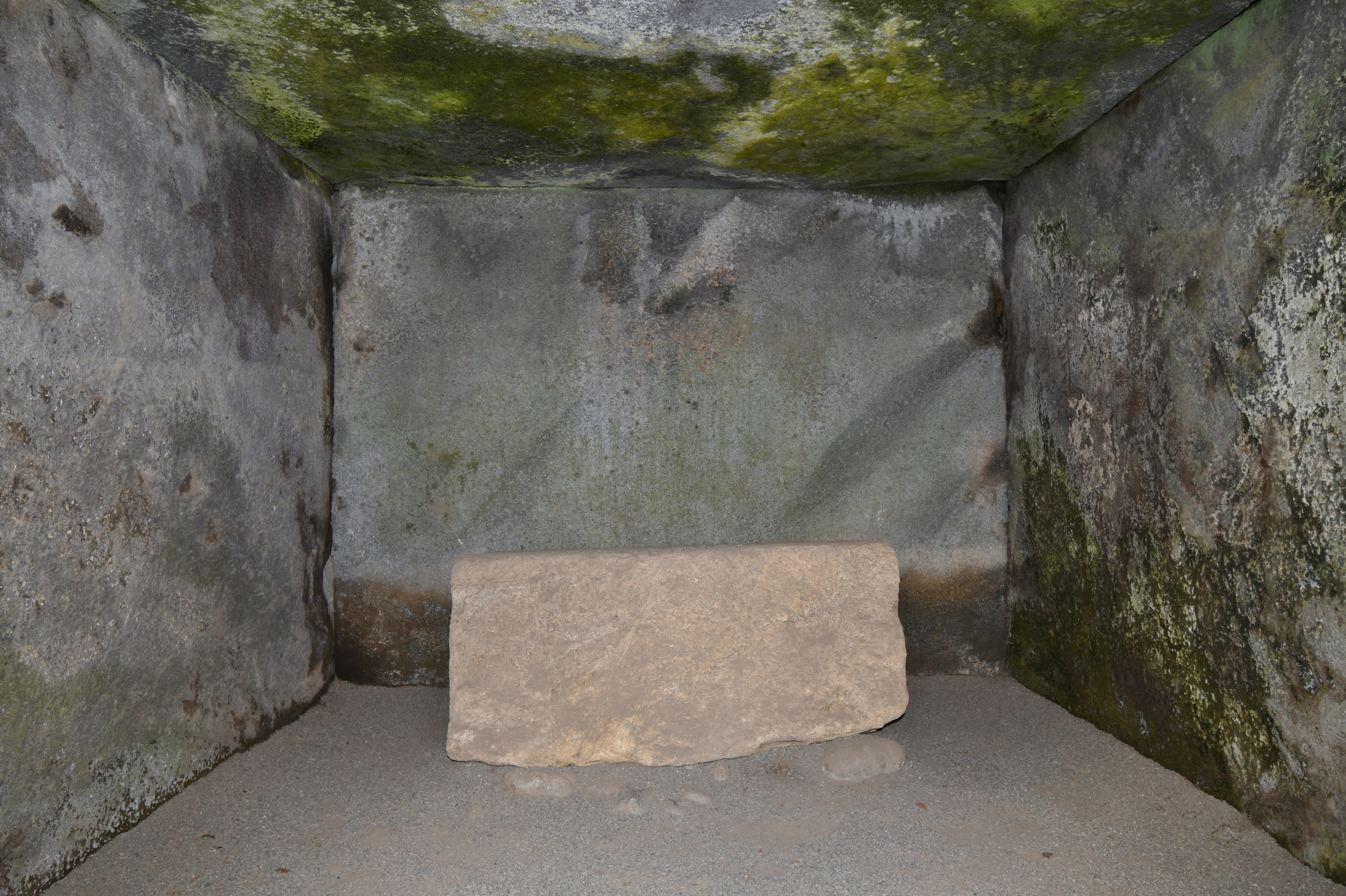
Antechamber (towards the back wall)

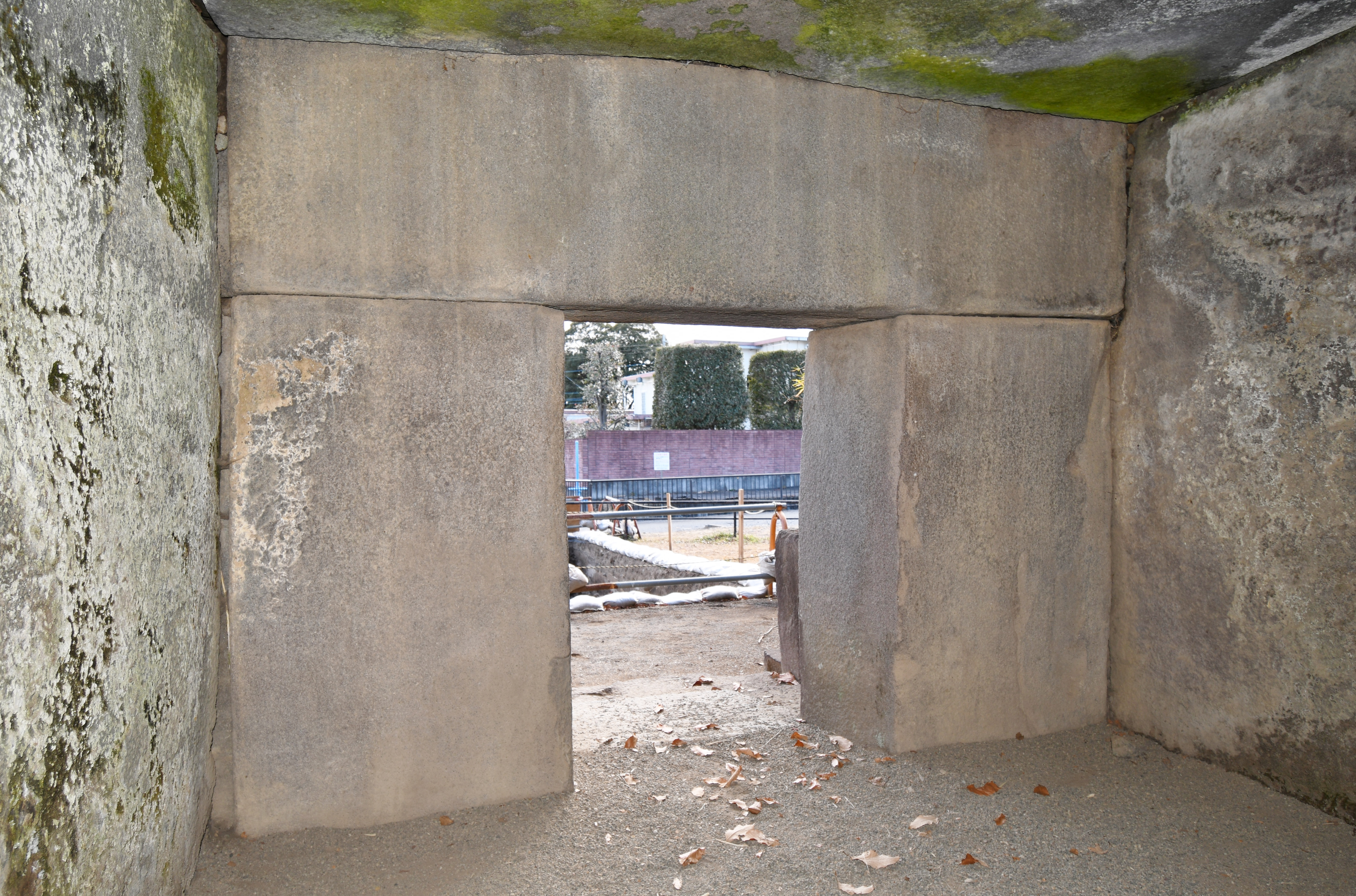
Antechamber (towards the opening)

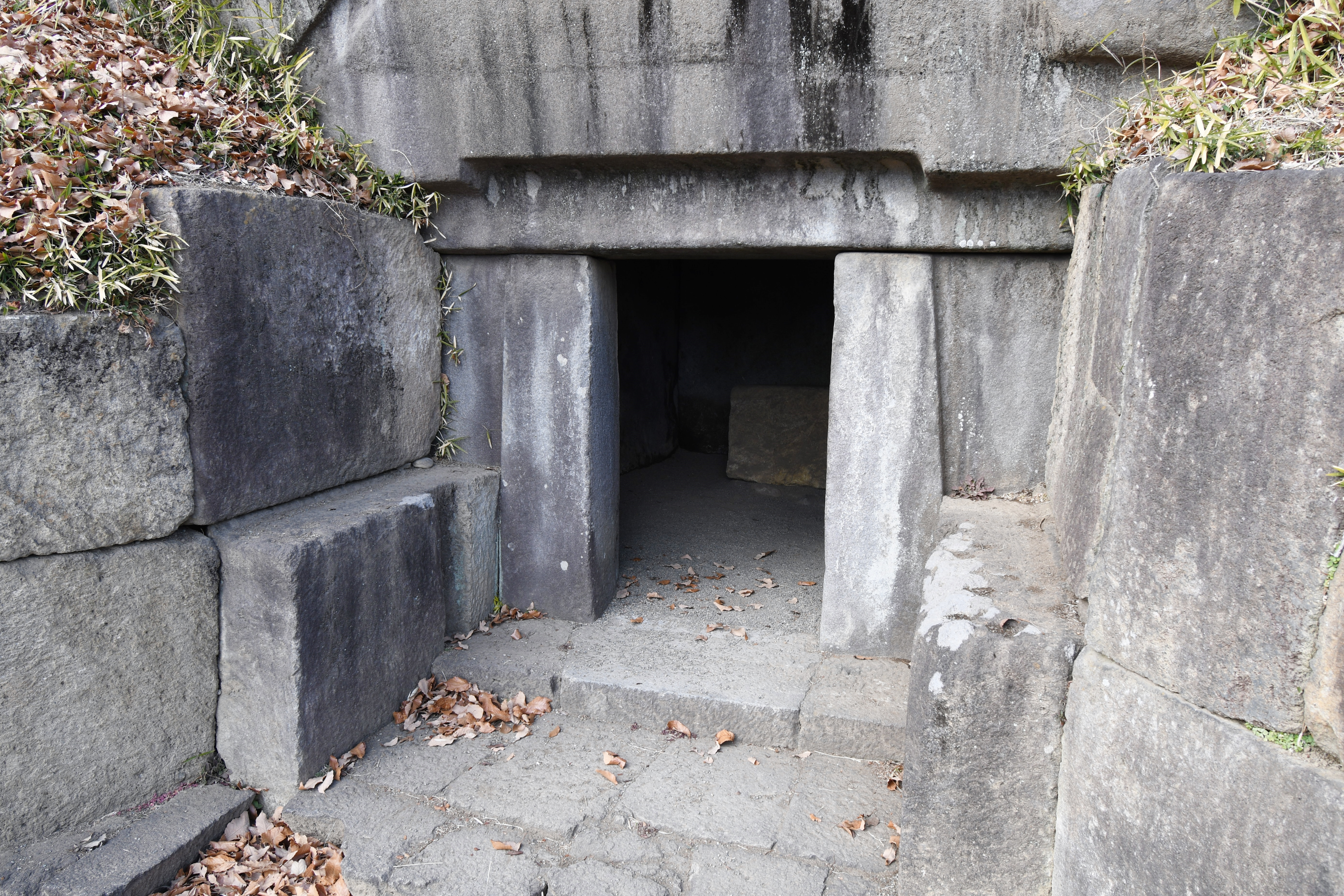
Antechamber (towards the antechamber)
The antechamber features carved gateposts and crownings, and the door stone is carved in front of the antechamber.

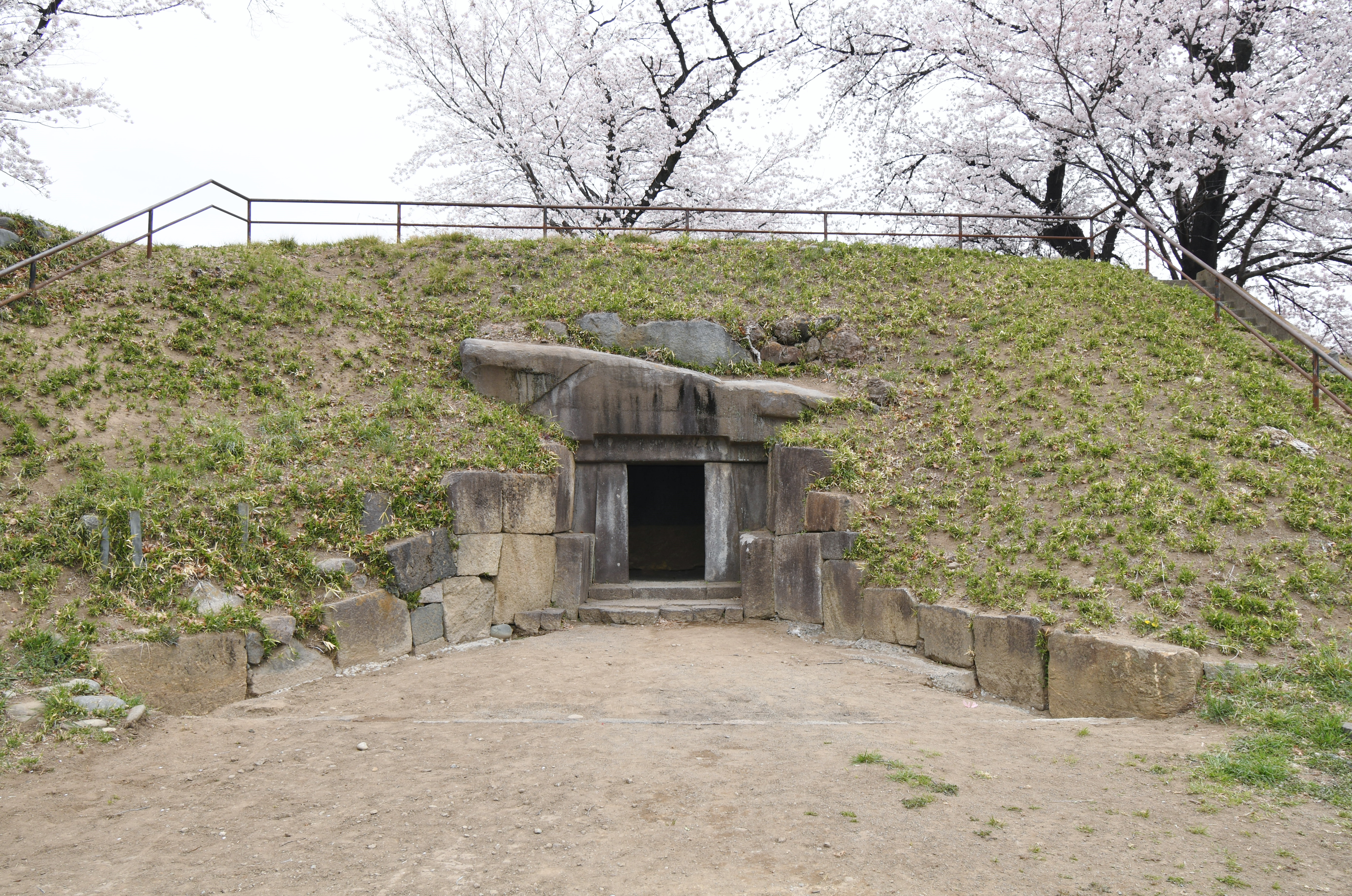
The front courtyard of the stone chamber

== See also ==
- List of Historic Sites of Japan (Gunma)
