= Hōtōzan Kofun =

Hōtōzan kofun
- 宝塔山古墳 (Japanese)
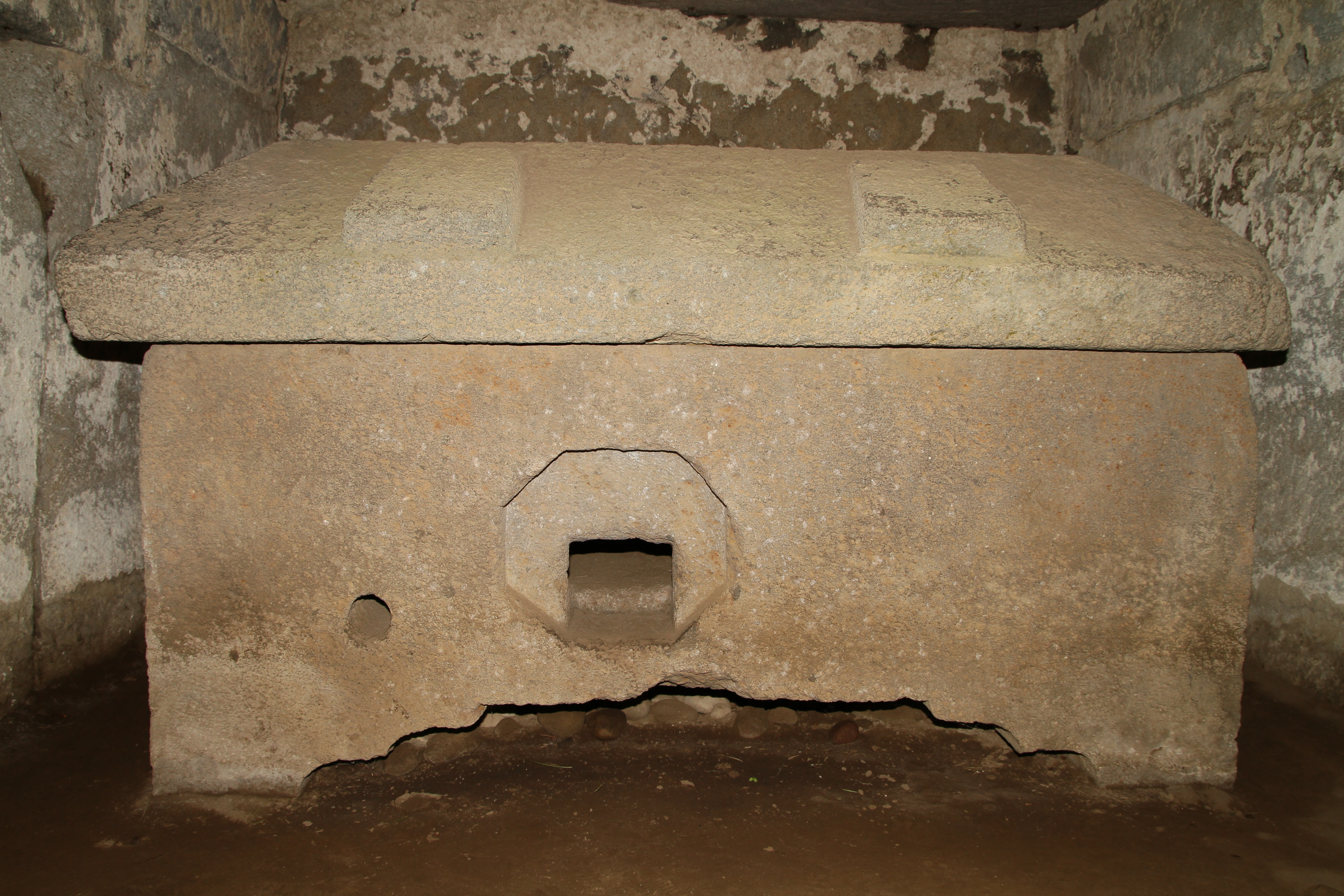
- Hōtōzan kofun sarcophagus

- Hōtōzan kofun Hōtōzan Kofun (Japan)
- 36°24′26″N 139°02′19″E
- Type: kofun
- Periods: Kofun period
- Location: 1603-1 Sōja, Sōja-chō, Maebashi-shi, Gunma-ken
- Region: Kantō region

Site notes
- Public access: Yes

総社古墳群分布図

The Hōtōzan Kofun (宝塔山古墳) is a Kofun period burial mound located in what is now the Sōja neighborhood of the city of Maebashi, Gunma Prefecture in the northern Kantō region of Japan. The site was designated a National Historic Site of Japan in 1944, with the area under protection expanded in 2021. It became part of the expanded Sōja Kofun Cluster designation in 2024. Archaeological excavations have been conducted on the tumulus and its surroundings since 1968.

== Overview ==
The Hōtōzan Kofun is located on the west bank of the Tone River at the southeastern foot of Mount Haruna in central Gunma Prefecture. The tumulus is a hōfun (方墳), with square sides, built as a step pyramid in three tiers, 54 meters on each side, and a height of 12 meters, with its main axis tilted 32 degrees from north to east. Fukiishi have been found on the exterior of the mound, but no haniwa have been found. The tumulus is surrounded by a shallow 18-meter wide moat. The burial chamber is a stone-lined chamber with a total length of 12 meters, orientated to the southwest. The large burial chamber is a complex structure consisting of a main chamber, an antechamber, an antechamber, a passageway, and a vestibule. The walls are made from rectangular megalithic blocks of andesite, which were once plastered and presumably decorated with paint. The hollowed-out house-shaped stone sarcophagus was placed perpendicular to the long axis of the chamber, and has a distinctive latticework carved into its base. It is presumed to have been built at the end of the 7th century AD, or at the very end of the Kofun period, when Buddhist ritual practices were supplanting the tumulus culture. No grave goods have been found, as the burial chamber has been open since ancient times. The tumulus is estimated to have been built around the mid-7th century, toward the end of the Kofun period.

Overall length
54 meters
Overall width
54 meters
Height
12 meters

The tumulus is located adjacent to the Jaketsuzan Kofun, the Kōzuke Kokubun-ji and the provincial capital of Kōzuke Province, and is located approximately a 10-minute walk from Sōja Station on the JR East Jōetsu Line.

During the early Edo period, the area around Sōja was ruled as Sōja Domain, a 15,000 koku feudal domain under the Tokugawa shogunate ruled by the Akimoto clan as daimyō. The Akimoto clan ruled from 1601 to 1633, and the graves of the clan leaders were built on top of the Hōtōzan Kofun. These graves are a Maebashi City designated history site.

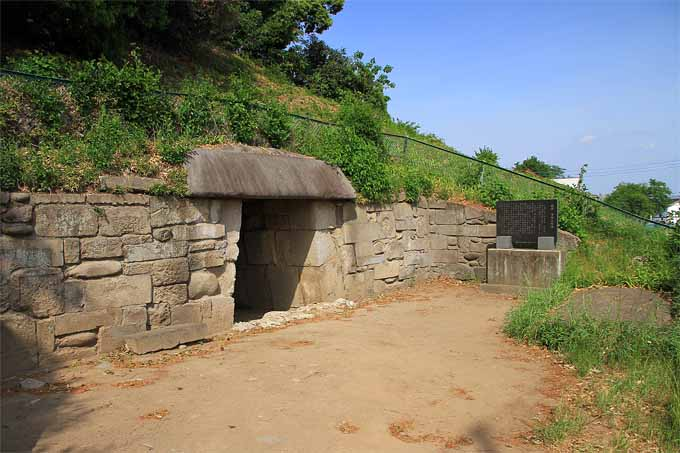
Hōtōzan Kofun

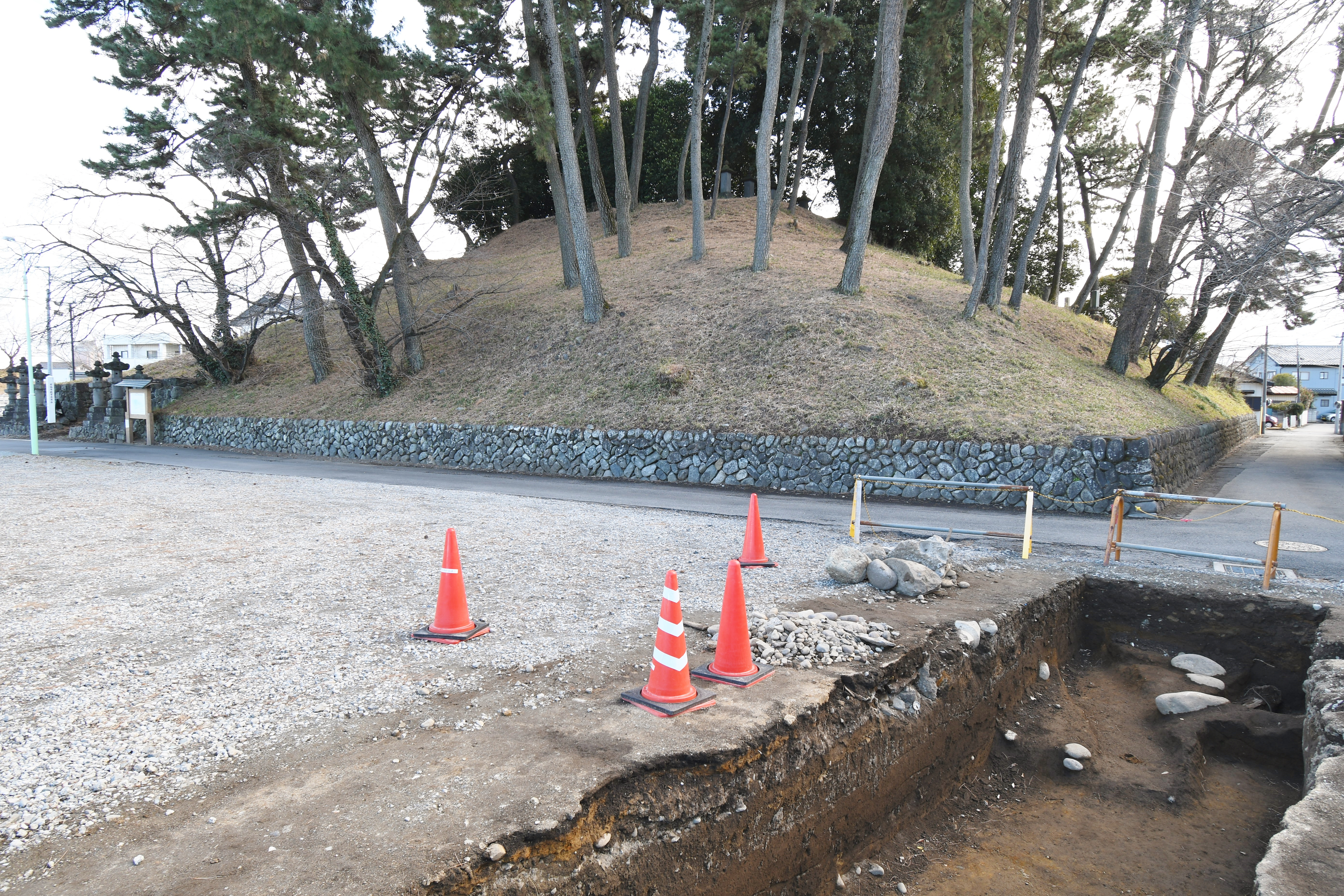
Tumulus form the northwest with excavation trench from 2021 excavation

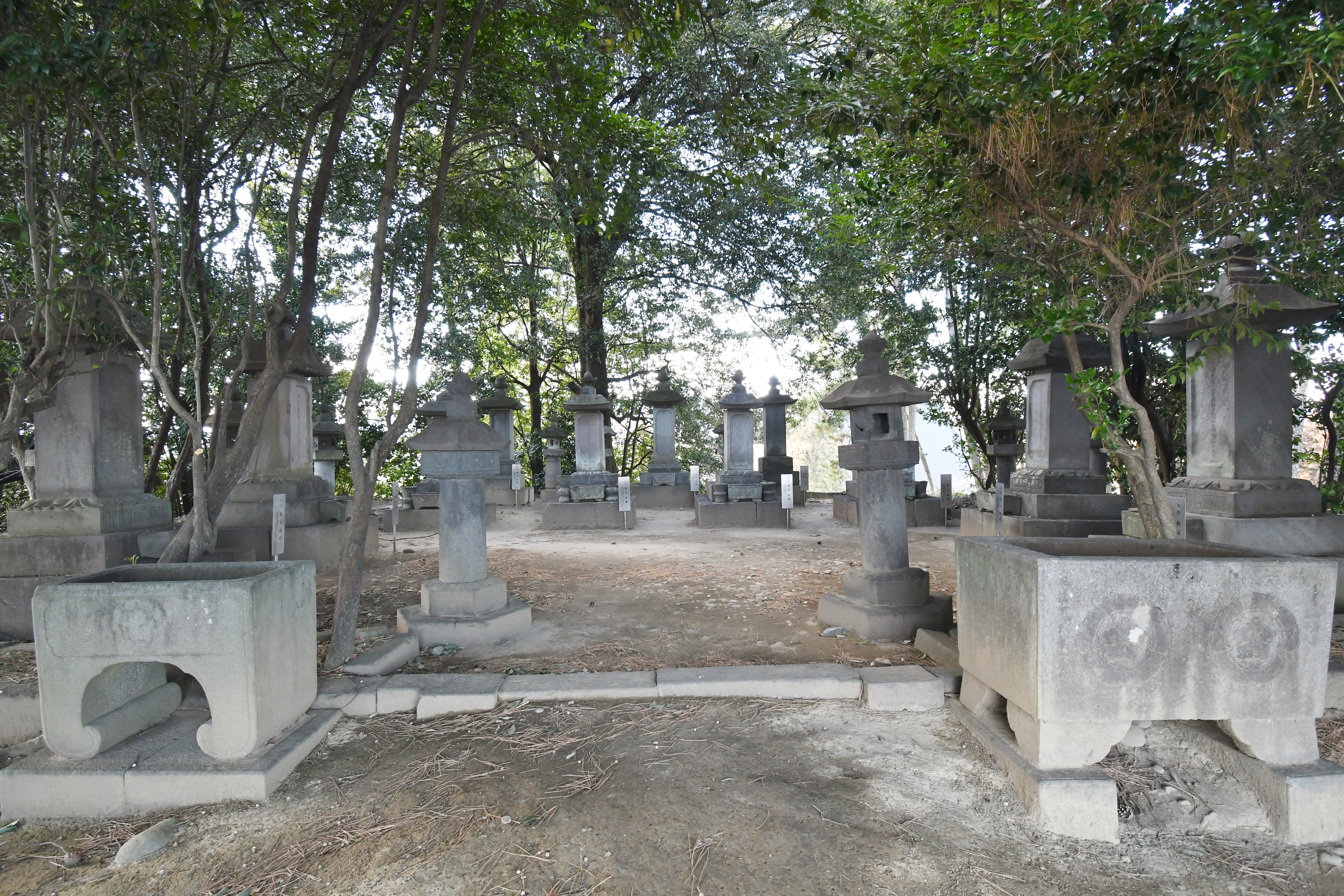
Akimoto clan cemetery

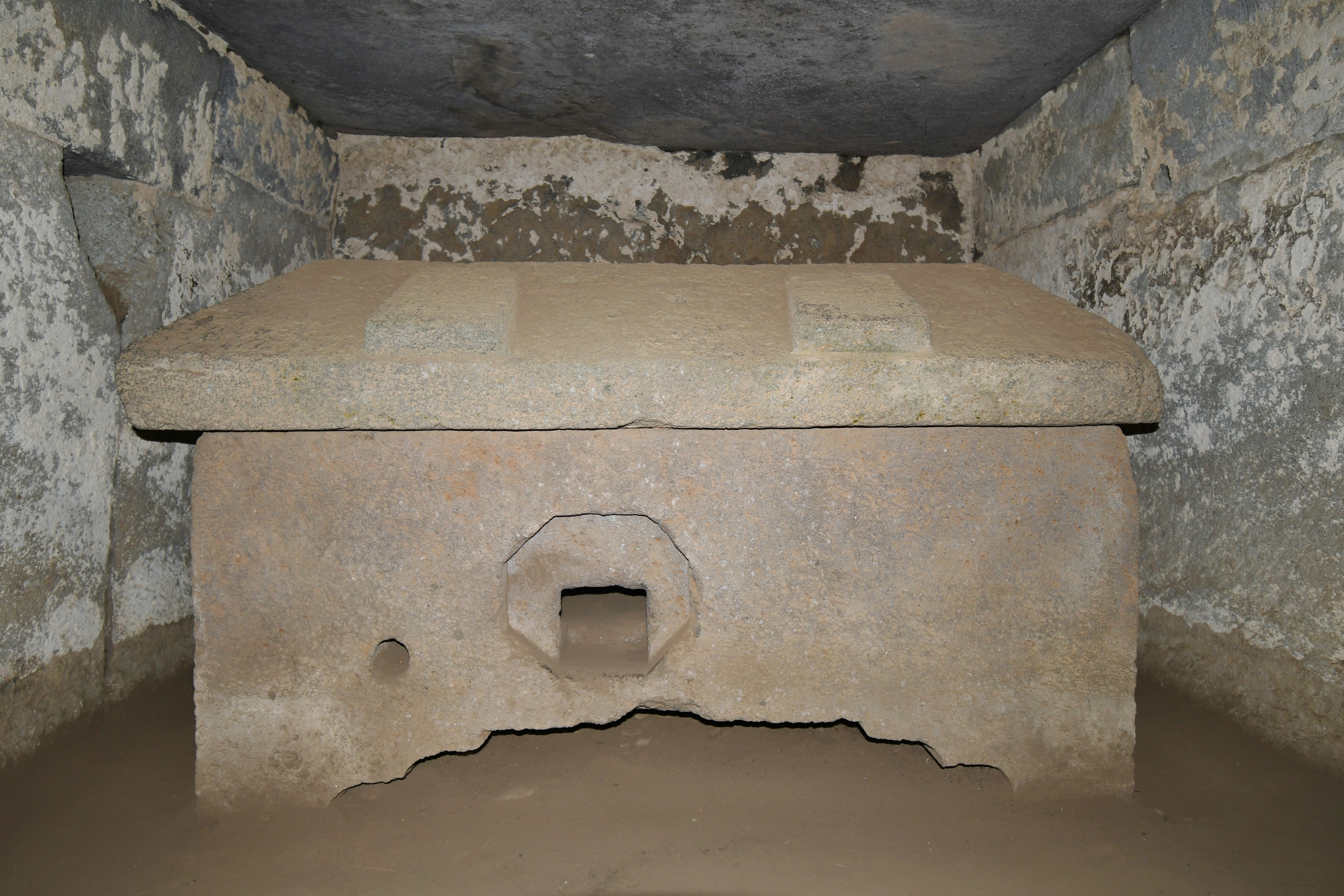
Antechamber (house-shaped stone coffin in the center)

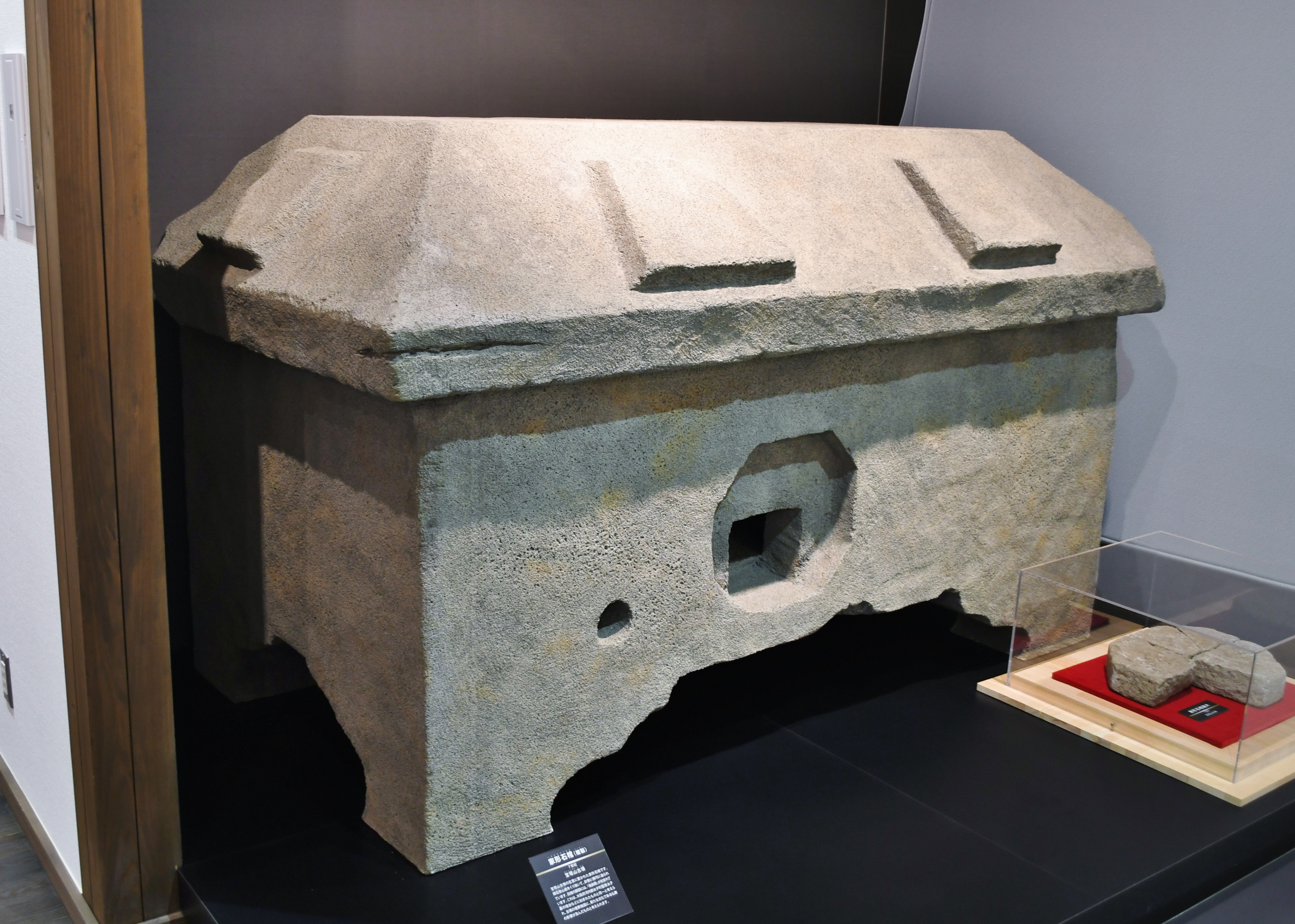
House-shaped Stone Coffin (Replica)
Displayed at Maebashi City Soja Historical Museum.

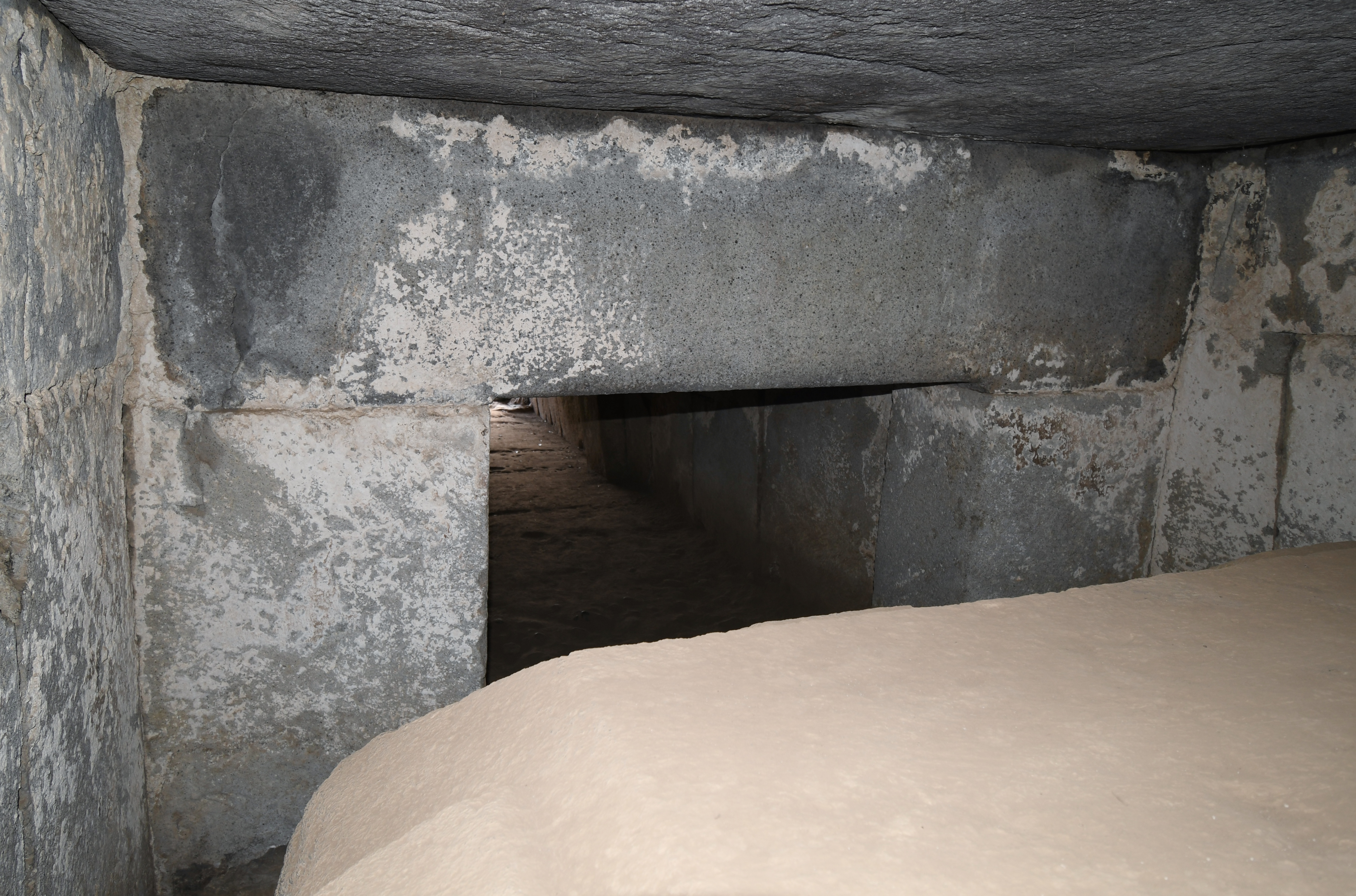
Front gate (toward the opening)

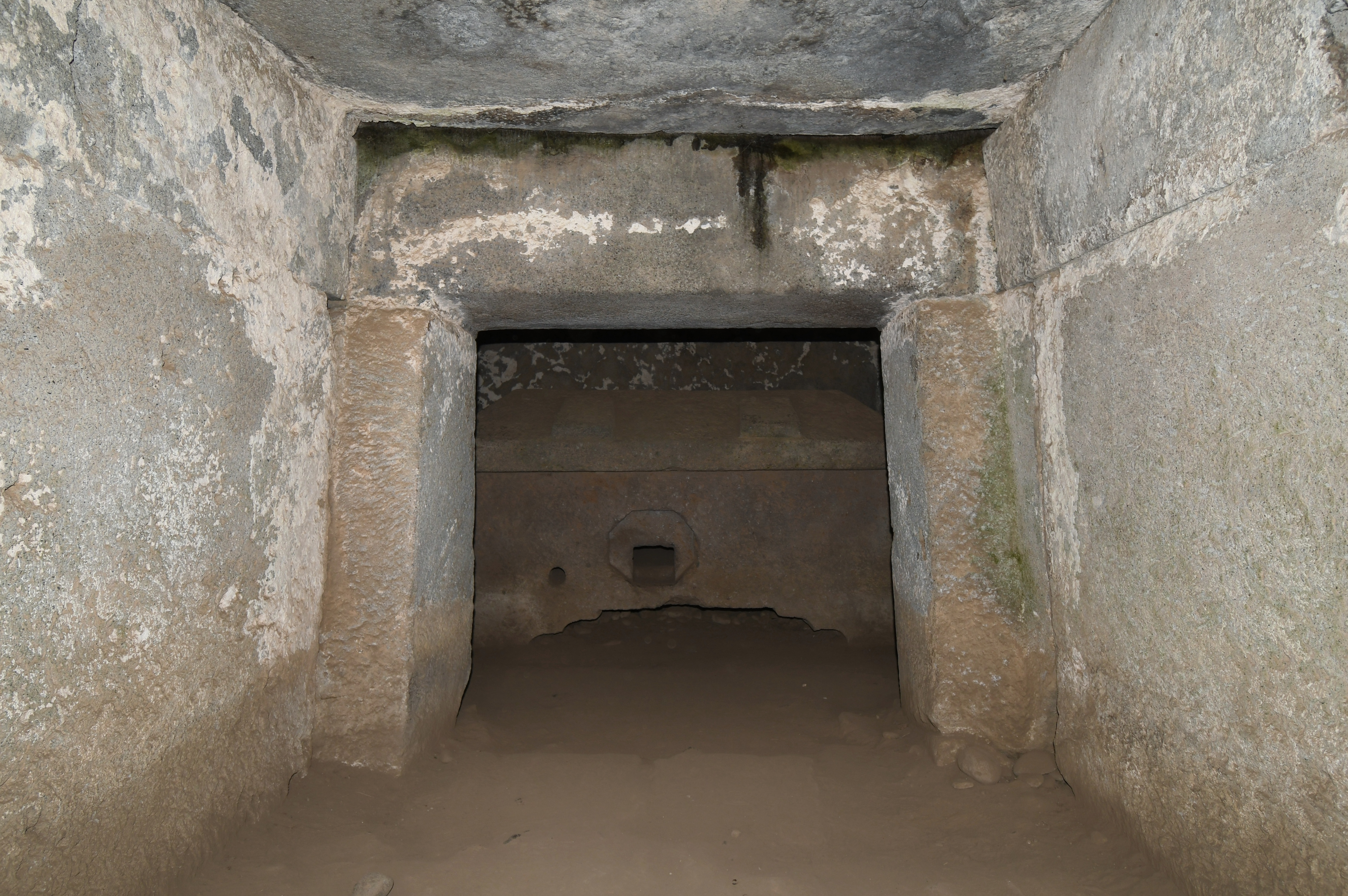
Front gate (toward the antechamber)

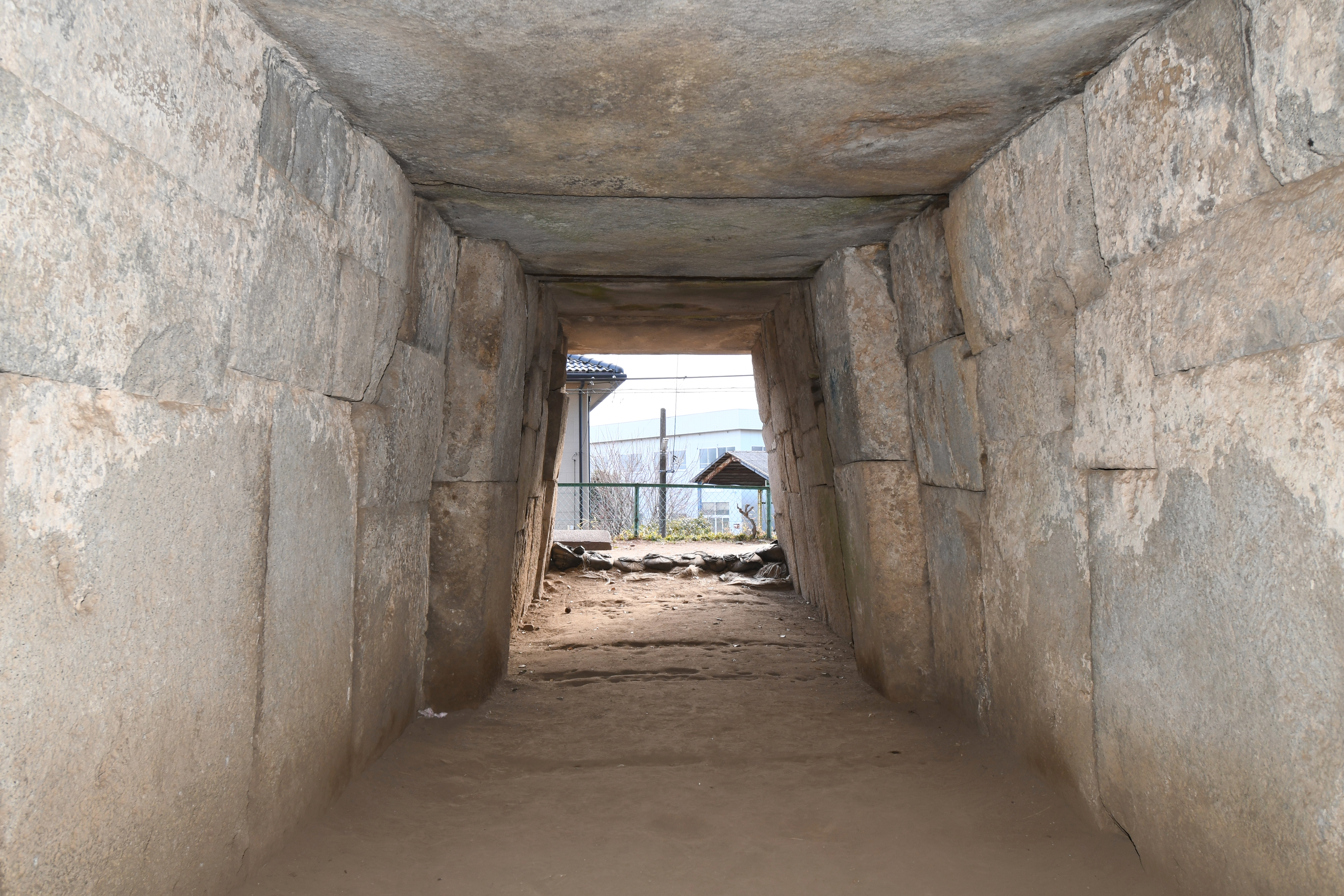
Vestibule (toward the opening)

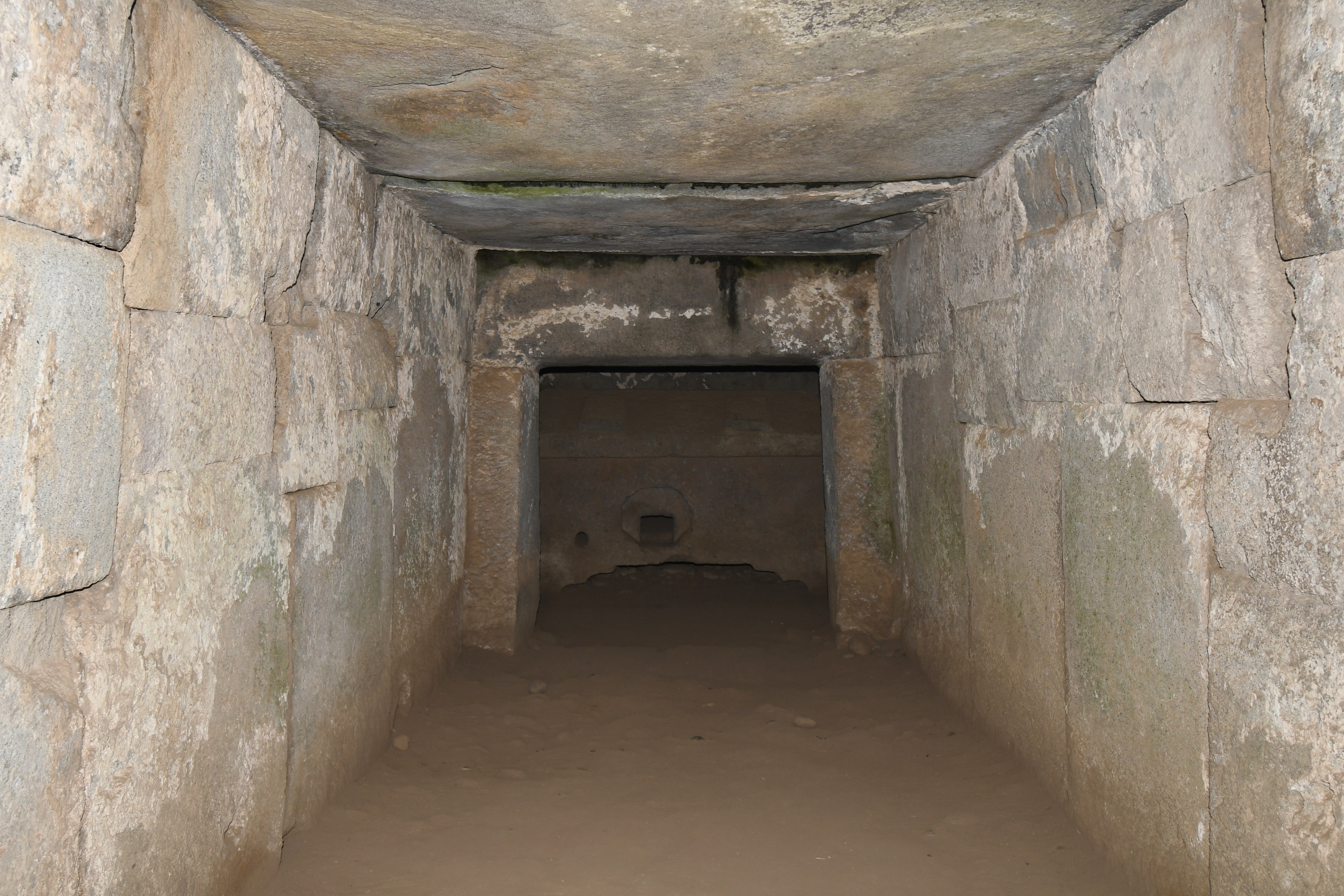
Vestibule (toward the antechamber)

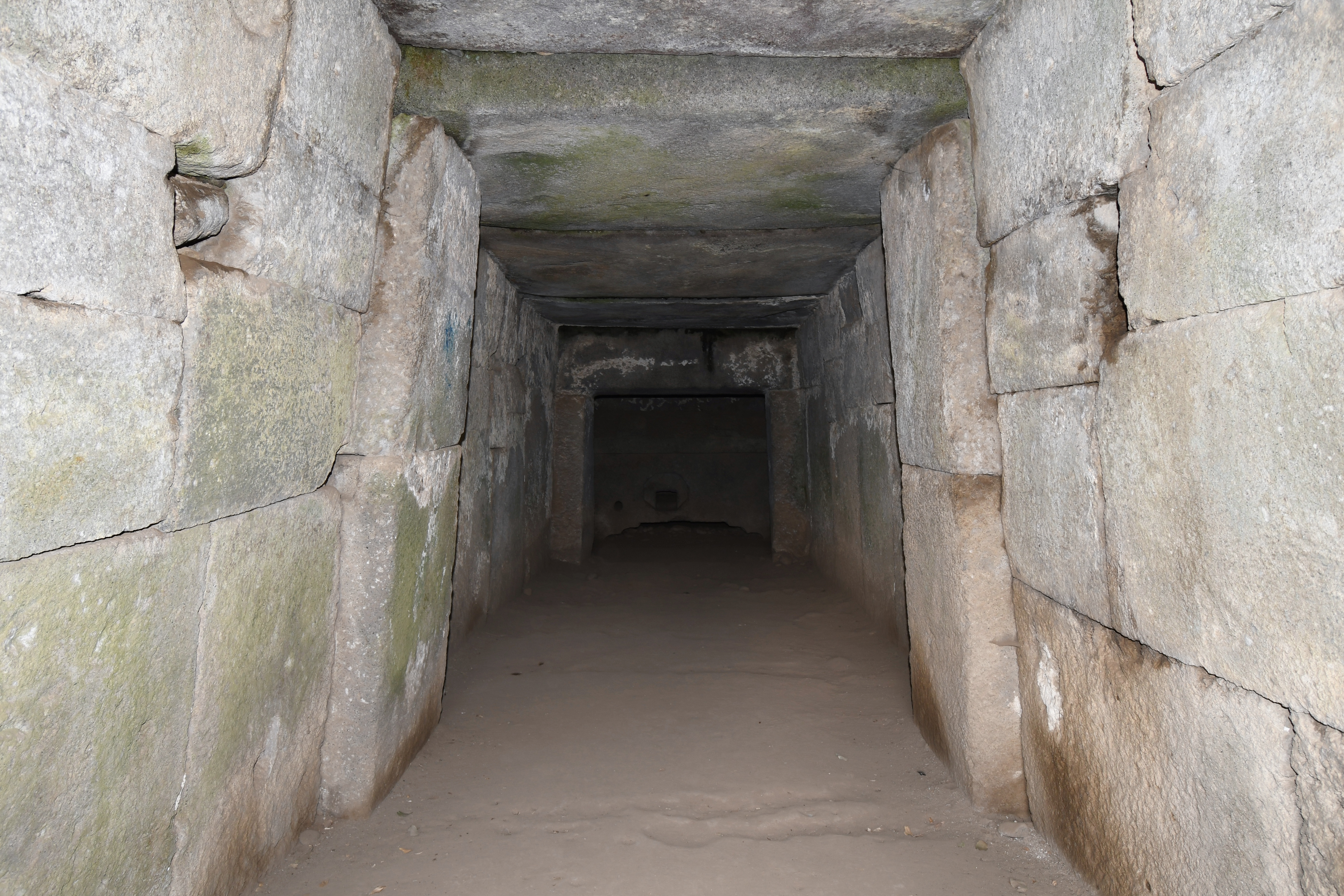
Front gate (toward the antechamber)

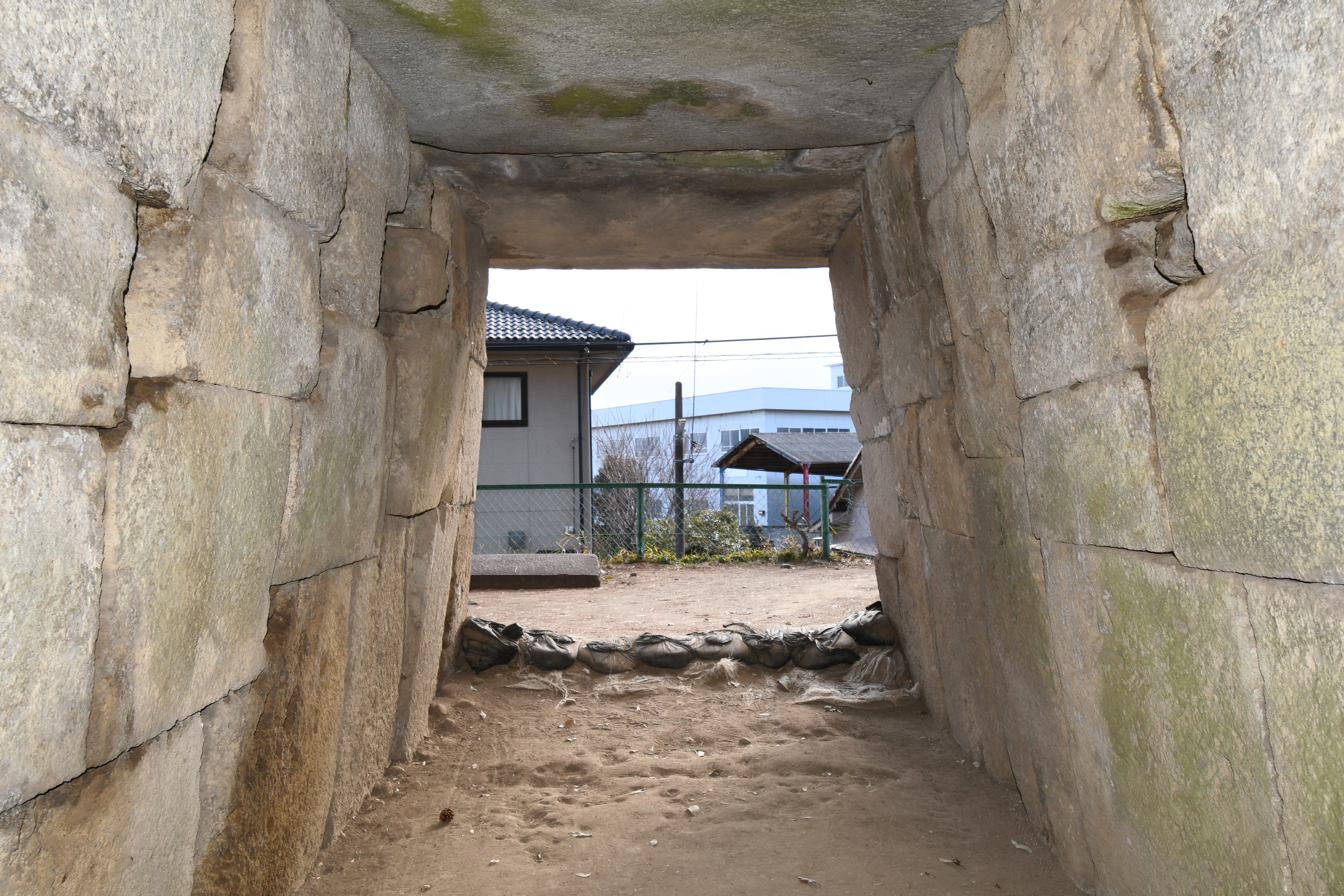
Entrance passage (toward the opening)

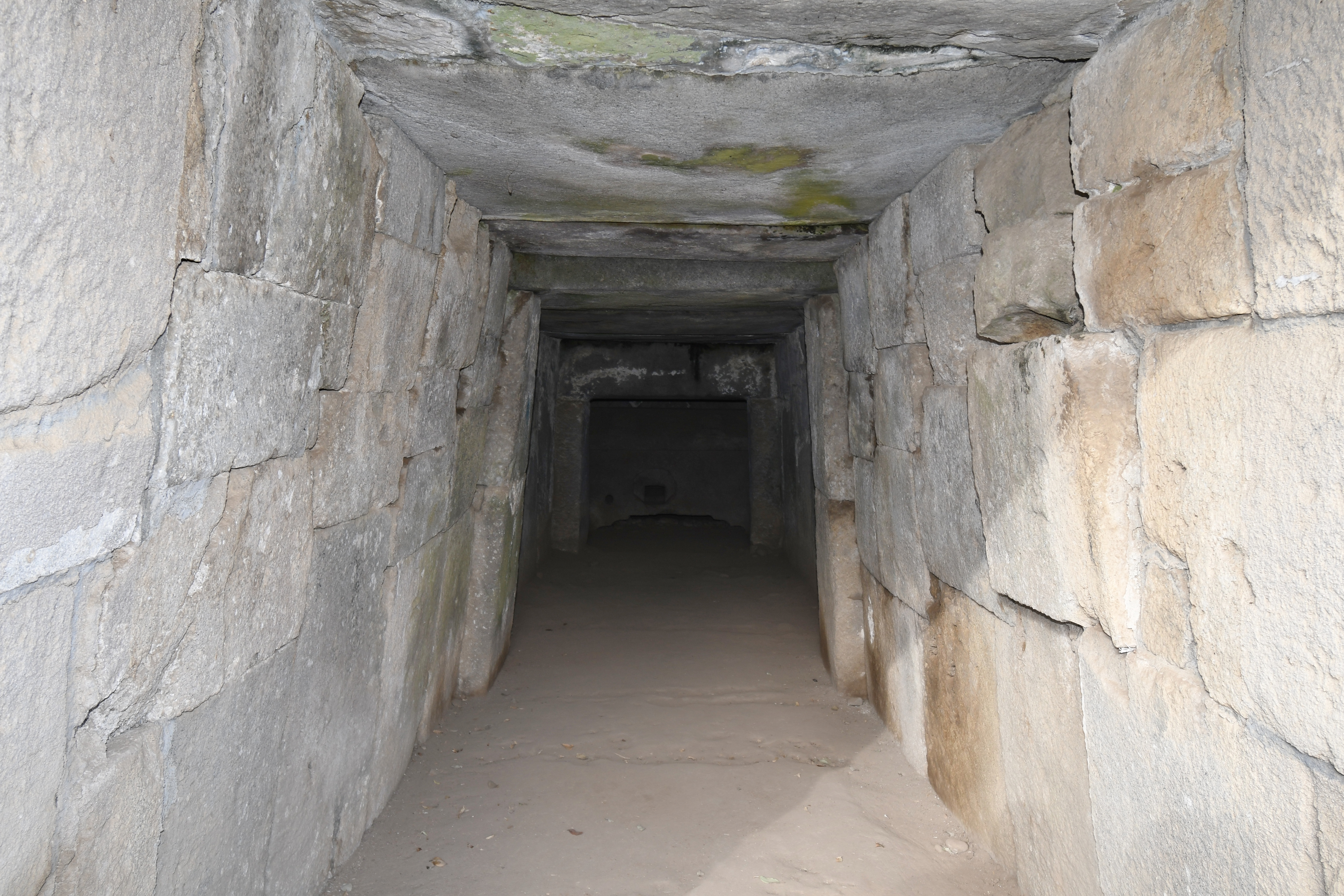
Entrance passage (toward the antechamber)

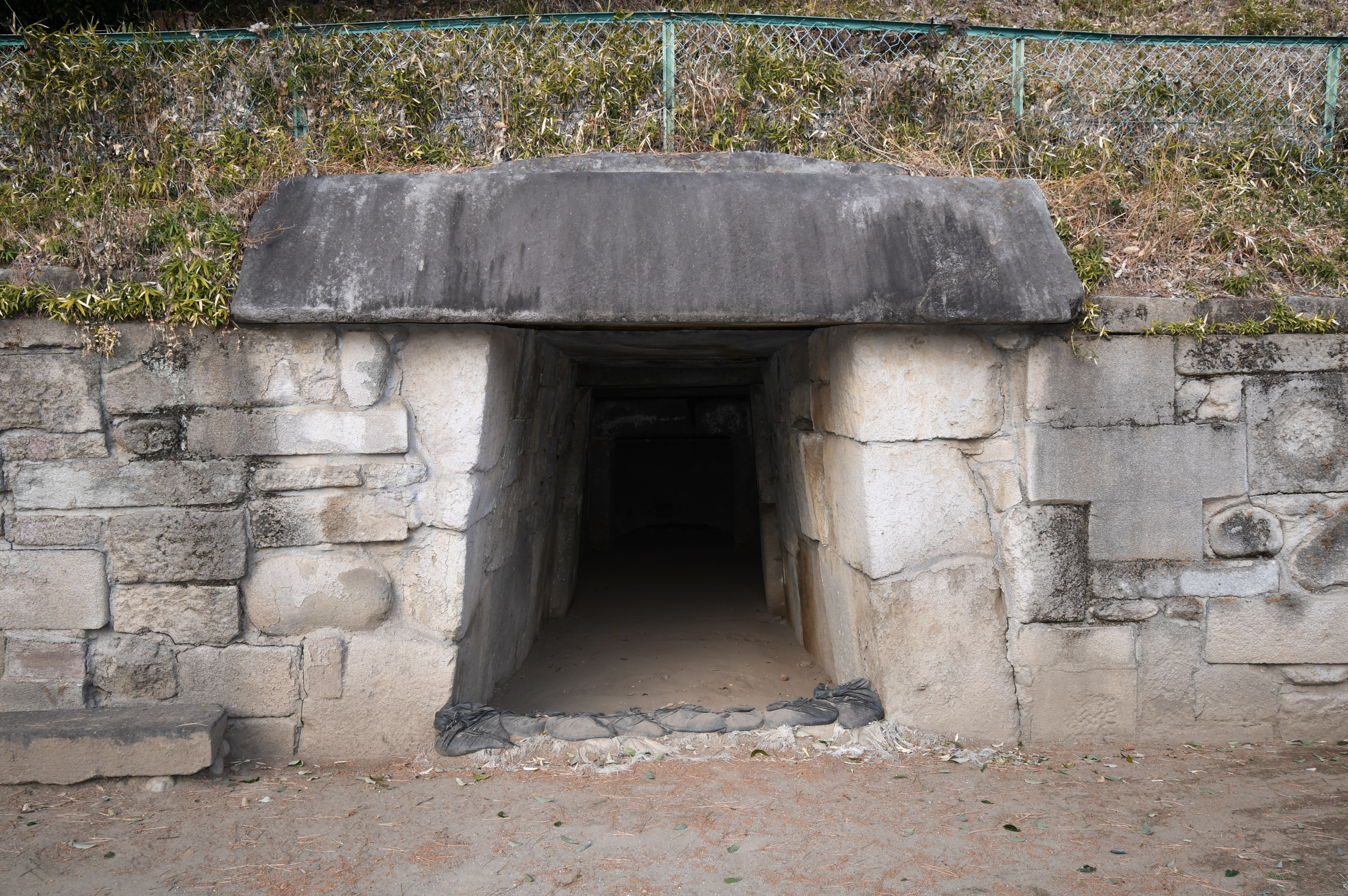
Entrance gate (toward the antechamber)

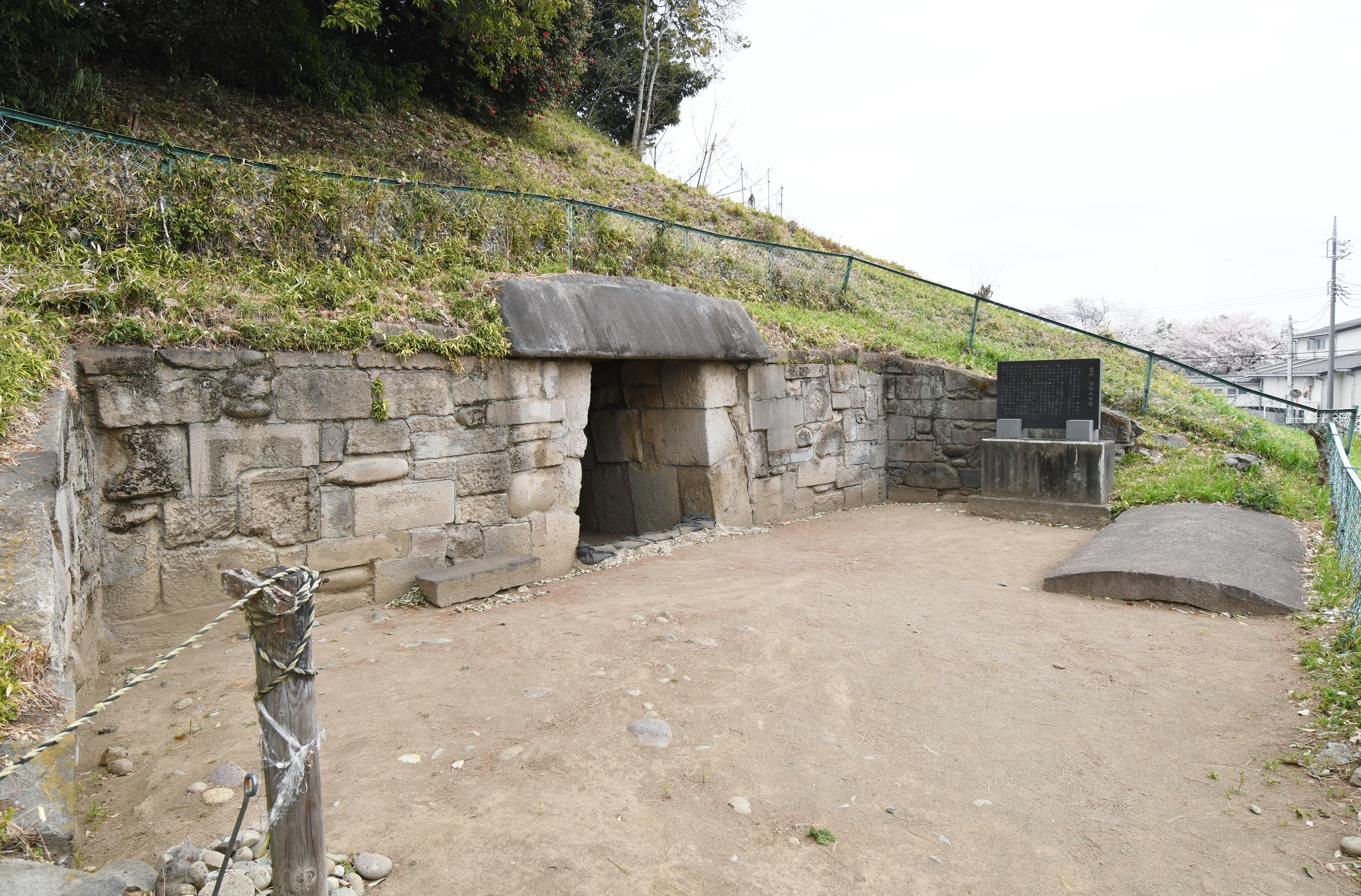
Vestibule

== See also ==
- List of Historic Sites of Japan (Gunma)
