= Kōzuke Kokubun-ji =

- 上野国分寺跡 (Japanese)
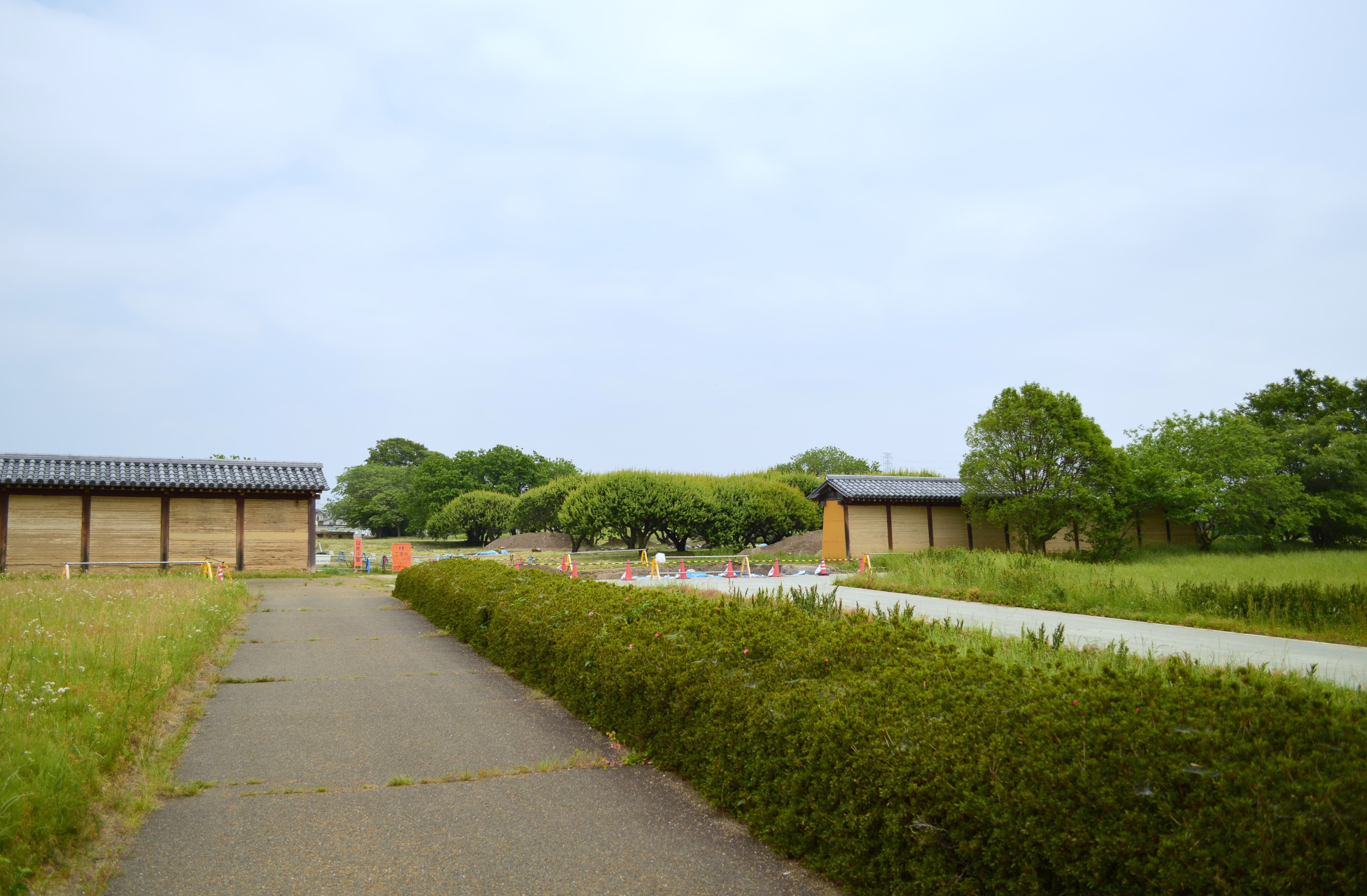
- Reconstructed gate to Kōzuke Kokubun-ji

- Kōzuke Kokubun-ji ruins Kōzuke Kokubun-ji (Japan)
- Interactive map of Kōzuke Kokubun-ji
- 36°23′25.03″N 139°2′8.77″E
- Type: temple ruins
- Periods: Nara period
- Location: Maebashi, Takasaki, Gunma Prefecture, Japan
- Region: Kanto region

History
- Built: c.741AD

The Kōzuke Kokubun-ji (上野国分寺) was a Japanese Buddhist temple located on the border of what is now the cities of Maebashi and Takasaki, Gunma Prefecture, Japan. It was one of the provincial temples established by Emperor Shōmu during the Nara period (710 – 794) for the purpose of promoting Buddhism as the national religion of Japan and standardising control of the imperial rule to the provinces. The temple no longer exists, but the temple grounds were designated as a National Historic Site by the Japanese government in 1926.

== Overview ==
Located in the central part of Gunma Prefecture, the temple site is on a plateau between the Someya River and the Ushiike River at the southeastern foot of Mount Haruna, on the south side of the Kan'etsu Expressway. The area contains a number of ancient ruins, including the Sannō temple ruins, which predates the kokubunji system, and what is believed to be the site of the Kōzuke provincial capital to the east. From 1980 to 1988, excavation and historic site maintenance was carried by the Gunma Prefectural Board of Education, with a second phase taking place from 2012 to 2014. In addition, excavation surveys have been conducted at the site of the Kōzuke Kokubun-niji nunnery ruins since 1969, with an excavation survey conducted by the Takasaki City Board of Education in 2016.

== History ==
The exact foundation date of the temple is unknown, but is believed to have been around 741 AD. Per the Shoku Nihongi, Emperor Shōmu made an offering to the temple in 749 AD, so it must have been at least partially completed by that time. According to the Heian period Engishiki records dated 927 AD, the temple was accorded 50,000 bundles of rice for its upkeep. It is uncertain when the temple was destroyed. The rebellion of Taira no Masakado (Tengyō no Ran) in 939 AD may have been a contributing factor, as local records indicate that the temple was extensively damaged by 1030 AD. By the 14th century, the site of the Lecture Hall had become a graveyard, indicating that the temple was much smaller in scale.

== Layout ==
The area of the temple site is estimated to be 220 meters east-to-west and 235 meters north-to-south. It followed the standardized "kokubunji layout", with a South Gate, Middle Gate, Kondō, and Lecture Hall all arranged on the north–south main axis in a straight line, with a pagoda (estimated to be a seven-storied pagoda) on the west side of Kondō. From the left and right of the Kondō was a cloister that connected to the sides of the middle gate.

The temple site is approximately 4.6 kilometers northwest of the JR East Shin-Maebashi Station.

== Gallery ==
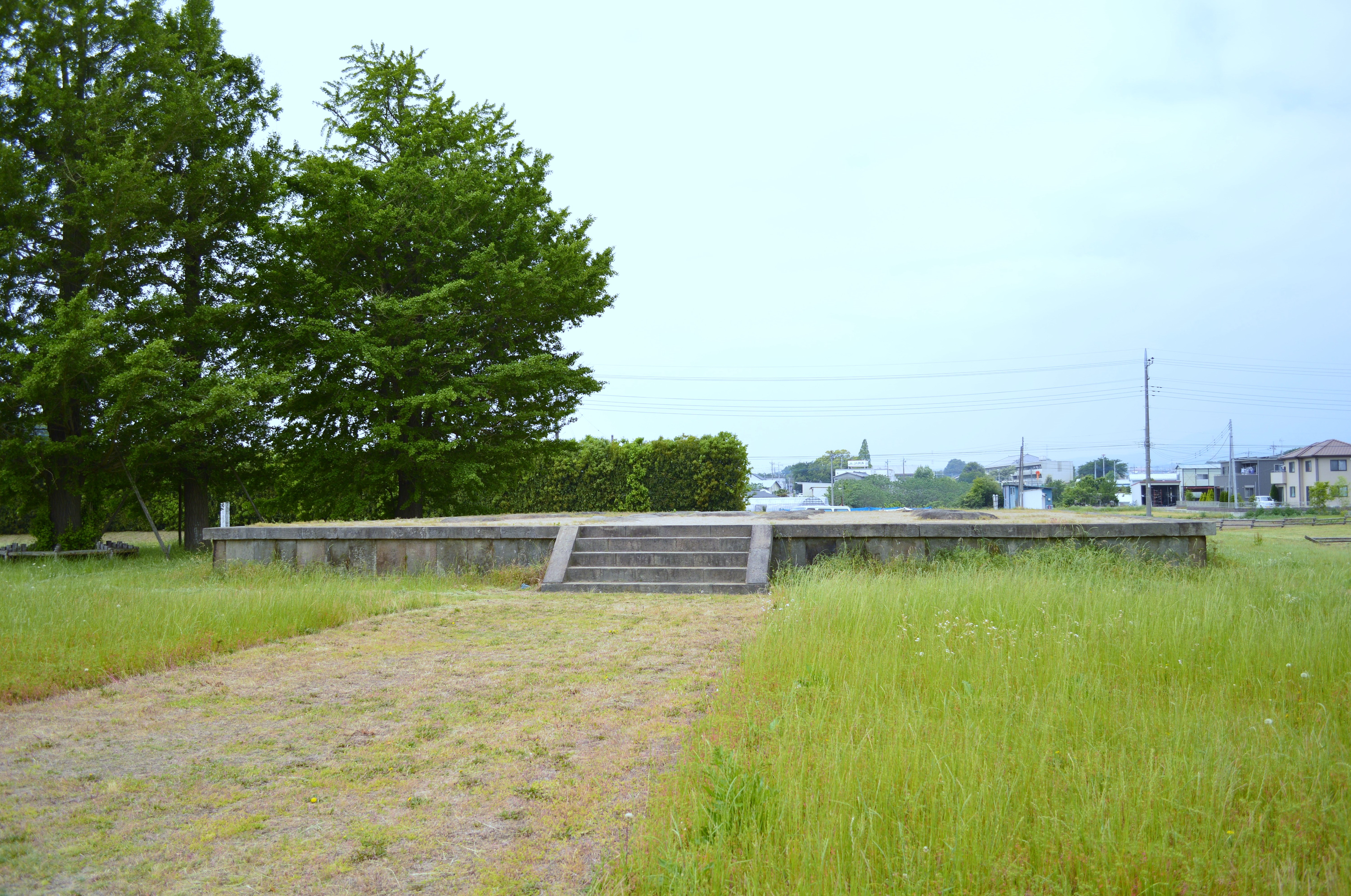
site of the pagoda

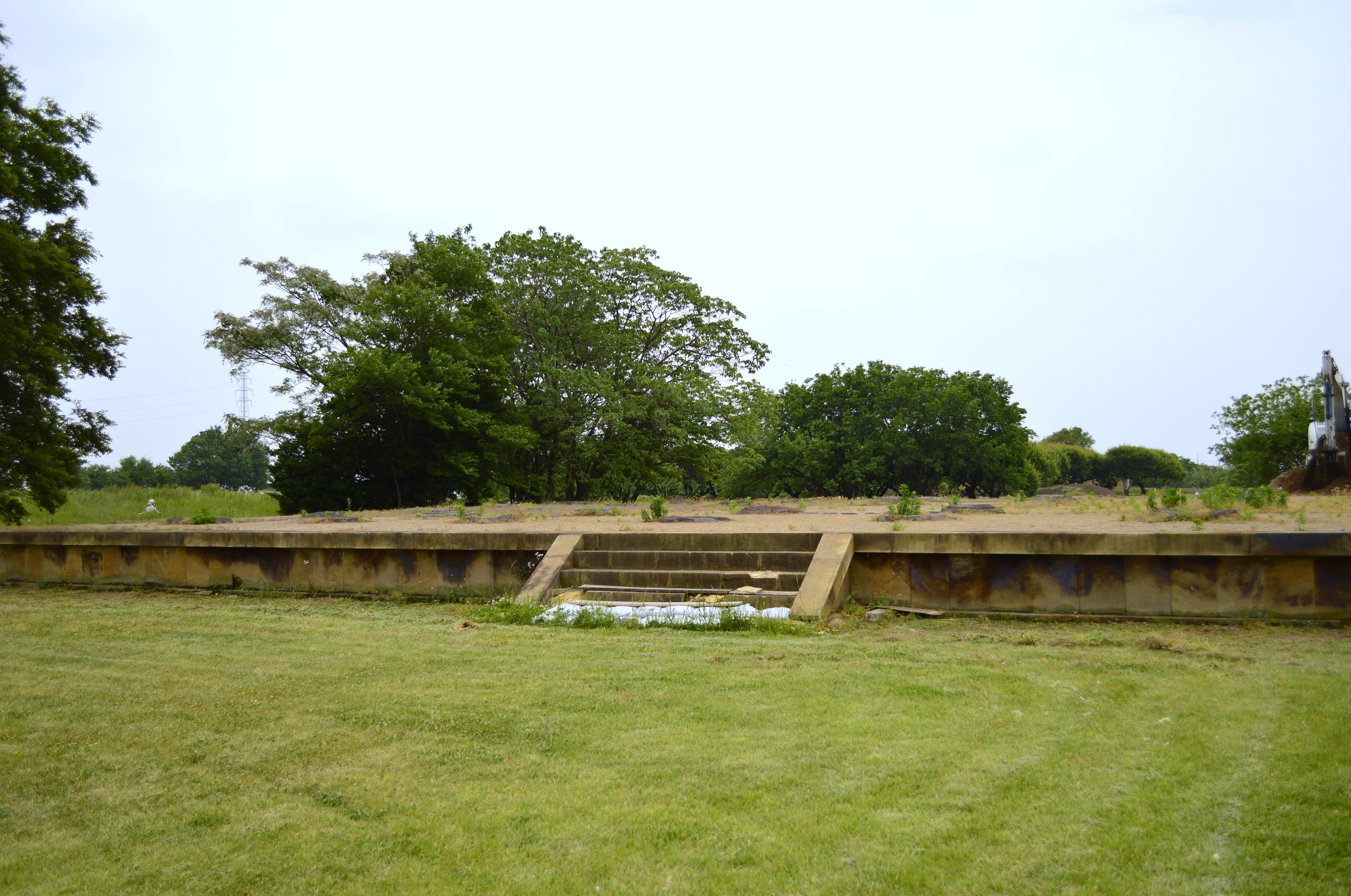
site of the Lecture Hall

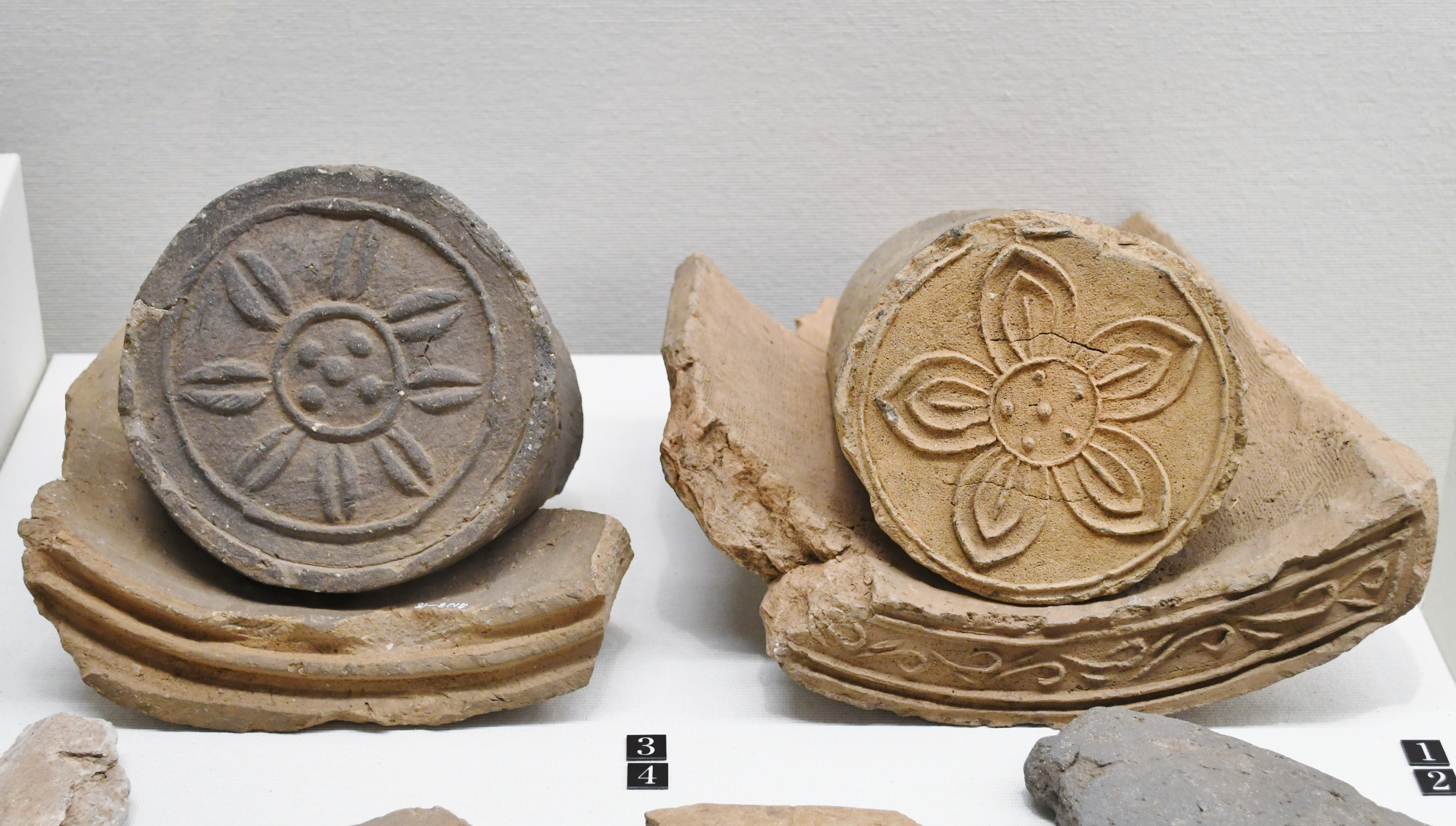
Roof tiles
Gunma Prefectural Museum of History

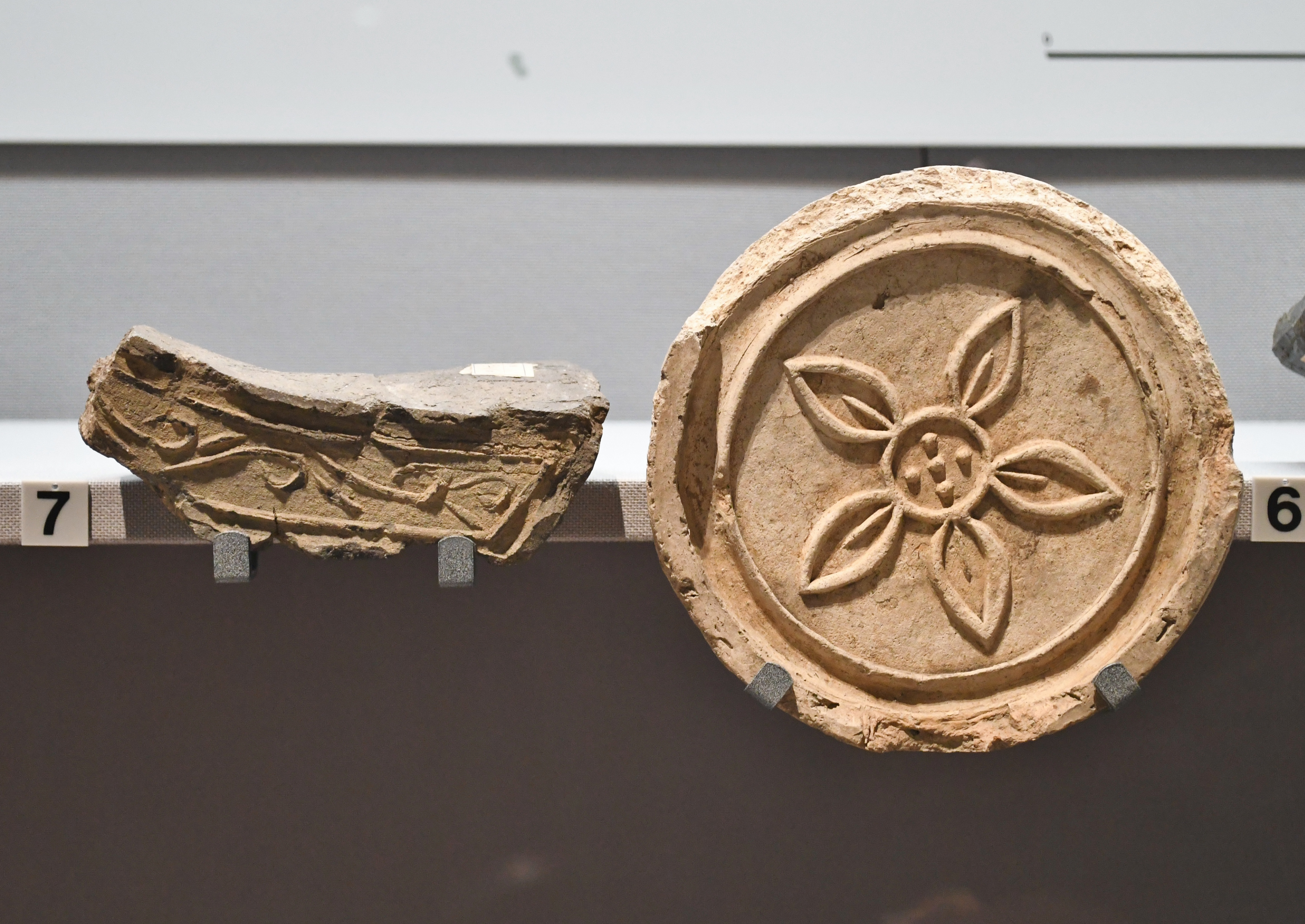
Roof tiles
Tokyo National Museum

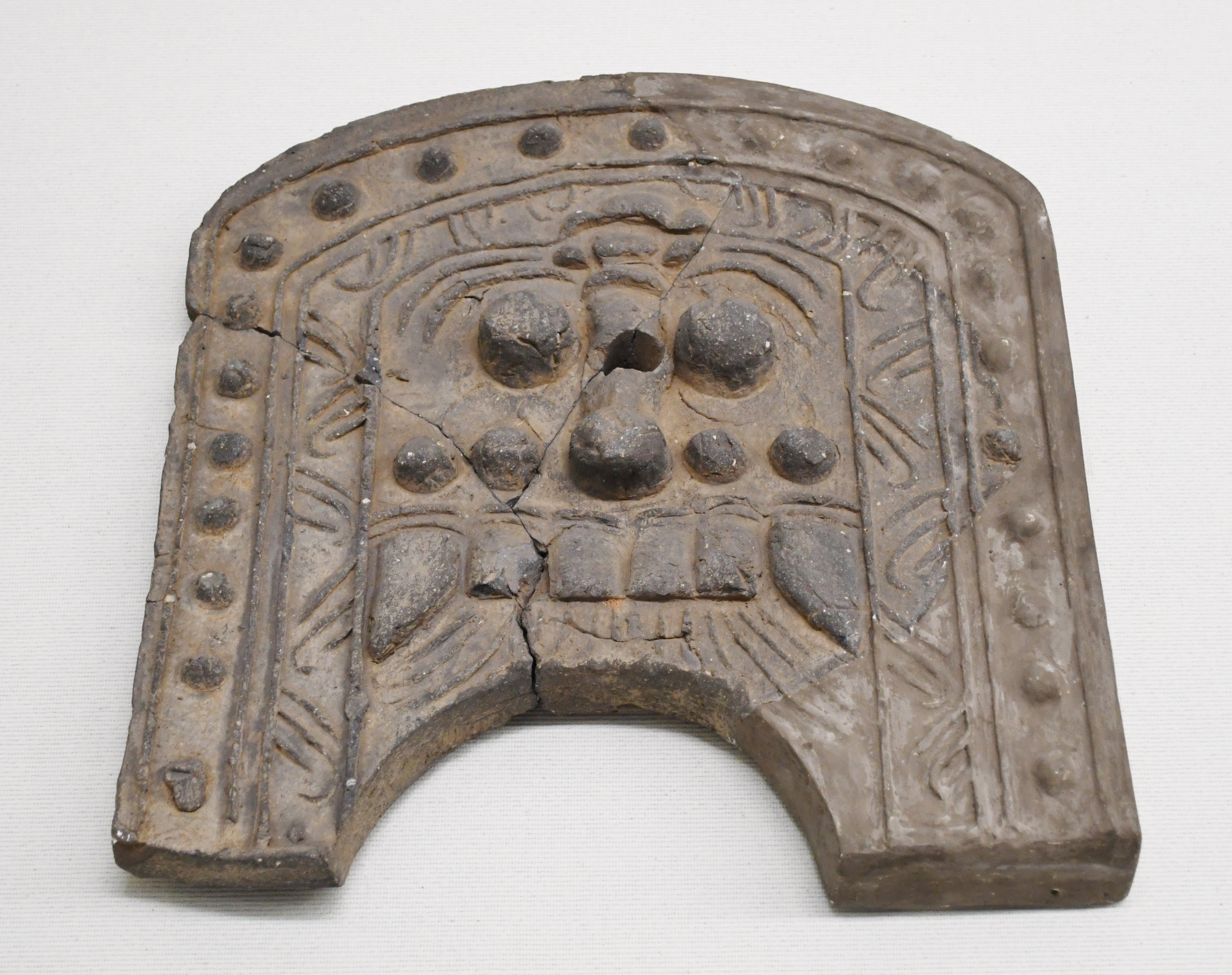
Onigawara
Gunma Prefectural Museum of History

== Kōzuke Kokubun-niji ==
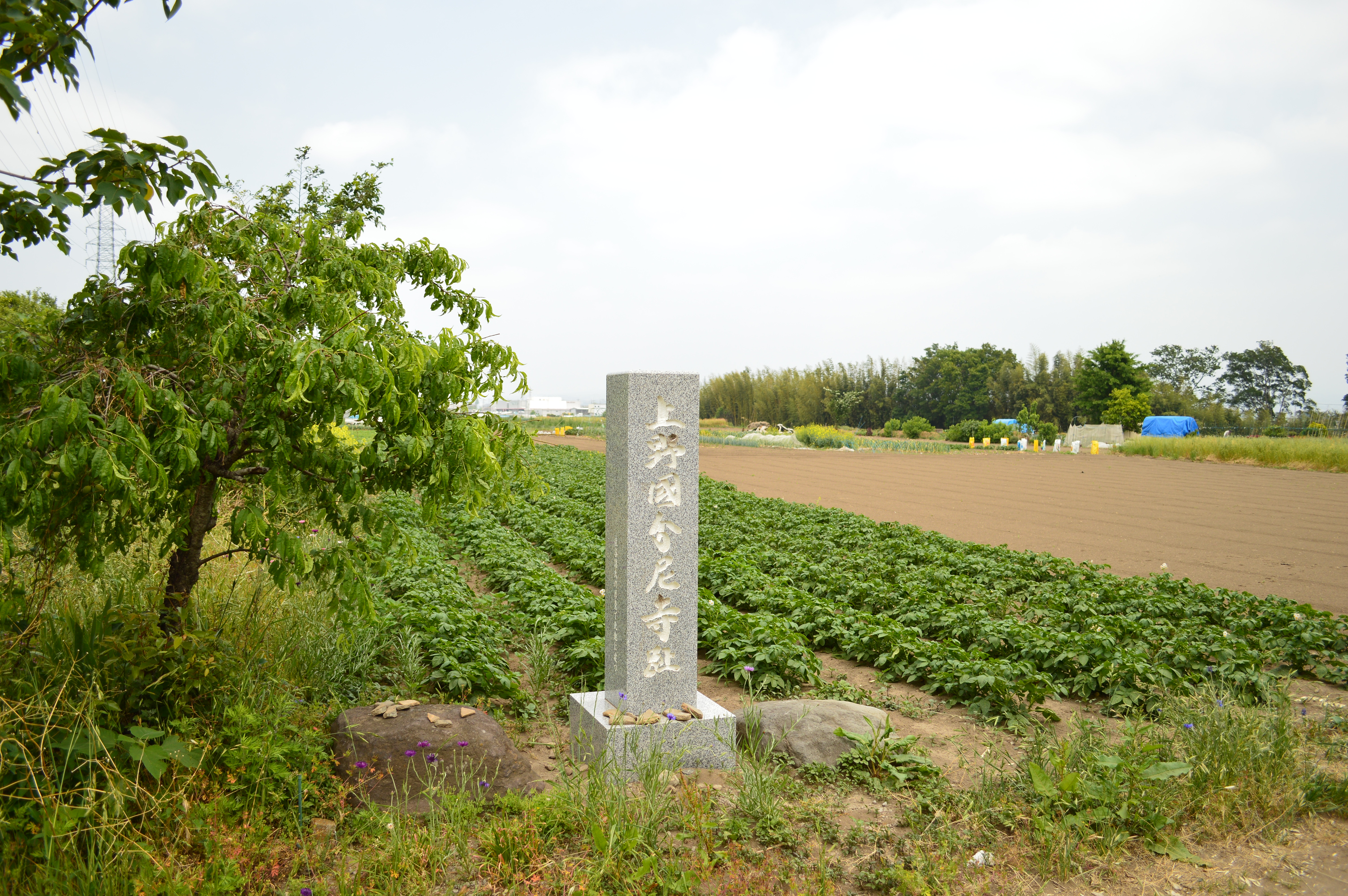
Site of the Kōzuke Kokubun-niji

The ruins of the Kokubun-niji nunnery are located 300 meters east of the Kōzuke Kokubun-ji ruins. It was also established by Emperor Shōmu as part of the kokubunji system. As a result of archaeological excavations survey, the foundations of the Main Hall and the overall layout nunnery have been confirmed. The temple grounds were 162 meters square, with walls on three sides except the west, which was protected only by a ditch. The Main Hall measured about 24 by 13 meters, and had cut tuff stones set in rows for its foundation. The remains of a corridor extended 53.4 meters east-to-west and 41.4 meters north-to-south, with a width of 4.2 meters. It is known that the building had a tiled roof, and from this dating it was determined that Kōzuke Kokubun-niji was built in the mid-8th century, or very close to the same time the construction of Kōzuke Kokubun-ji began. The supply of roof tiles ceased by the early 10th century, and it is believed that the nunnery had been abandoned by the 11th century. The Kōzuke Kokubun-niji was designated a National Historic Site in 2024.

== See also ==
- List of Historic Sites of Japan (Gunma)
- provincial temple
