= Sannō temple ruins =

- 山王廃寺跡
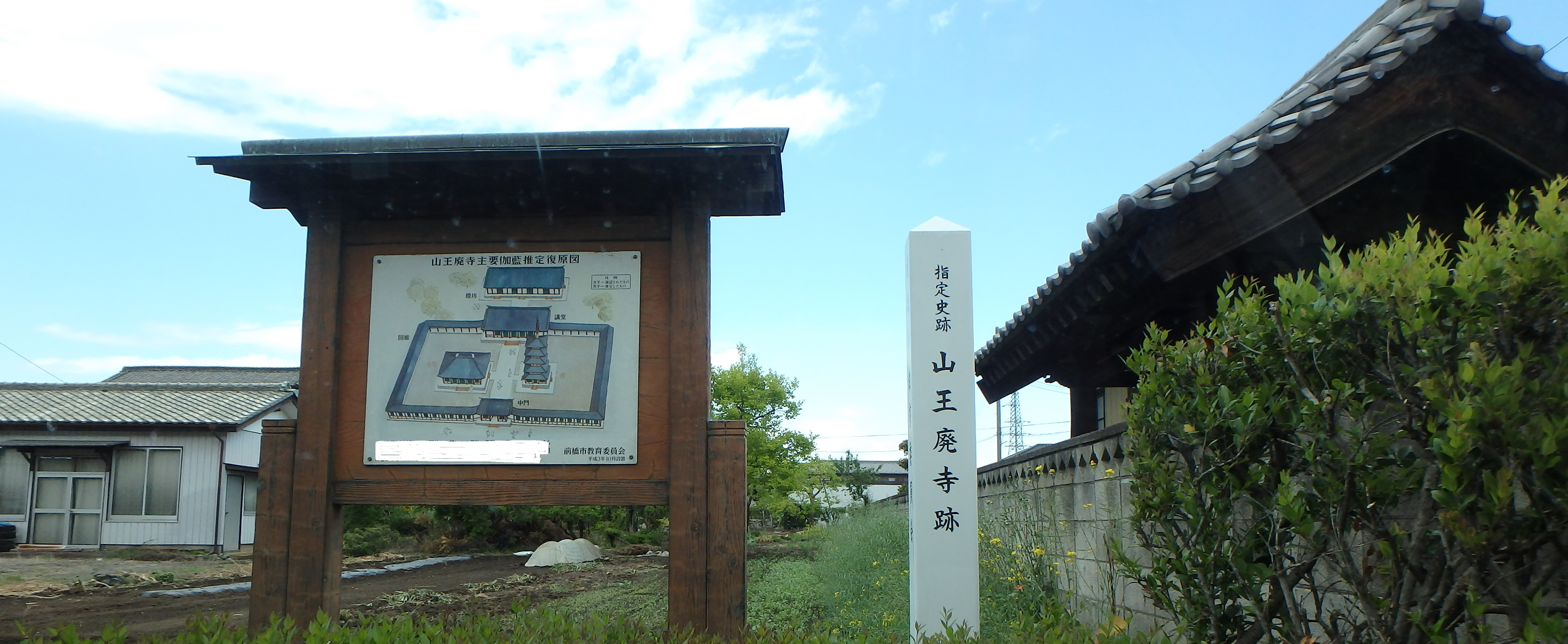
- Sannō temple ruins

- Location within Gunma Prefecture Location within Japan

Religion
- Affiliation: Buddhist
- Deity: unknown
- Rite: unknown
- Status: ruins (no public facilities)

Location
- Location: Maebashi, Gunma
- Country: Japan
- Interactive map of Sannō temple ruins
- Coordinates: 36°24′02″N 139°02′39″E

Architecture
- Completed: Hakuho period

Sannō temple ruins (山王廃寺跡, Sannō Haiji ato) is an archaeological site with the ruins of a Buddhist temple located in what is now the Sōja neighborhood of city of Maebashi, Gunma, Japan. The temple no longer exists, but the temple grounds were designated as a National Historic Site by the Japanese government in 1928, with the designated area extended in 2008.

== Overview ==
The site is located on slightly elevated ground between the Hachiman River and the Ushiike River, which flows from the southeastern foot of Mount Haruna through the central part of Gunma Prefecture. The Kan'etsu Expressway is about 0.6 kilometers to the west and Japan National Route 17 is to the south. The ruins were discovered in 1921 when the foundation of the pagoda was discovered. Subsequent archaeological excavations from 1974 to 1981 and 2006 to 2010 revealed that it was the oldest temple ruin in the Jōmō area (present-day Gunma and Tochigi Prefectures), and one of the earliest in the Kantō region.

The temple area is surrounded by a cloister that is 79.7 meters east-to-west and 81 meters north-to-south. The arrangement of buildings was based on that of Hōkō-ji in Asuka, Nara, with the Kondō in the west, the pagoda in the east, and the Lecture Hall to the north, with the cloister connecting the Middle Gate with then Lecture Hall, forming a courtyard surrounding the Kondō and pagoda. The Kondō is approximately 20 meters square. The Lecture Hall was 37.8 by 24.5 meters and the pagoda had a foundation 12.5 meters square. The pagoda cornerstone was especially large, with a diameter of 2.5 to 2.7 meters and a thickness of more than 1.5 meters, and its surface was cut off smoothly. In the center of the stone, a hole with a diameter of about 65 centimeters for the central pillar was pierced.

During excavation, the many roof tiles labeled "Kokou-ji" and "Hōkō" were found, and it became clear that Sannō temple ruins corresponded to the temple of Hōkō-ji mentioned in ancient literature and whose name was written on the Yamanoue Stele. From the various styles of roof tiles, it is estimated that the temple existed from the second half of the 7th century to the 11th century. Other artifacts included green-glazed pottery shards, bowls, please and other earthenware, a copper dragon, and numerous fragments of clay votive statues. Some of these artifacts have been designated as National Important Cultural Properties of Japan, including the pagoda foundation stone a brass bowl, four green glazed plates three green glazed bowls and a green glazed water container.

The site is located in a residential area and there are no public facilities.

== See also ==
- List of Historic Sites of Japan (Gunma)
