= Nakatsuka Kofun (Kiryū) =

Kofun period burial mound in Gunma, Japan

- 中塚古墳 (Japanese)
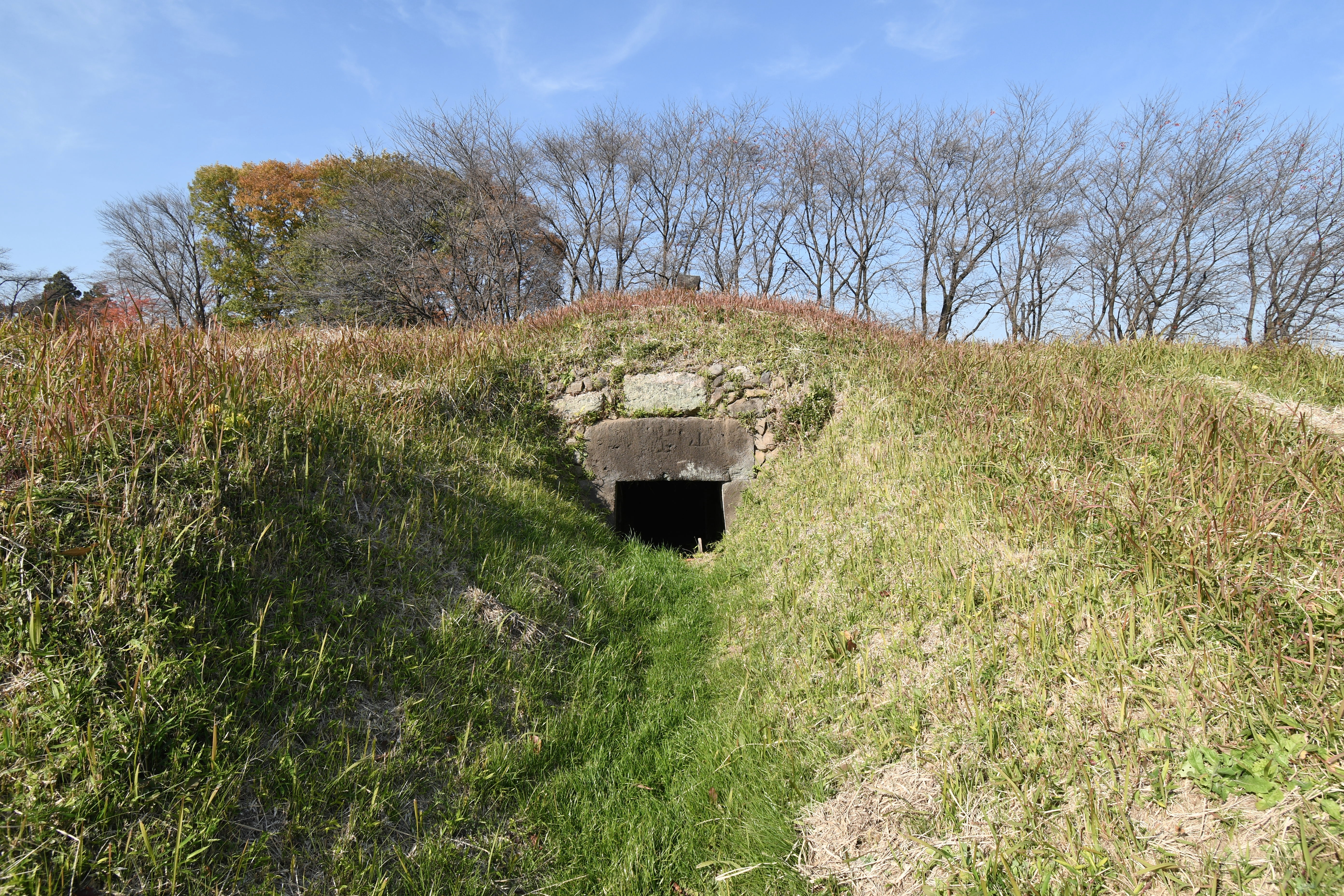
- Nakatsuka Kofun

- Nakatsuka Kofun Nakatsuka Kofun (Kiryū) (Japan)
- 36°25′24.30″N 139°14′39.22″E
- Type: Kofun
- Periods: Kofun period
- Location: Niisatocho Nikkawa, Kiryū, Gunma
- Region: Kantō region

History
- Built: late 7th century

Site notes
- Public access: Yes
- Gunma Prefecture Historic Site

The Nakatsuka Kofun (中塚古墳) is a Kofun period burial mound, located in the Niisatocho Nikkawa neighborhood of the city of Kiryū, Gunma in the Kantō region of Japan. The tumulus was designated a Gunma Prefecture Historic Site in 1979.

== Overview ==
The Nakatsuka Kofun is an hōfun (方墳)-style square kofun constructed on a hill at the southeastern foot of Mount Akagi in eastern Gunma Prefecture. The mound is square in shape, measuring approximately 37 meters on each side. Fukiishi revetment stones are visible on the outer surface of the mound, which is surrounded by a moat.

The burial chamber is a double-chambered horizontal-entry stone chamber with a total length of 7.67 meters, opening to the south-southeast, built using cut andesite masonry. The chamber itself measures 4.16 to 4.18 meters long by 1.84 meters wide at the back wall and has a height of 1.74 meters. The passageway is 3.10 meters long and 1.31 meters wide and is separated fro the burial chamber by a gate. The burial chamber has been open since antiquity, and no grave goods have been found.

The construction period based on the construction method is estimated to be around the late 7th century, the end of the Kofun period. The identity of the person buried is unknown, but there is a known theory that this was the tumulus of the "Niikawa-omi" clan, as mentioned in the Yamanoue Stele in Takasaki. This stele records the marriage relationship and genealogy of Niikawa-omi and Ōko-omi clans Kōzuke Province and is dated 681.

The tumulus is approximately one kilometers northeast of the Jōmō Line Niisato Station.

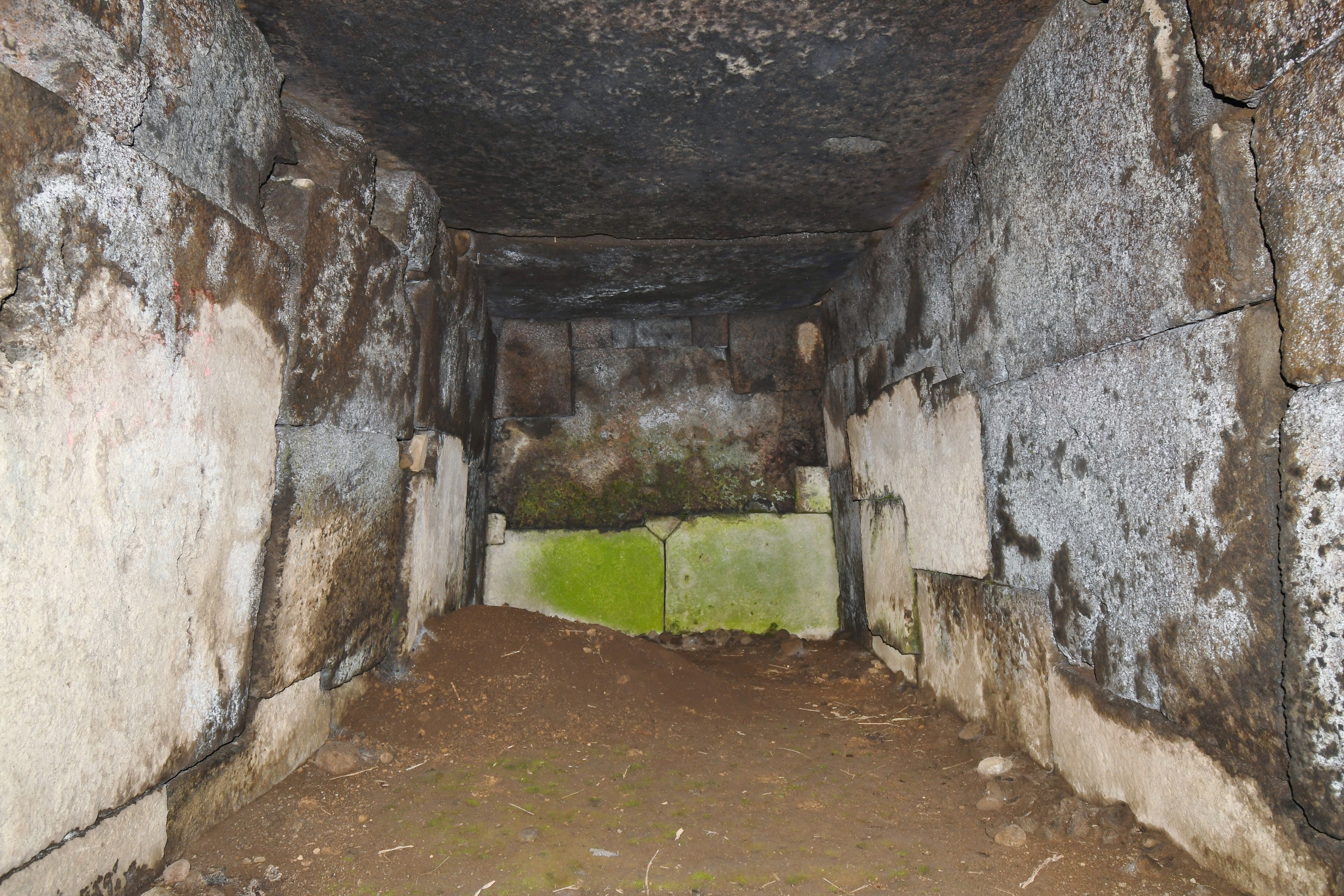
Burial Chamber (towards the back wall)

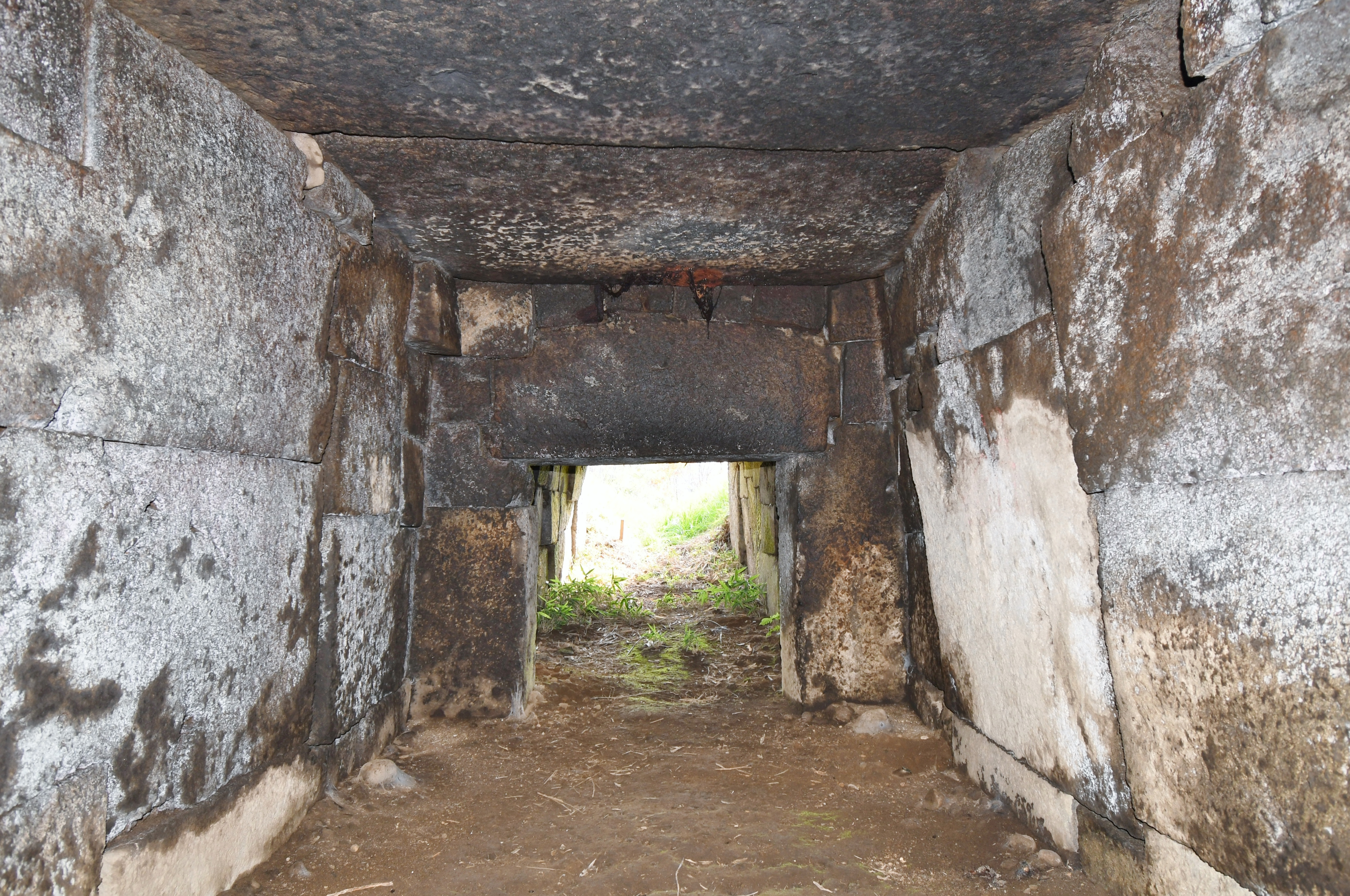
Burial Chamber (towards the opening)

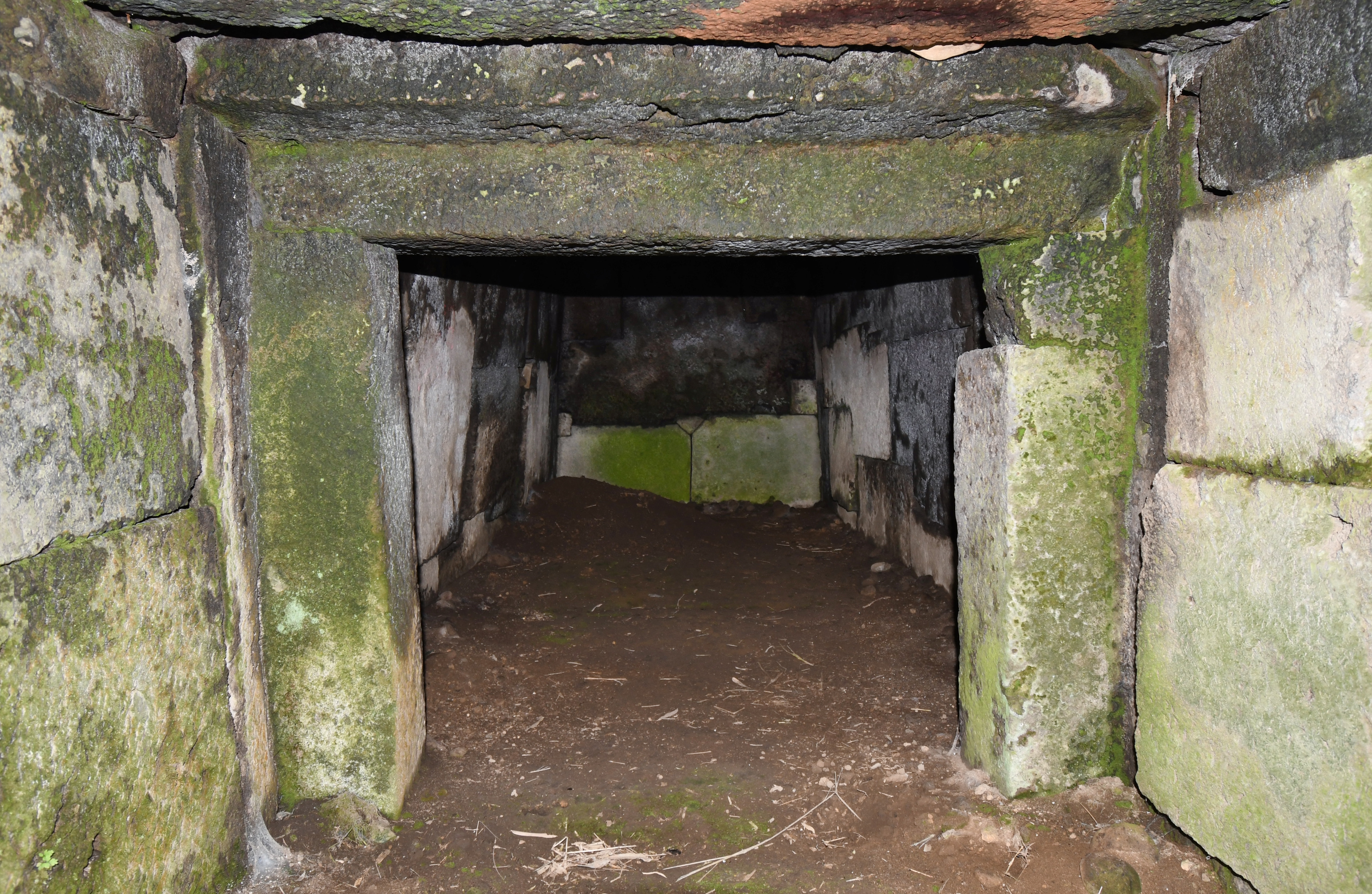
Entrance Gate (towards the burial chamber)

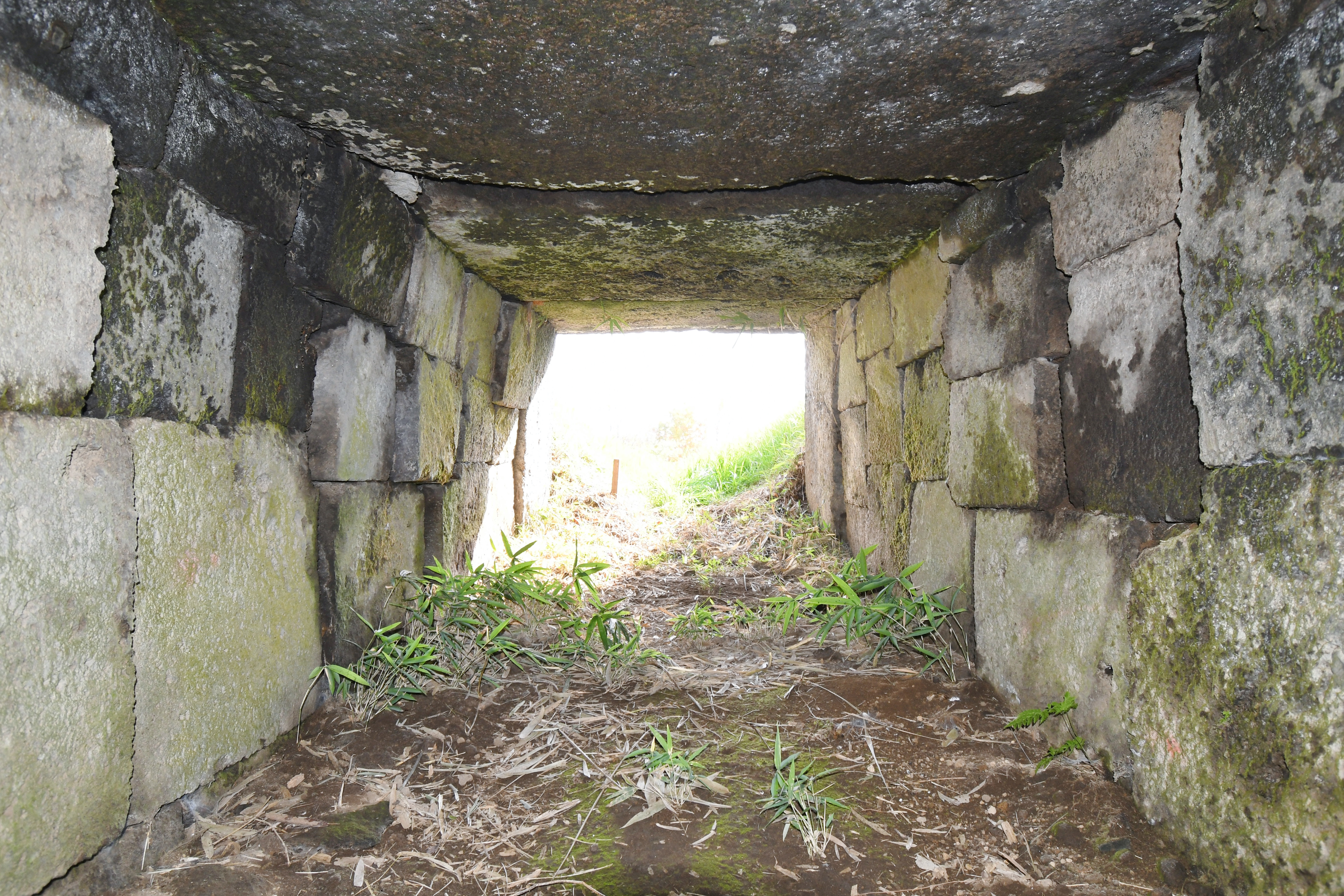
Entrance Passage (towards the opening)

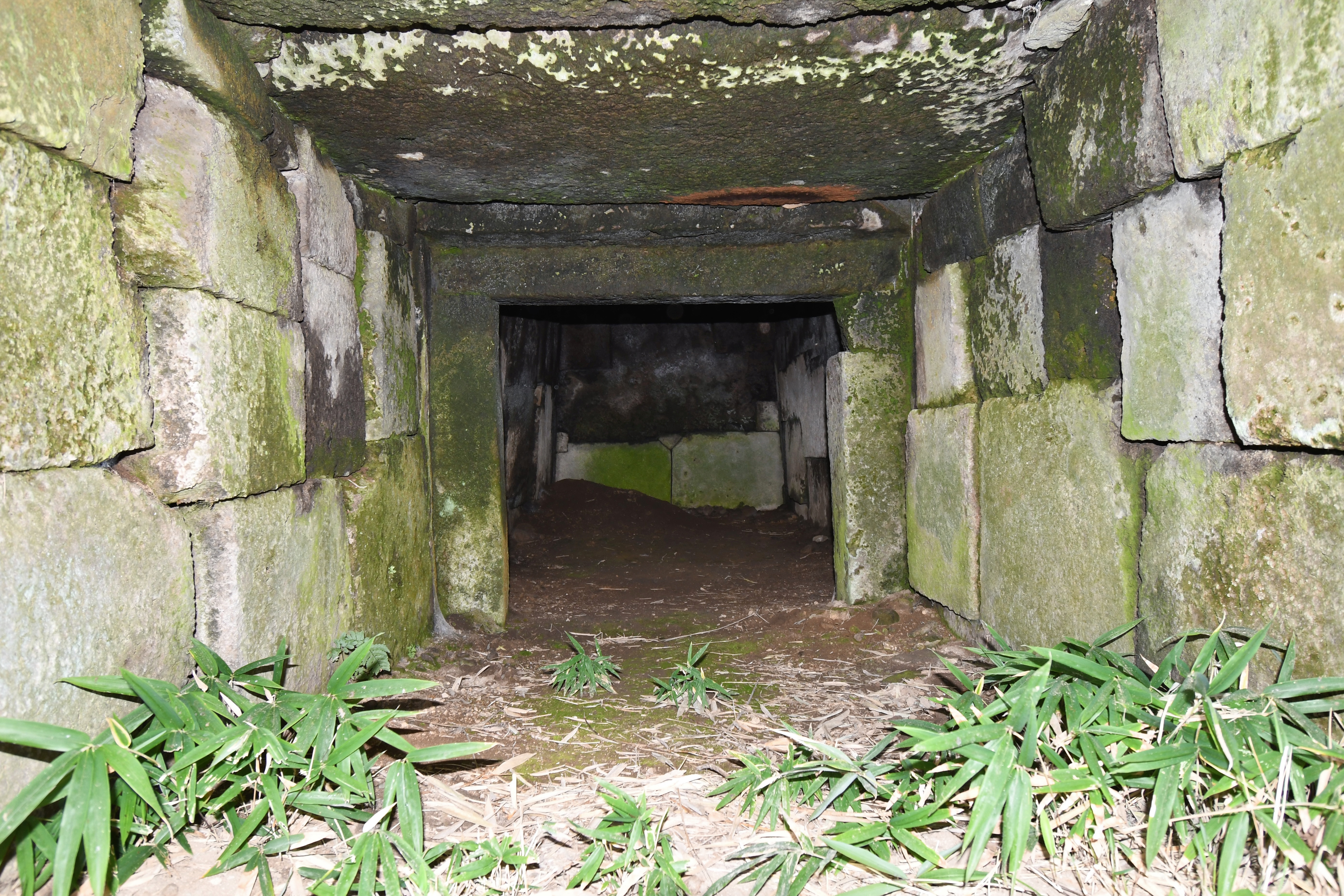
Entrance Passage (towards the burial chamber)

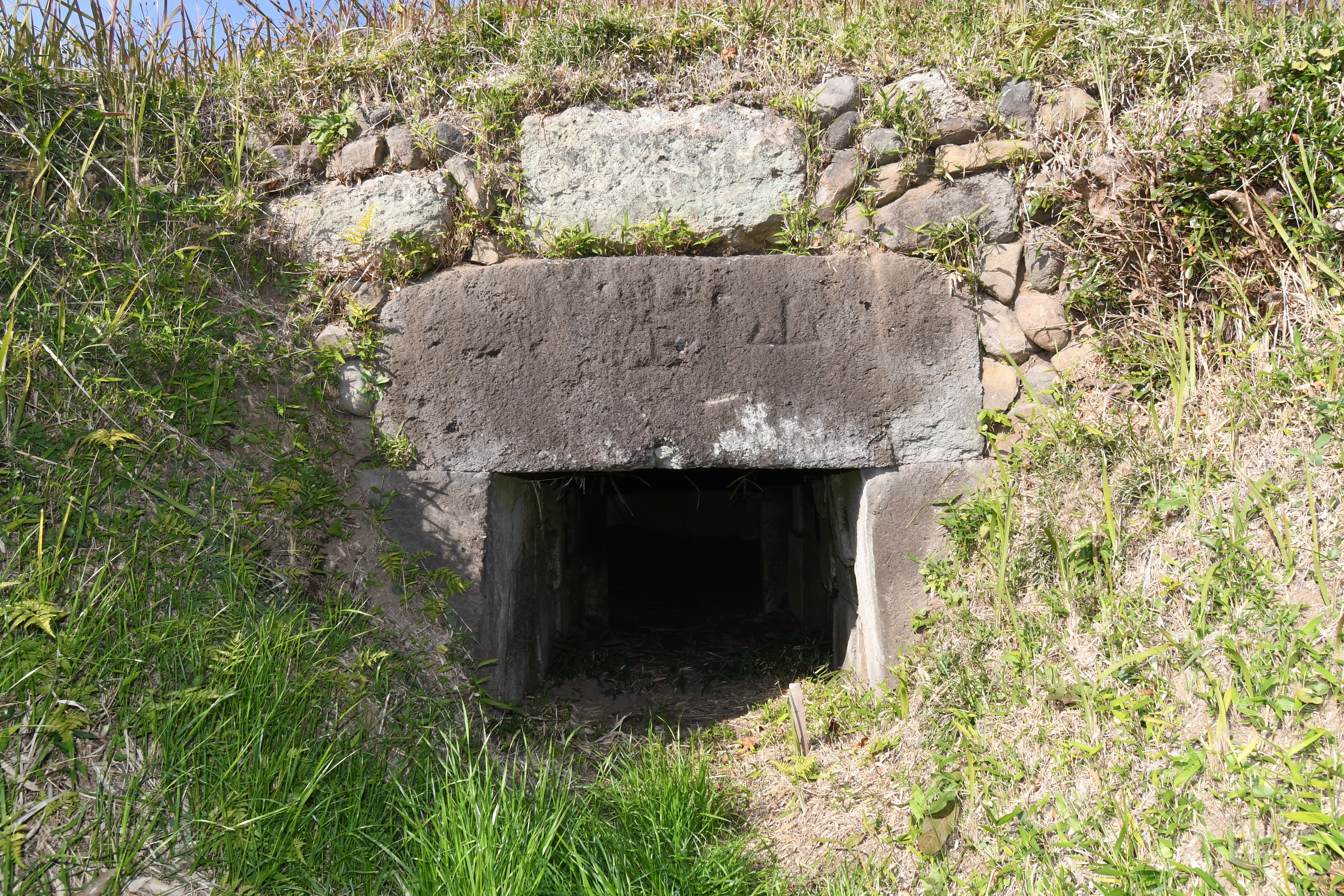
Entrance

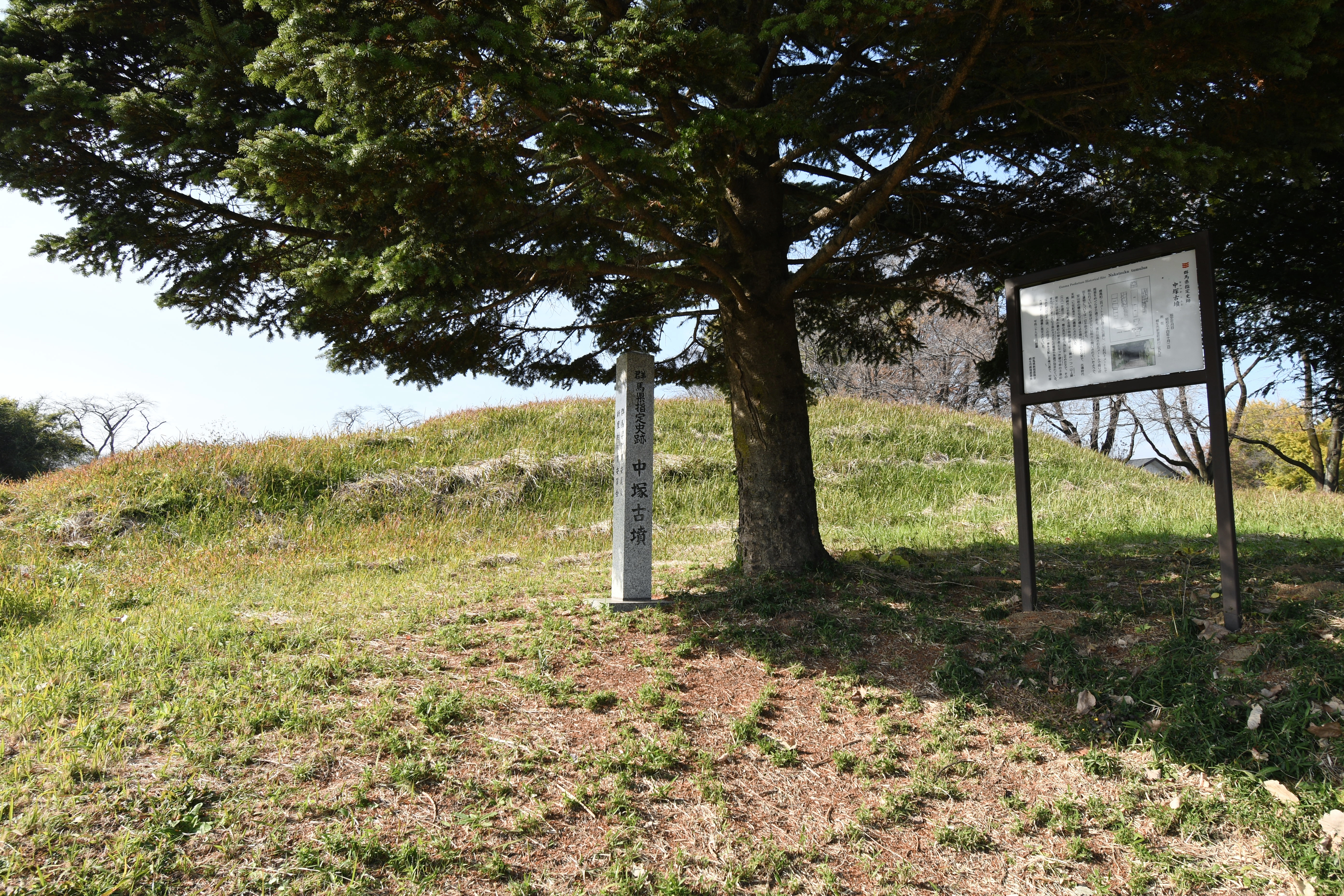
Overview

== See also ==
- List of Historic Sites of Japan (Gunma)
