= Horikoshi Kofun =

Kofun period burial mound in Gunma, Japan

- 堀越古墳 (Japanese)
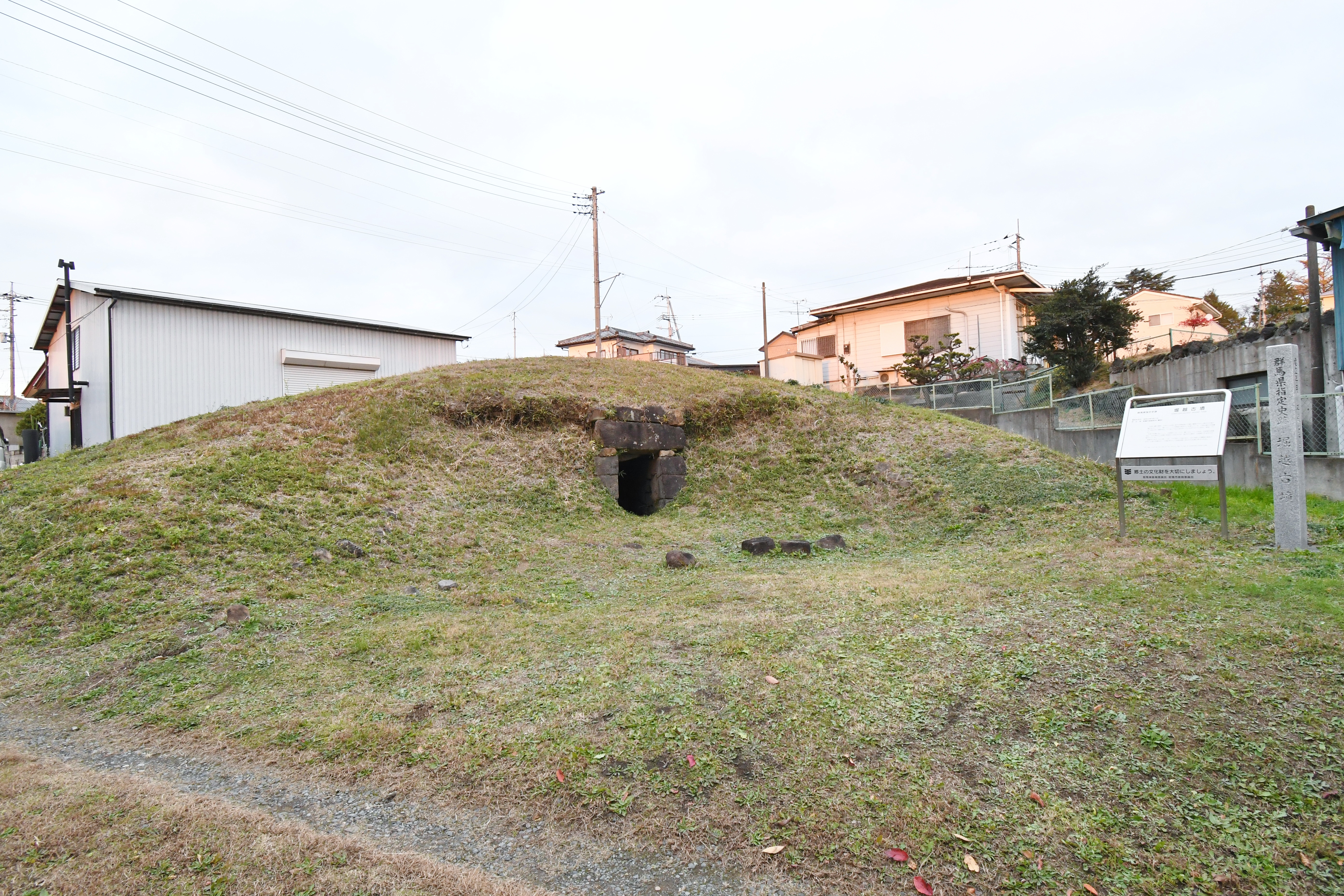
- Horikoshi Kofun

- Horikoshi Kofun Horikoshi Kofun (Japan)
- 36°24′49.25″N 139°8′55.3″E
- Type: Kofun
- Periods: Kofun period
- Location: 861-1 Horikoshi-cho, Maebashi, Gunma
- Region: Kantō region

History
- Built: late 7th century

Site notes
- Public access: Yes (no facilities)
- Gunma Prefecture Historic Site

The Horikoshi Kofun (堀越古墳) is a Kofun period burial mound, located in the Horikoshi neighborhood of the city of Maebashi, Gunma in the Kantō region of Japan. The tumulus was designated a Gunma Prefecture Historic Site in 1973..

== Overview ==
The Horikoshi Kofun is constructed on a gently sloping surface approximately 150 meters above sea level on the middle of a plateau at the southern foot of Mount Akagi in central Gunma Prefecture. It was extensively excavated in 1869, and further excavations, primarily focusing on the forecourt, were conducted in 1972.

The mound is an enpun (円墳)-style circular tumulus, measuring 25 meters in diameter. No haniwa clay figures have been found on the outer surface of the mound A 2.5-meter-wide moat surrounds the south side of the mound, but none is found on the higher elevation north side. The burial facility is a double-chambered horizontal-entry stone burial chamber, which consists of a main chamber, a passage, and a forecourt, constructed using cut stone masonry. The chamber has a total length of 6.93 meters with the chamber proper measuring 3.2 by 1.88 meters with a height of 2.10 meters and the passageway having a length of 3.2 meters. The burial chamber and entrance passage are separated by a gate, which shows intricate craftsmanship. The forecourt is trapezoidal, measuring 3.55 meters wide in front and 5.60 meters in back, and 8.00 meters long. The stone material of the burial chamber is andesite.

In addition to the discovery of a small knife and other grave goods during the excavation in 1869 (whereabouts currently unknown), investigations of the forecourt in 1972 found two Haji ware bowls and a Sue ware bowl lid adjacent to the stone walls on either side. The construction period is estimated to be the late 7th century to the early 8th century, during the end of the Kofun period. The identity of the person buried is unknown, but some theories suggest a connection to "Ōgo no Omi," mentioned in the Yamanoue Stele (National Special Historic Site), as this kofun was formerly known as "Ōgo-machi Tumulus No. 15" in local records.

The Horikoshi Kofun is located approximately 1.1 kilometers northwest of the Jōmō Line Ōgo Station.

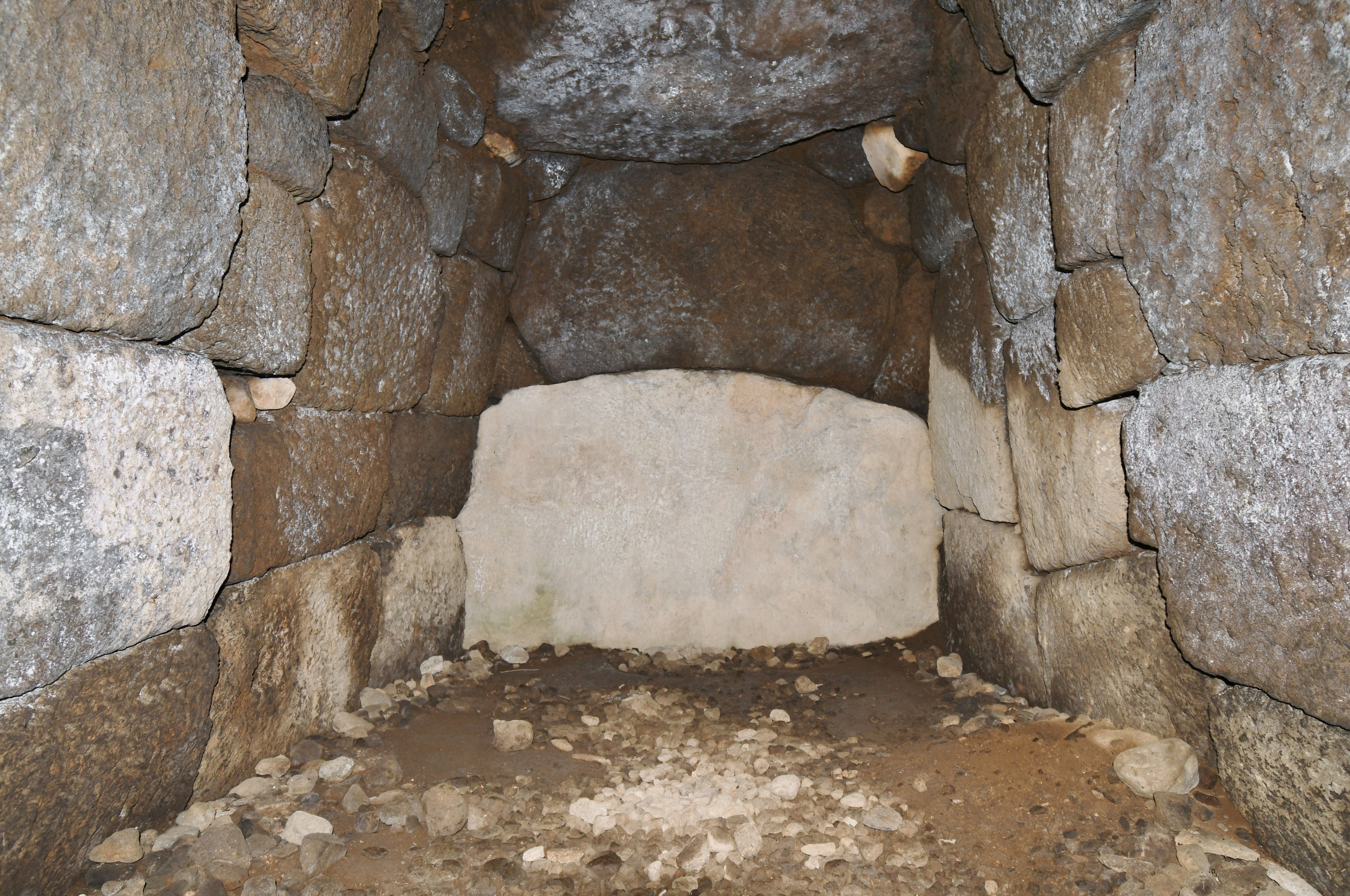
Burial Chamber (towards the back wall)

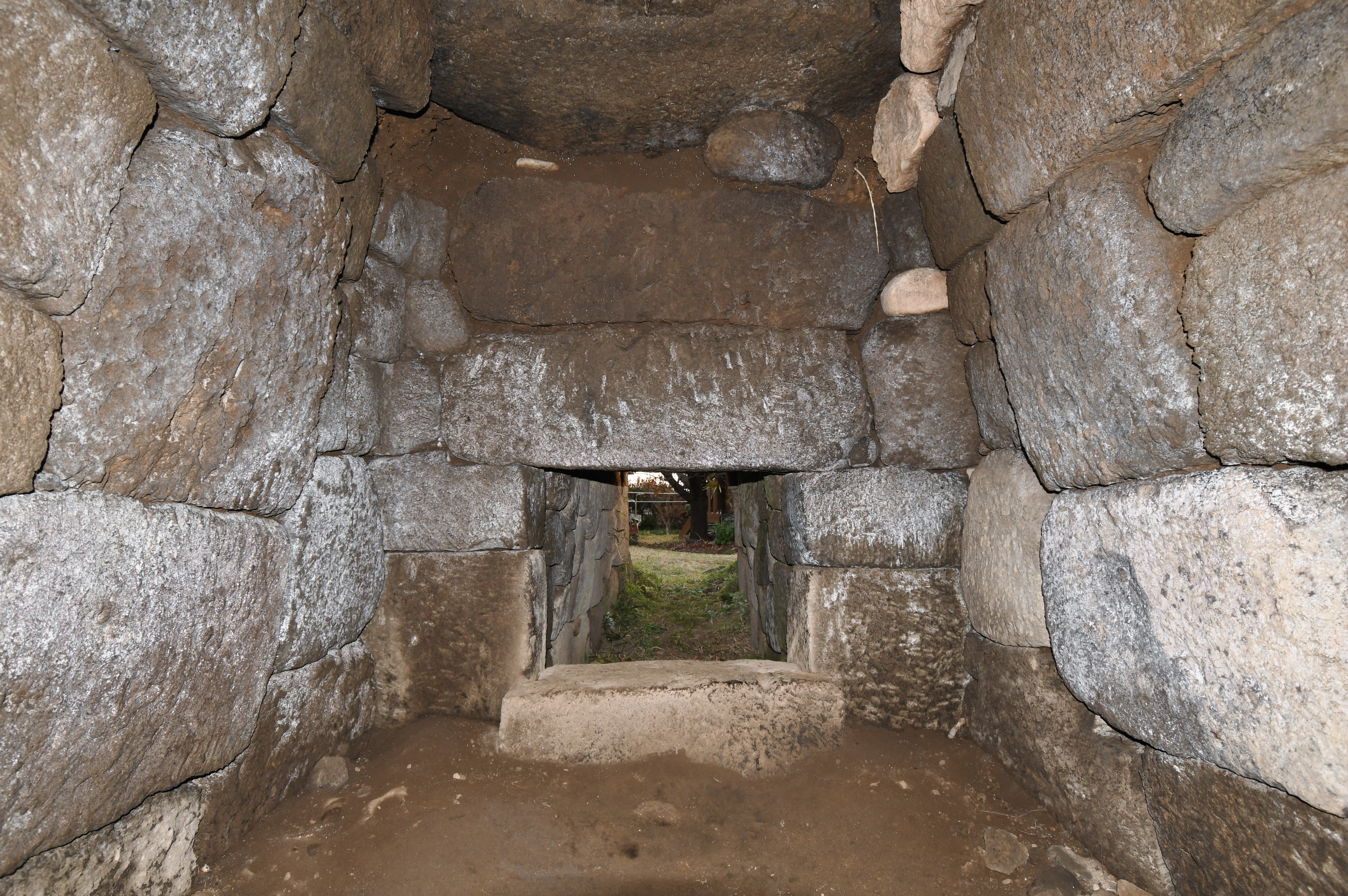
Burial Chamber (towards the opening)

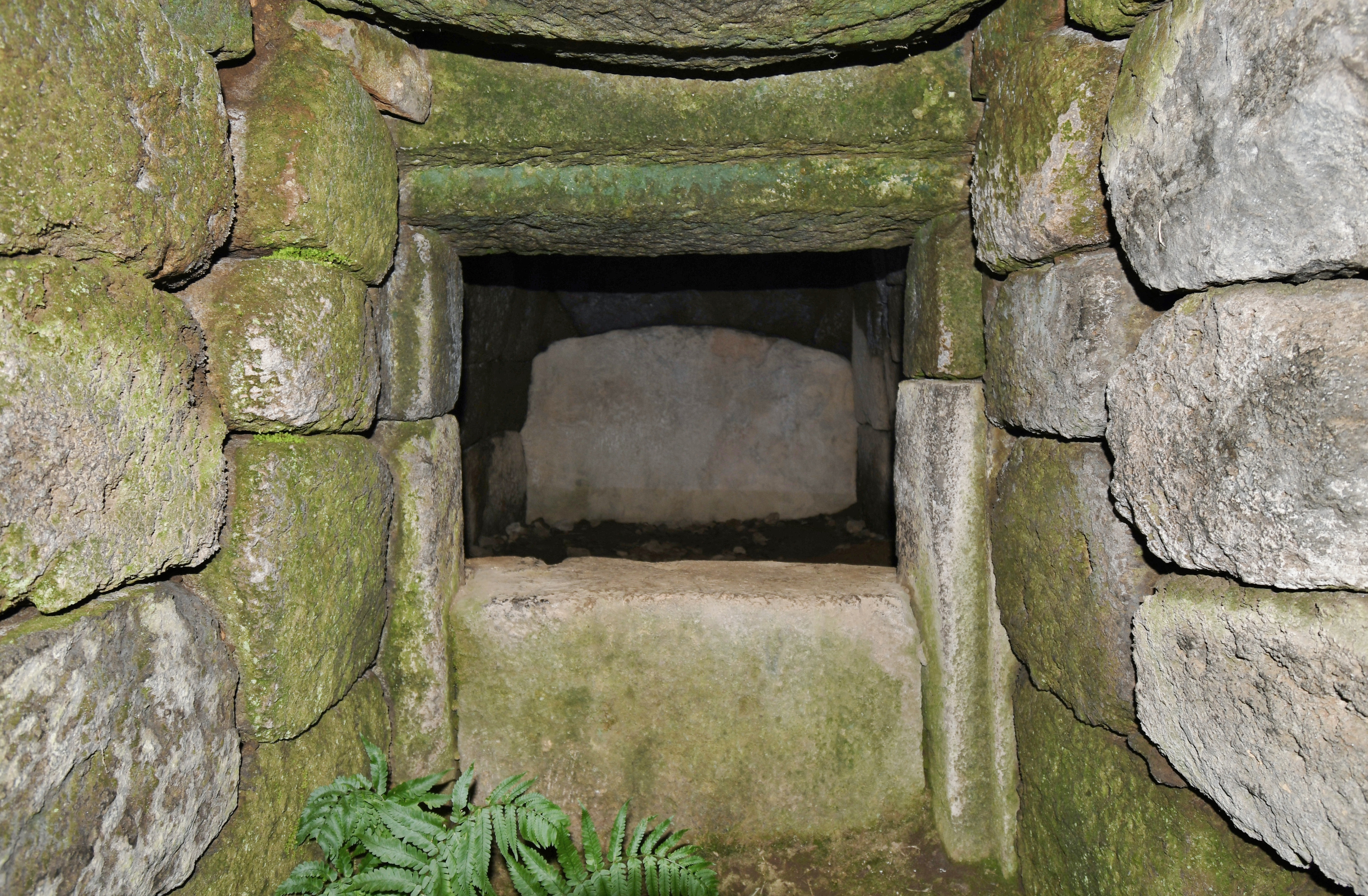
Entrance Gate (towards the burial chamber)

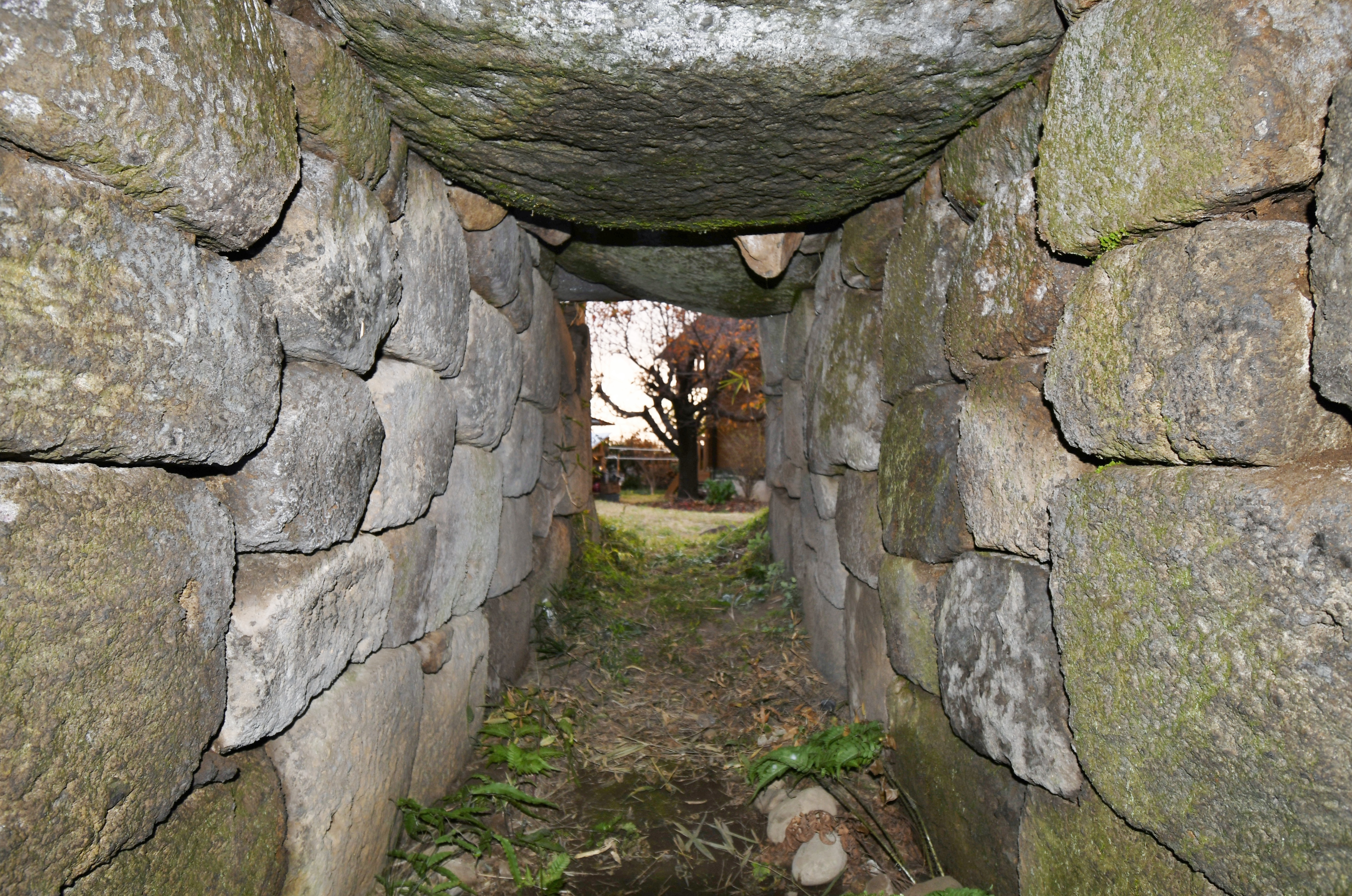
Entrance Passage (towards the opening)

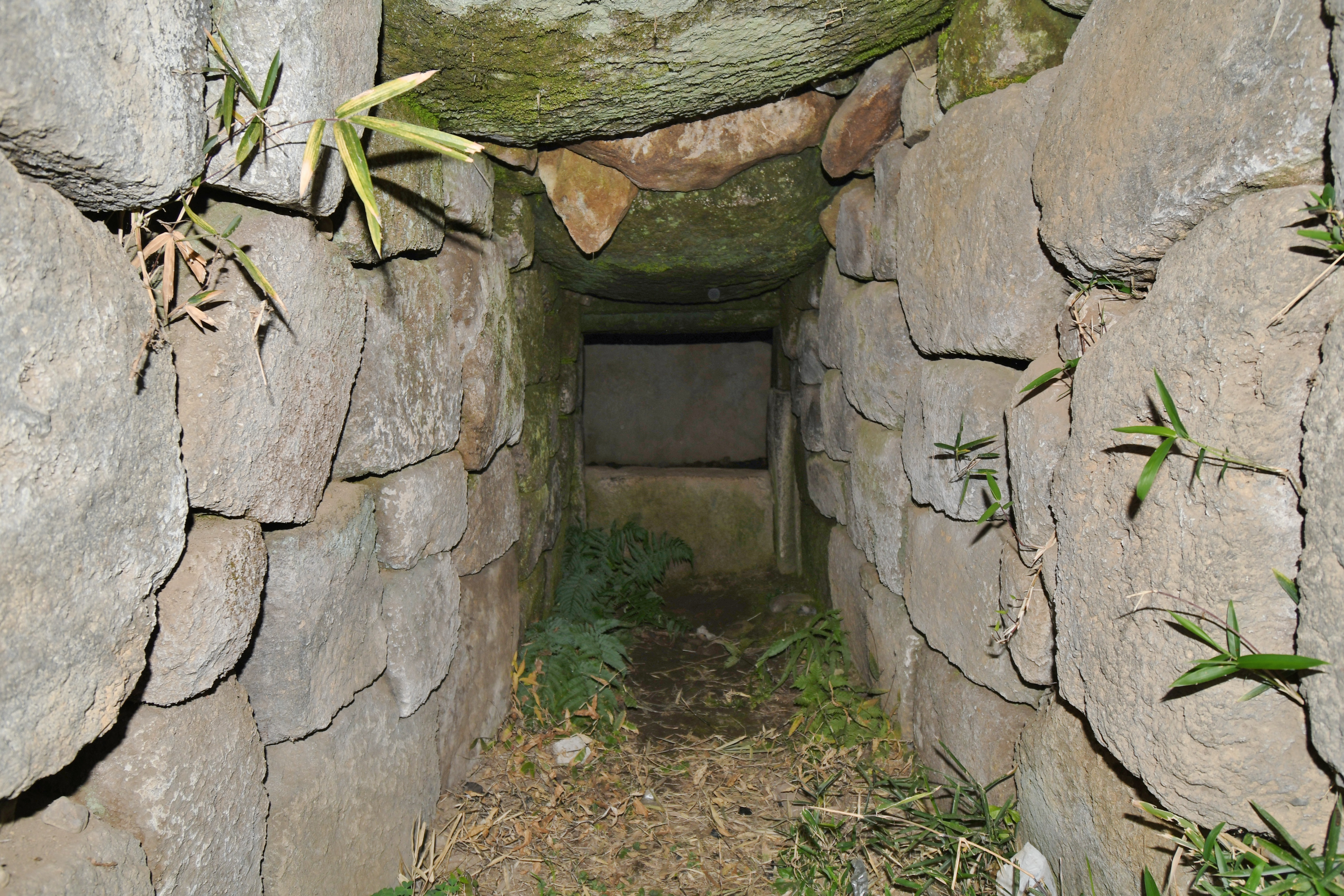
Entrance Passage (towards the burial chamber)

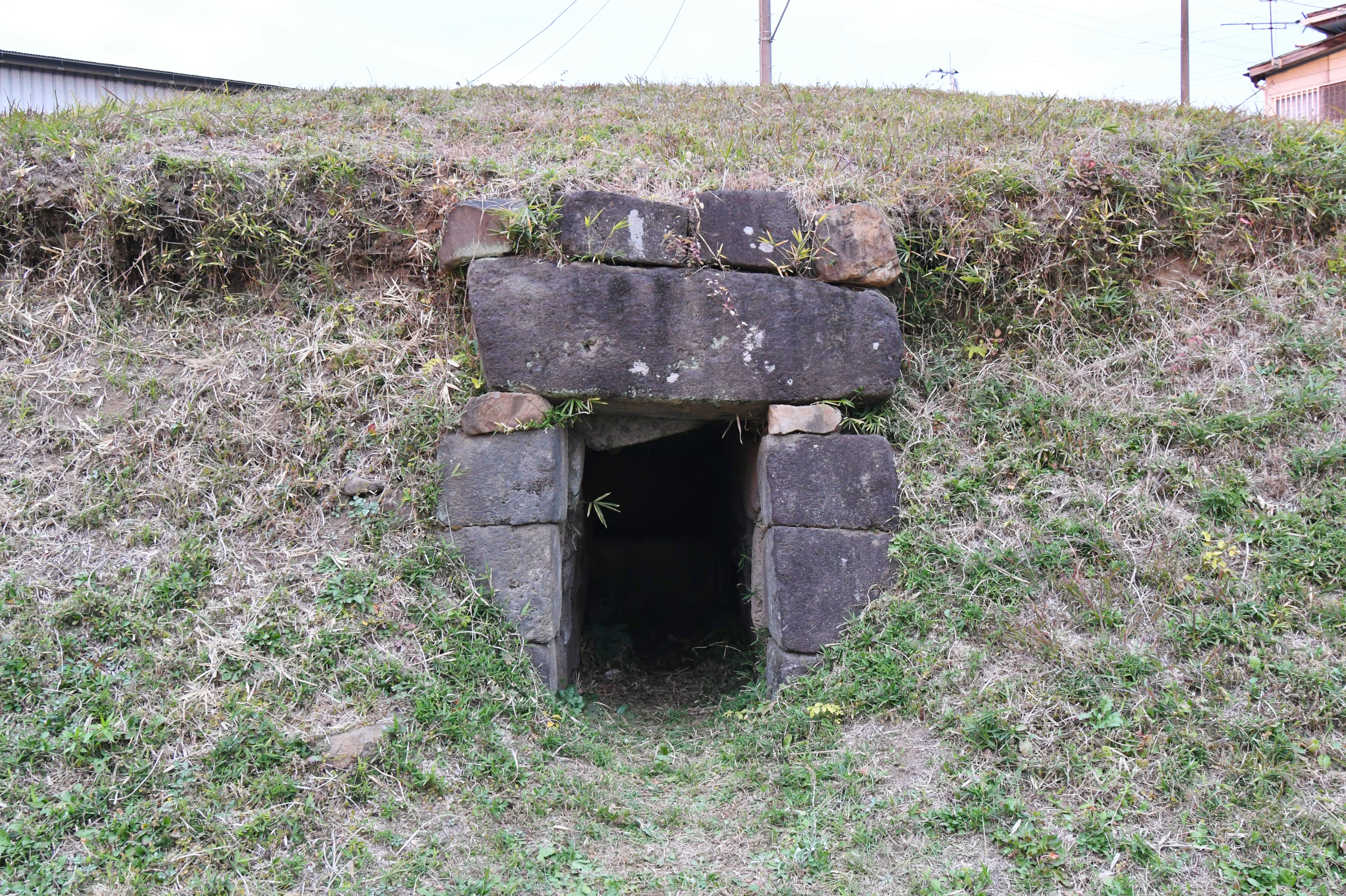
Entrance

== See also ==
- List of Historic Sites of Japan (Gunma)
