= Tago Stele =

Stone memorial in Japan

- 多胡碑 (Japanese)
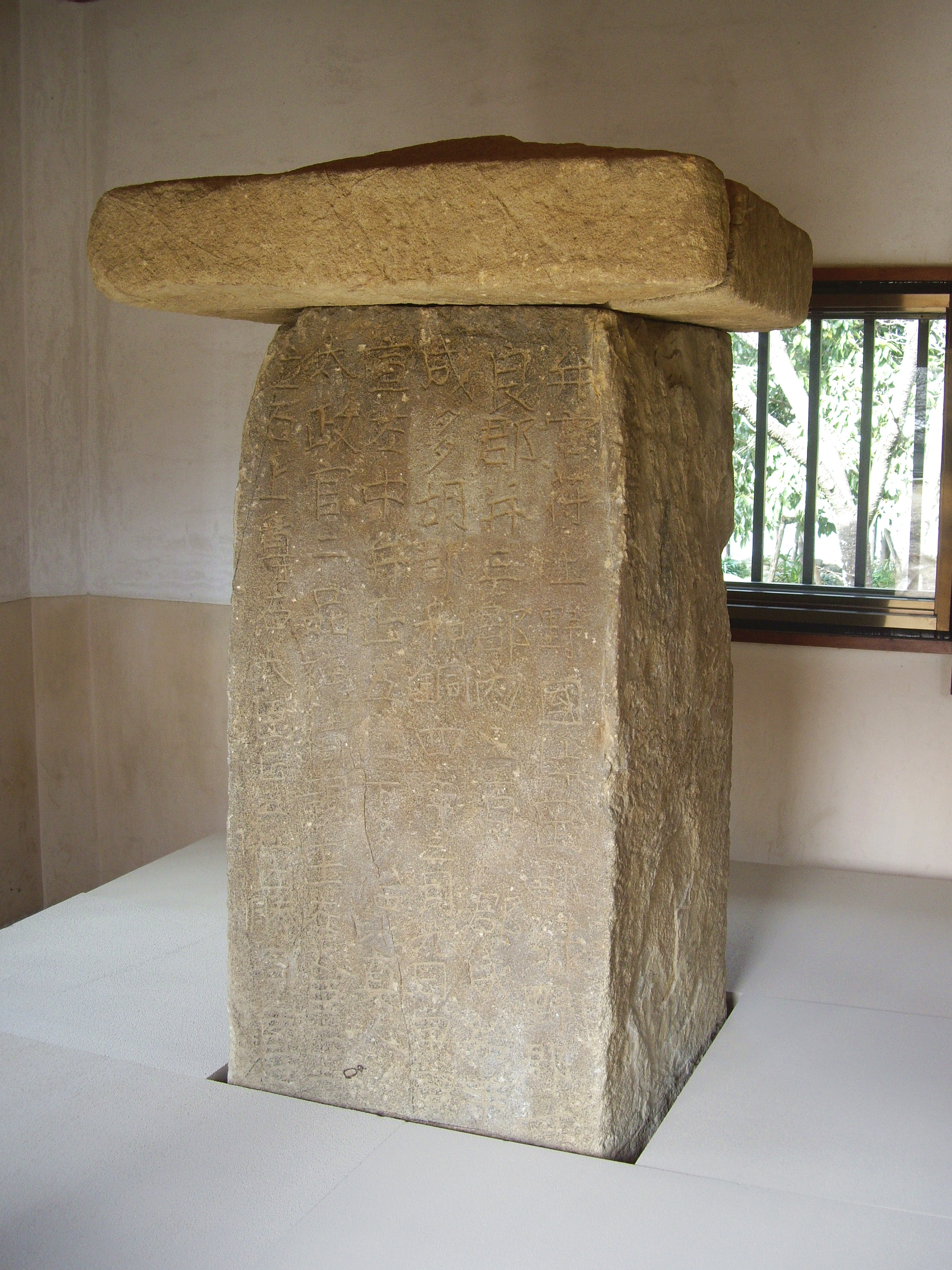
- Tago stele

- Tago Stele Tago Stele (Japan)
- 36°15′53″N 138°59′47″E
- Type: stele
- Periods: Nara period
- Location: Takasaki, Gunma, Japan
- Region: Kantō region

History
- Built: 711 AD

Site notes
- Material: sandstone
- Length: 1.29 m (4 ft 3 in)
- Width: 0.69 m (2 ft 3 in)
- Public access: Yes

The Tago Stele (多胡碑, Tago hi) is a Nara period stele discovered in the city of Takasaki, Gunma Prefecture, in the northern Kantō region of Japan. The stele was designated a National Historic Site of Japan in 1921, and was raised in status to that of a Special National Historic Site in 1954. As one of the "Three Stelae of Kōzuke", it was submitted by Japan for inclusion into the UNESCO Memory of the World Programme in 2017.

== Overview ==
The practice of erecting stelae was introduced to Japan from the Korean Peninsula and Tang China around the seventh century AD; however, the practice of erecting stelae never became as widespread as in China and Korea, partly due to the fact that in this period of Japanese history, writing was the preserve of the elite. There are only eighteen stelae known to exist from the seventh to eleventh centuries in Japan, of which three are located a small, three-kilometer, area of southwestern Gunma Prefecture. From the fifth century AD, this region welcomed immigrants from the mainland, who brought advanced technologies, such as raising and breeding horses, iron working, stoneware production, and weaving. It is likely that the local inhabitants regarded their region as sophisticated in comparison with surrounding provinces despite its distance from the capital at Asuka or Nara.

The Tago Stele is a three-part stone monument with a foundation, stele, and capstone, all made of locally quarried sandstone with a hardness similar to concrete. It has an overall height of 1.29 meters, width of 69 centimeters and thickness of 62 centimeters. The stele is inscribed with a text of 80 kanji in six vertical rows. The foundation stone was also inscribed, but since it was stabilised in concrete, this inscription can no longer be read. The inscription on the main stele appears to be a proclamation announcing the division of three hundred households from Kataoka, Midorino, and Kara counties in Kōzuke Province to create a new county, Tago-gun, to rule over the numerous local "Hu peoples". The date of March 9, 4th year of Wado (April 1, 711) is also given. The meaning of the kanji「 羊 」 in the inscription is subject to considerable scholarly debate, but consensus is that it refers to immigrants from the Korean peninsula who settled in this region. A Koma Jinja (高麗 神社) in the vicinity also hints at ancient Korean immigration, and the style of the monuments itself has similarities with stele which have been discovered in the Korean kingdom of Silla. In an entry in the Shoku Nihongi dated 766 AD, 193 immigrants from Silla living in the area were granted the Japanese family name of "Yoshii".

Excavations nearby in 2016 revealed the remains of a warehouse complex for storing tax rice, indicating that this was the location of a Kanga, or county-level administration center as stipulated under the Ritsuryō system of the early 8th century, possibly that of the "Tago County" mentioned on the stele. The inscription also gives the names of three people who can be identified from historical sources: Prince Hozumi (the son of Emperor Tenmu), Isonokami no Maro and Fujiwara no Fuhito. This also corresponds exactly to an entry on the establishment of Tago County on the third month of the fourth year of Wado in the Shoku Nihongi official chronicle compiled in 797 AD.

The monument disappeared from history for 700 years, and was rediscovered in 1509. As the inscription was very well preserved, it can be assumed that it was buried with the inscription side face-down for centuries. During the Edo period, the stele became well known as a reference for use in Japanese calligraphy.

In 1875, the governor of Gunma Prefecture, Katori Motohiko, authorized the prefectural government to purchase a land where the stele is located, and had a small structure built to protect it. The current municipal Tago Museum was established in 1996, where the stele is now kept behind a glass front and can be viewed by the public. It is located a 20-minute walk from Yoshii Station on the Jōshin Dentetsu railway.

== See also ==
- List of Historic Sites of Japan (Gunma)
- Kanaizawa Stele
- Yamanoue Stele
