= Three Stelae of Kōzuke =

Stone monuments in Japan

The Three Stelae of Kōzuke (上野三碑) are three ancient stelae (graven stone monuments) in the former Kōzuke Province of Japan, located in what is now the city of Takasaki, Gunma Prefecture, in the Kantō region. Together, they were inscribed in the UNESCO Memory of the World Register as "Three Cherished Stelae of Ancient Kozuke" in 2017.

These are the oldest of the 18 known extant Japanese stelae. The Yamanoue Stele is from 681 AD (Asuka period), the Tago Stele from 711 AD (Nara period), and the Kanaizawa Stele from 726 AD (Nara period). The Yamanoue Stele is the oldest surviving example of Chinese characters using Japanese grammar.

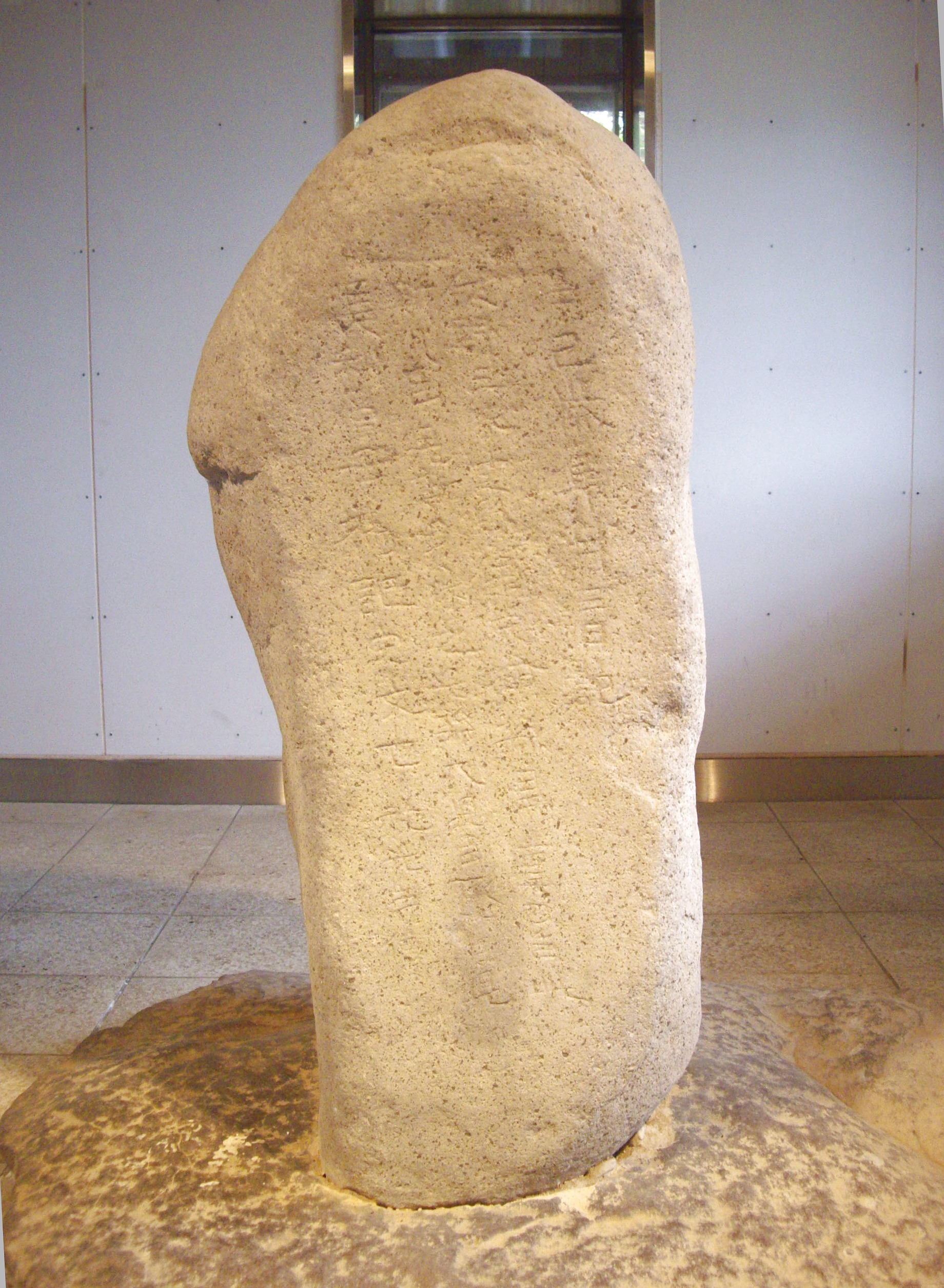
Yamanoue Stele

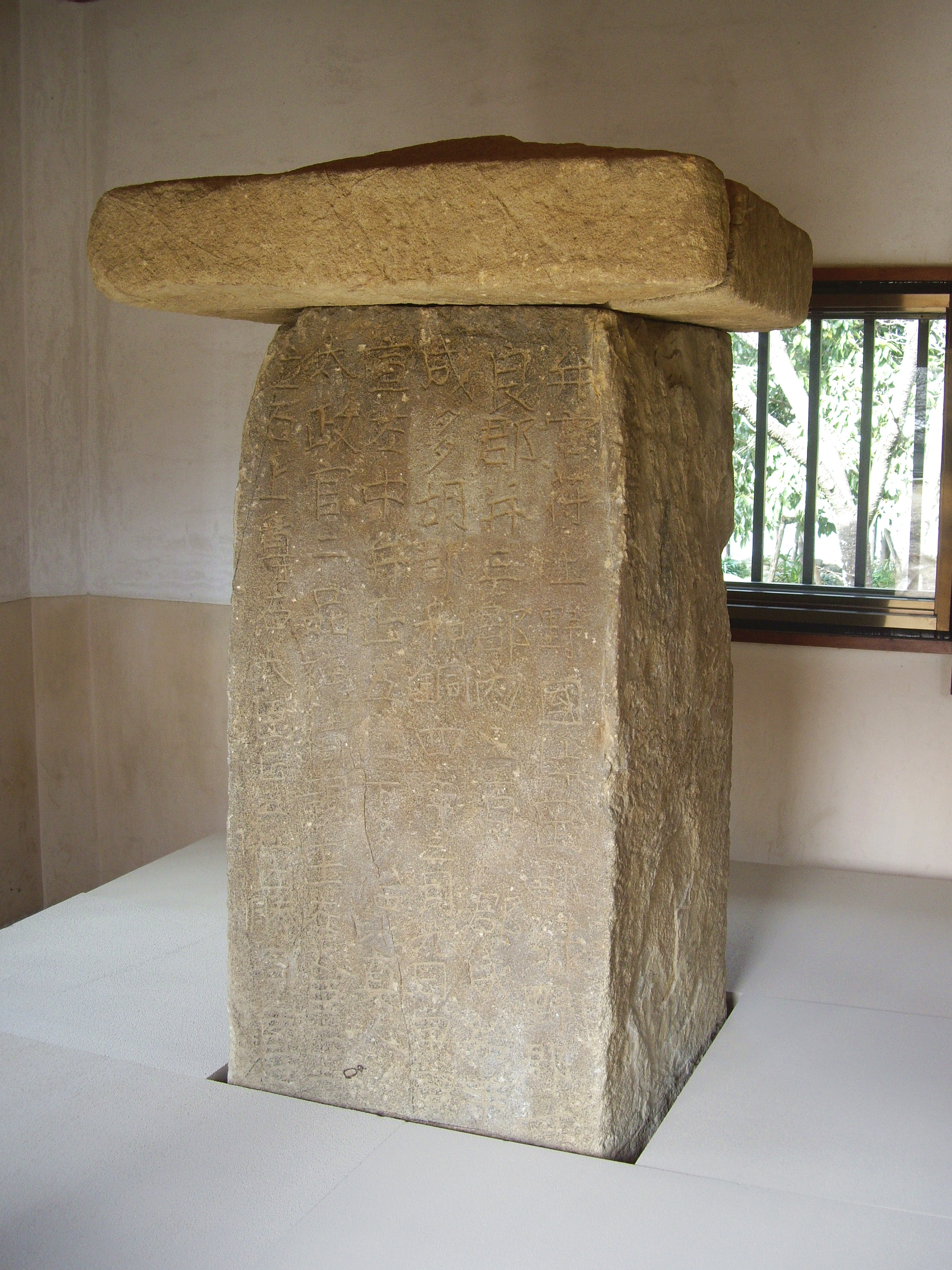
Tago Stele

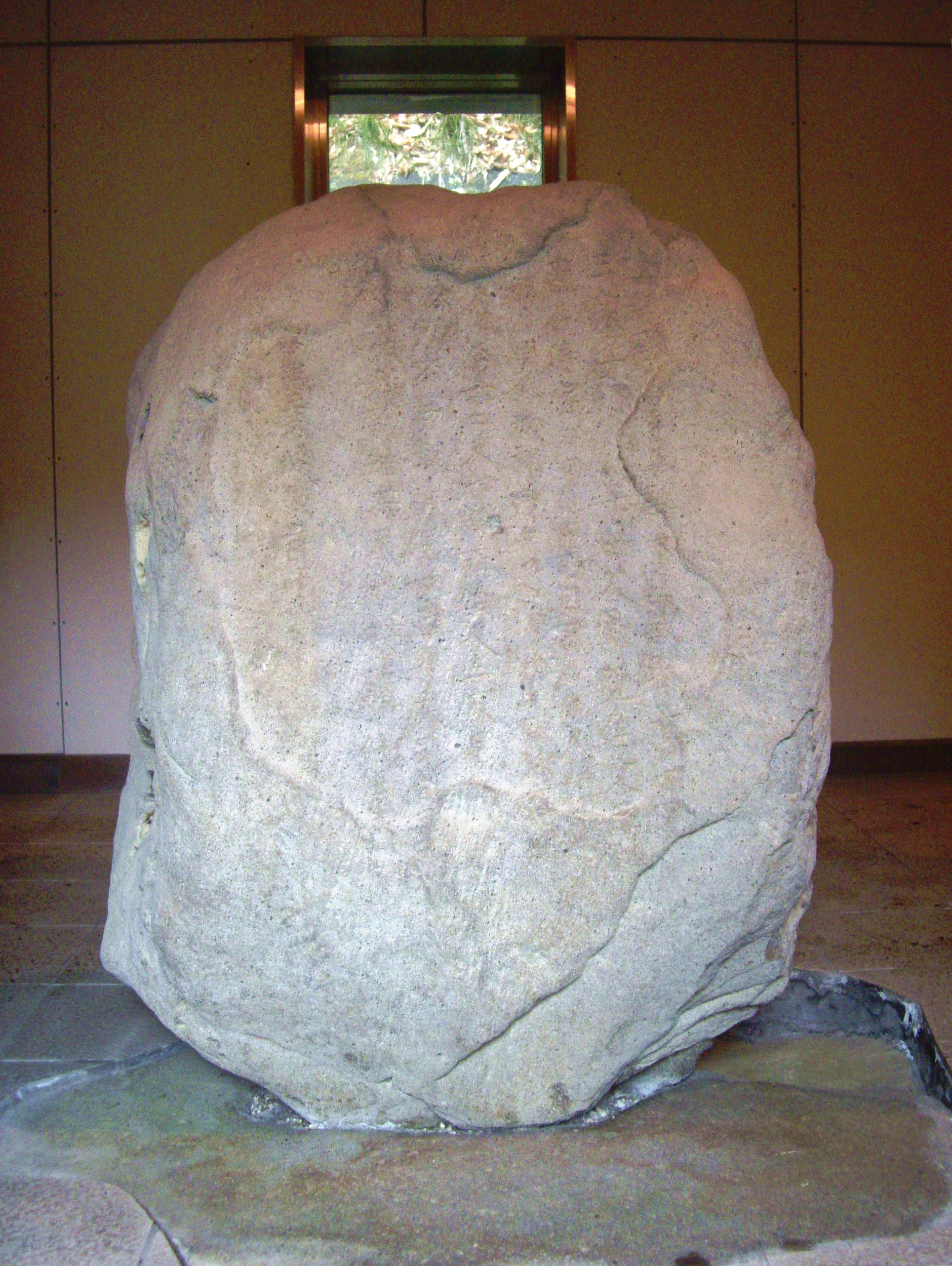
Kanaizawa Stele
