= Kanaizawa Stele =

- 金井沢碑 (Japanese)
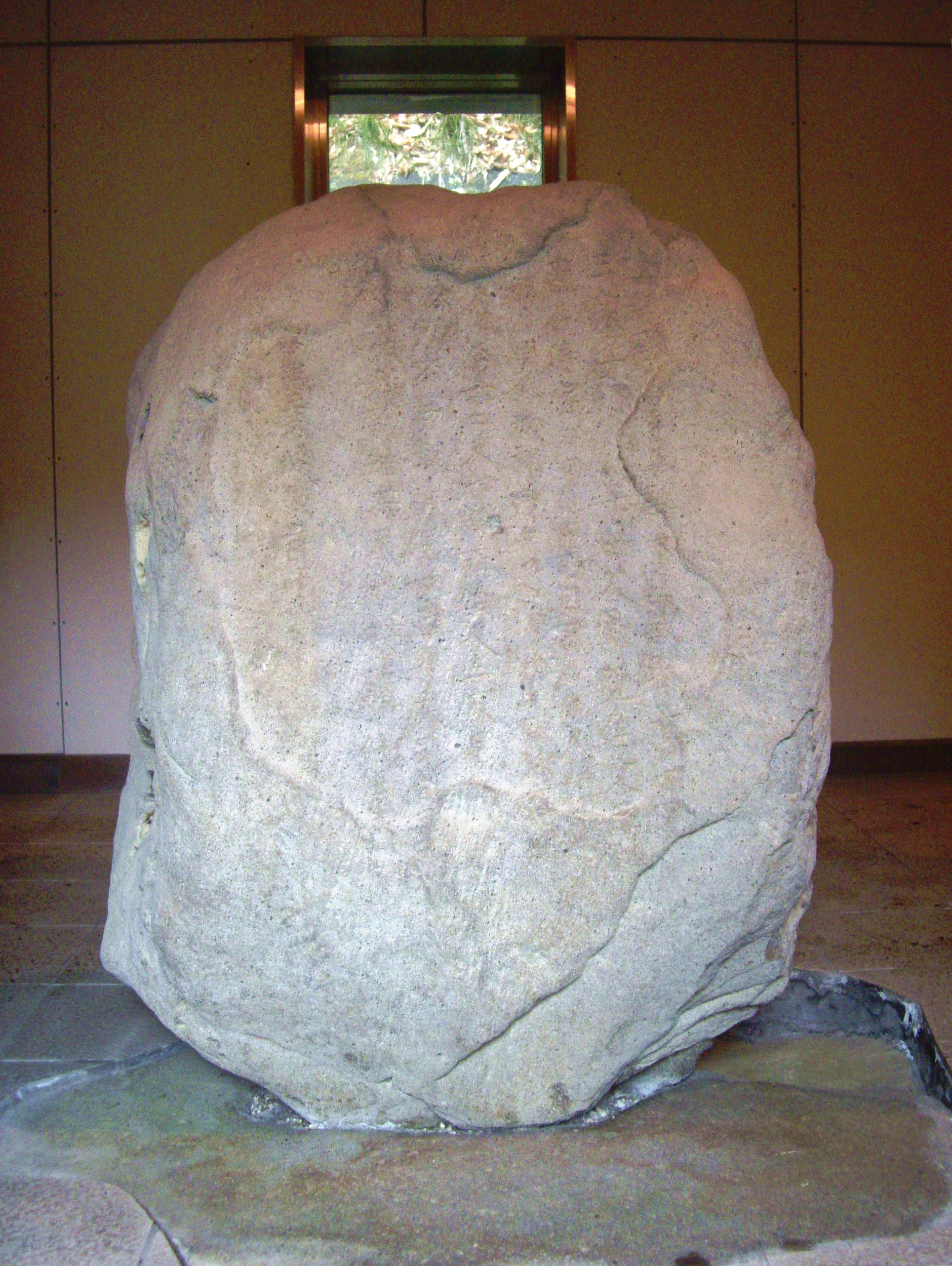
- Kanaizawa stele

- Kanaizawa Stele Kanaizawa Stele (Japan)
- 36°17′08″N 139°00′58″E
- Type: stele
- Periods: Nara period
- Location: Takasaki, Gunma, Japan
- Region: Kantō region

History
- Built: 726 AD

Site notes
- Material: andesite
- Height: 110 cm (43 in)
- Width: 70 cm (28 in)
- Public access: Yes

The Kanaizawa Stele (金井沢碑, Kanaizawa hi) is a Nara period stele discovered in the Yamana neighborhood of the city of Takasaki, Gunma Prefecture, in the northern Kantō region of Japan. The stele was designated a National Historic Site of Japan in 1921, and was raised in status to a Special National Historic Site in 1954. As one of the "Three Stelae of Kōzuke", it was submitted by Japan for inclusion into the UNESCO Memory of the World Programme in 2017

== Overview ==
The practice of erecting stelae was introduced to Japan from the Korean Peninsula and Tang China around the seventh century AD; however, the practice of erecting stelae never became as widespread as in China and Korea, partly due to the fact that in this period of Japanese history, writing was the preserve of the elite. There are only eighteen stelae known to exist from the seventh to eleventh centuries in Japan, of which three are located a small, three-kilometer, area of southwestern Gunma Prefecture. From the fifth century AD, this region welcomed immigrants from the mainland, who brought advanced technologies, such as raising and breeding horses, iron working, stoneware production, and weaving. It is likely that the local inhabitants regarded their region as sophisticated in comparison with surrounding provinces despite its distance from the capital at Asuka or Nara.

The Kanaizawa Stele was found lying flat on the southern slope of a hill facing the hamlet of Kanaizawa and was excavated in the middle of the Edo period by farmers who used it as a washboard for vegetables in a nearby stream. It is made of andesite and has a height of 110 cm, a width of 70 cm and a thickness of 65 cm. The surface has an inscription in nine lines with 112 kanji with the date of 726 AD. It is a memorial for seven generations of ancestors an aristocratic family in Takada Village, Shimosanu Ward, Gunma County, Kōzuke Province named "Miyake". A total of nine family members are named, including four women. The head of the family was Sano no Miyake (佐野 三家), who is believed to be a descendant of the family that erected the nearby Yamanoue Stele. This inscription is a pledge by members of the Miyake family of their devotion to Buddhism. The place name given in the inscription corresponds to a local administrative unit which existed from 711 to 740 AD as stipulated by the ritsuryō system. Likewise, the format in which the names were written is in the family-register format stipulated by the ritsuryō system. The stele therefore provides confirmation of the enforcement of the hometown system and the penetration of Buddhism into the northern Kantō region by the early Nara period. The inscription of "Gunma" on this stele is the earliest known reference to this topographic name.

This stela is listed in an inventory compiled by Matsudaira Sadanobu in the 1790s. In 1884, the governor of Gunma Prefecture, Katori Motohiko, authorized the prefectural government to purchase a land where the stele is located, put the monument on a new base stone, and had a small structure built to protect it. The current structure dates from 1991 and the stele can be viewed through a window It is located about 10 minutes on foot from Negoya Station on the Jōshin Dentetsu railway.

== See also ==
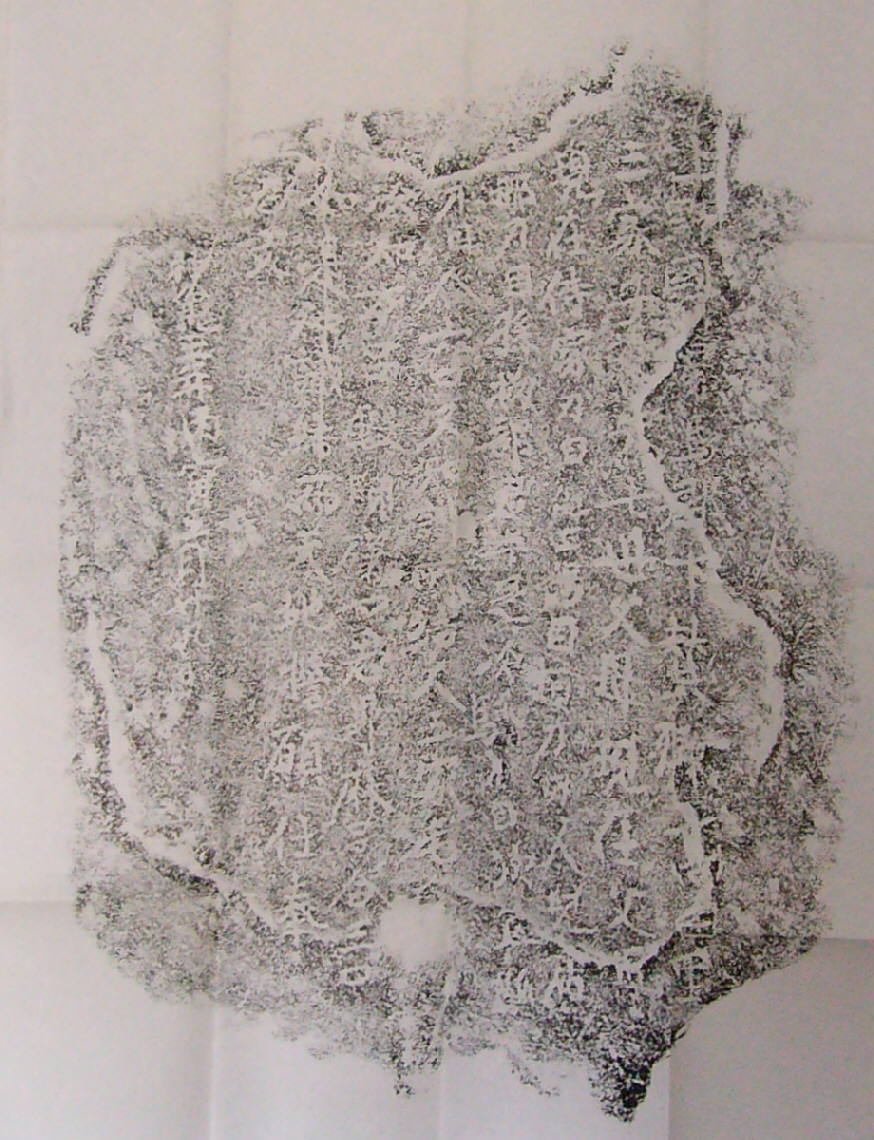
Rubbing of the Kanaizawa Stele

- List of Historic Sites of Japan (Gunma)
- Yamanoue Stele
- Tago Stele
