= Yamanoue Stele =

- 山ノ上碑 (Japanese)
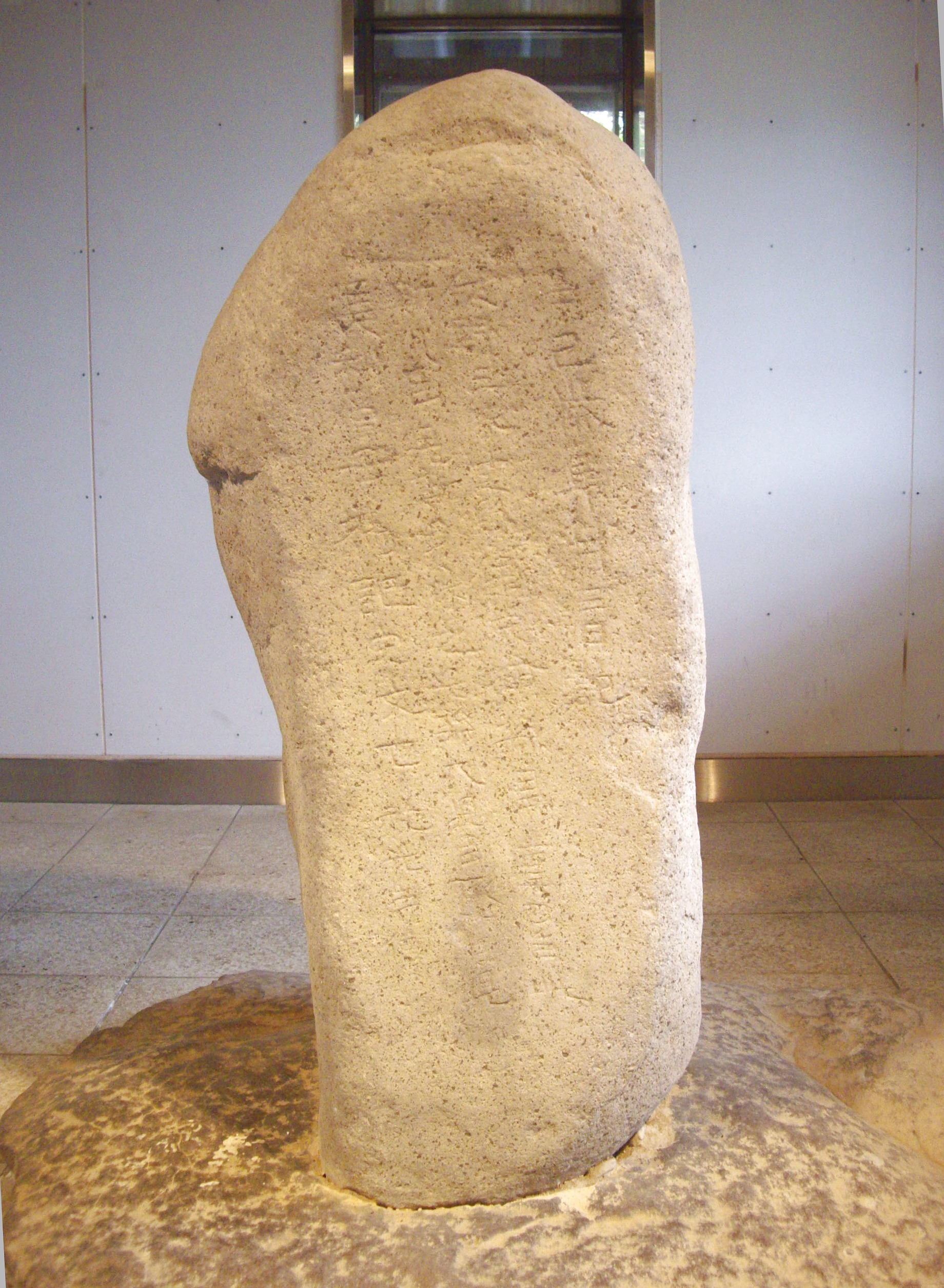
- Yamanoue stele

- Yamanoue Stele Yamanoue Stele (Japan)
- 36°16′38″N 139°01′40″E
- Type: stele, kofun
- Periods: Asuka period
- Location: Takasaki, Gunma, Japan
- Region: Kantō region

History
- Built: 681AD

Site notes
- Material: andesite
- Height: 1.1 m (3 ft 7 in)
- Public access: Yes

Yamanoue Stele (山ノ上碑, Yamanoue hi) (also written 山上碑) is an Asuka period stele discovered in the Yamana neighborhood of the city of Takasaki, Gunma Prefecture, in the northern Kantō region of Japan. The stele was designated a National Historic Site of Japan in 1921, and was raised in status to that of a Special National Historic Site in 1954. It is associated with the adjacent Yamanoue Kofun (山ノ上古墳), a kofun burial mound, which is also covered under the Special Historical Site designation. As one of the "Three Stelae of Kōzuke", the Yamanoue Stele was submitted by Japan for inclusion into the UNESCO Memory of the World Programme in 2017 The inscription on the Yamanoue Stele is the oldest example of writing in Chinese characters according to Japanese grammar.

== The Yamanoue Stele ==
The practice of erecting stelae was introduced to Japan from the Korean Peninsula and Tang China around the seventh century AD; however, the practice of erecting stelae never became as widespread as in China and Korea, partly due to the fact that in this period of Japanese history, writing was the preserve of the elite. There are only eighteen stelae known to exist from the seventh to eleventh centuries in Japan, of which three are located a small, three-kilometer, area of southwestern Gunma Prefecture. From the fifth century AD, this region welcomed immigrants from the mainland, who brought advanced technologies, such as raising and breeding horses, iron working, stoneware production, and weaving. It is likely that the local inhabitants regarded their region as sophisticated in comparison with surrounding provinces despite its distance from the capital at Asuka or Nara.

The Yamanoue stele is a natural stone, only slightly worked, reminiscent of similar contemporary stone monuments which have been found in the Korean kingdom of Silla. The presence of immigrants from Silla in this area and during this time is attested to in the Shoku Nihongi official chronicles. The monument is made of andesite with a height of 1.11 meters, width of 47 to 50 centimeters and a thickness of approximately. 50 centimeters. The inscription is engraved in clerical script and consists of 53 kanji arranged in four vertical rows. It is believed to be an epitaph for the neighboring kofun. From the text it appears that this stele was commissioned by a Buddhist monk named Nagatoshi-no-hoshi from the temple of Hōkō-ji. This monk was a descendant of the local aristocrat who managed the Sano imperial estate, and may be related to the Miyake family mentioned in the nearby Kanaizawa Stele. The monument was erected in honor of his late mother Kurome-tōji. The inscription gives the names of his ancestors on his mother's and father's side, and the date of 681 AD. While the inscription is written in Chinese characters (kanji), the text is according to Japanese grammar, and is thus one of the earliest known examples of the adoption of kanji for use in written Japanese.

辛巳歳集月三日記
佐野三家定賜健守命孫黒賣刀自此
新川臣兒斯多々彌足尼孫大兒臣娶生兒
長利僧母爲記定文也 放光寺僧

This stela is listed as being housed in a temple Kannon Bosatsu by in an inventory compiled by Matsudaira Sadanobu in the 1790s. In 1884, the governor of Gunma Prefecture, Katori Motohiko, authorized the prefectural government to purchase a land where the stele is located, put the monument on a new base stone, and had a small structure built to protect it. The current structure dates from 1992, and the stele can be viewed by the public through a window. It is a 20-minute walk from Nishi-Yamana Station or Yamana Station on the Jōshin Dentetsu railway.

== Family tree ==
Tatami-no-sukune 多々彌足尼
Niikawa-no-omi 新川臣
Ōgo-no-omi 大兒臣

Takemori-no-mikoto 健守命
unknown
Kurome-no-toji 黒賣刀自
Chōri-no-hōshi 長利僧

== The Yamanoue Kofun ==
Yamanoue Kofun

The Yamanoue Kofun is a typical late Kofun period domed tumulus, located about 15 meters on the east side of the Yamanoue Stele. It has a diameter of 15 meters. Neither haniwa nor fukiishi have been found at the site. The tomb has an opening to the south, with a total length of 7.4 meters, with a burial chamber measuring 2.68 by 1.75 meters with a 1.66 meter height. The tomb has been open since antiquity and no grave goods have been found. It is possibly from the same date, or slightly later than the stele, and from the inscription on the Yamanoue Stele, it is assumed that it was the tomb of Kurome-tōji.

In addition, there is another kofun located 200 meters to the west of this tumulus, of the same scale and approximate age. Called the Yamanokami Nishi Tumulus, this kofun has collapsed and is mostly buried, and is not part of the historic site designation.

== See also ==
- List of Historic Sites of Japan (Gunma)
- Kanaizawa Stele
- Tago Stele
